= List of music museums =

This list of music museums offers a guide to museums worldwide that specialize in the domain of music. These institutions are dedicated to the preservation and exhibition of music-related history, including the lives and works of prominent musicians, the evolution and variety of musical instruments, and other aspects of the world of music. The list includes both existing and historical museums. This list is not exhaustive.

== Argentina ==
- Academia Nacional del Tango de la República Argentina – Buenos Aires
- Museo Beatle, dedicated to The Beatles – Buenos Aires
- Museo de instrumentos musicales Emilio Azzarini – La Plata
- Museo de las Campanas (2001–2013†) – Mina Clavero

== Armenia ==
- House-Museum of Aram Khachaturian, dedicated to Aram Khachaturian – Yerevan
- Charles Aznavour Museum, dedicated to Charles Aznavour – Yerevan

== Australia ==
- National Film and Sound Archive – Acton, Australian Capital Territory
- Tandanya National Aboriginal Cultural Institute – Adelaide, South Australia
- National Library of Australia – Canberra, Australian Capital Territory
- Australian Country Music Hall of Fame – Tamworth, New South Wales
- Slim Dusty Centre – Kempsey, New South Wales
- Grainger Museum, dedicated to Percy Grainger – University of Melbourne, Victoria
- Australian Performing Arts Collection – Melbourne
- Arts Centre Melbourne, musical collection – Melbourne
- ARIA Hall of Fame – Melbourne
- Australian Jazz Museum – Wantirna, Victoria

== Austria ==
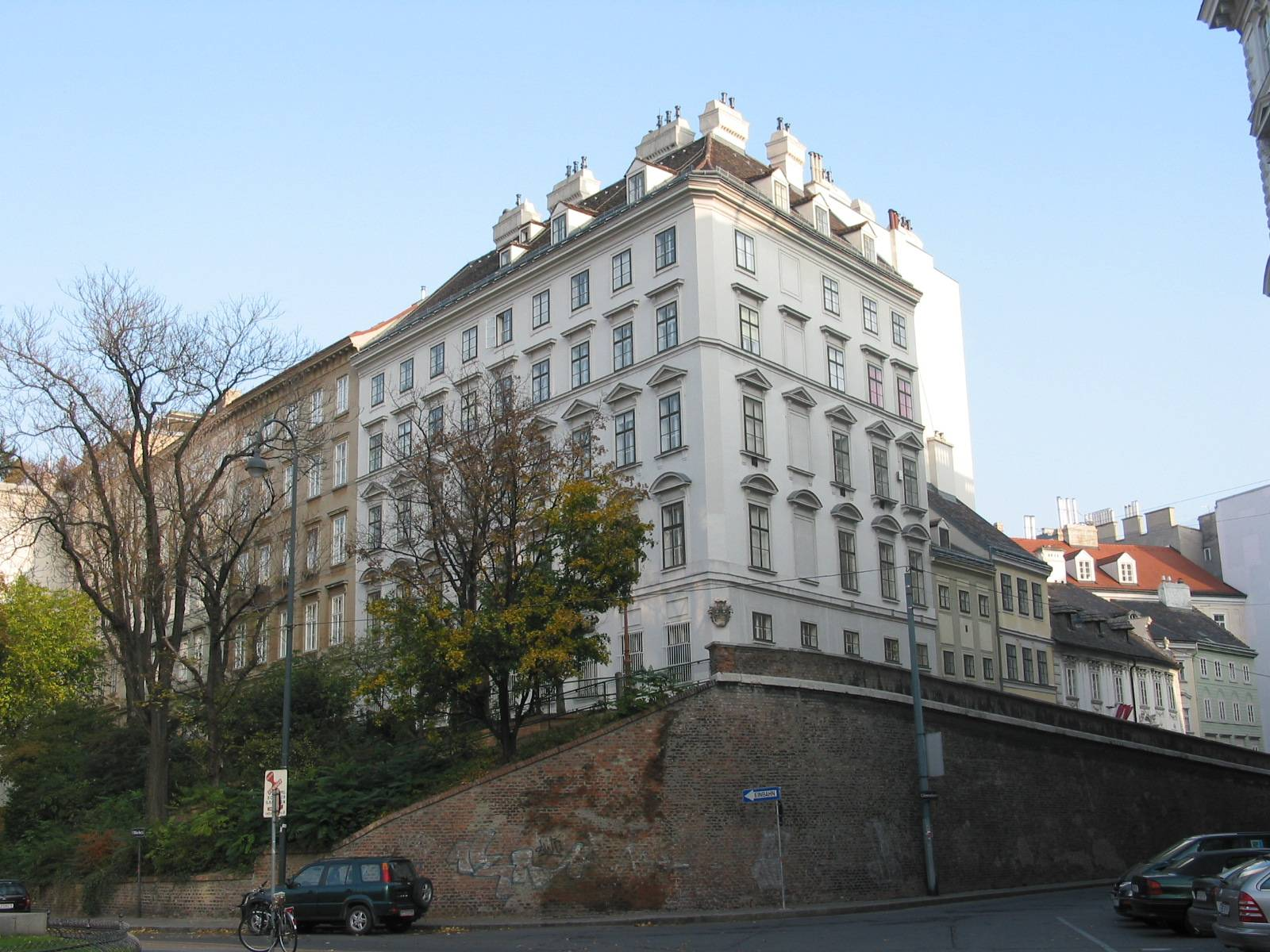
Pasqualati-Haus

Dedicated to composers

dedicated to Ludwig van Beethoven

- Beethoven-Haus – Krems an der Donau
- Beethoven-Haus Baden – Baden bei Wien, Vienna
- Erdődy estate (1976–2013†) – Floridsdorf, Vienna
- Bezirksmuseum Floridsdorf, musical collection – Floridsdorf
- Eroica-Haus – Vienna
- Haus des Heiligenstädter Testaments – Vienna
- Pasqualati House – Vienna
- Beethoven-Haus Probusgasse – Vienna

dedicated to Johannes Brahms or Joseph Haydn

- Brahms Museum, Mürzzuschlag – Mürzzuschlag
- Haydn-Haus Vienna with Brahms room – Vienna
- Haydn-Haus Eisenstadt – Eisenstadt
- Haydnkirche – Eisenstadt
- Haydn's birthplace, dedicated to Joseph and Michael Haydn – Rohrau

dedicated to Anton Bruckner

- Anton Bruckner Museum – Ansfelden
- Kronstorfer Brucknerzimmer – Kronstorf

dedicated to Gustav Mahler

- Composing hut of Gustav Mahler – Steinbach am Attersee
- Composing hut of Gustav Mahler – Maiernigg near Maria Wörth

dedicated to Wolfgang Amadeus Mozart or family members

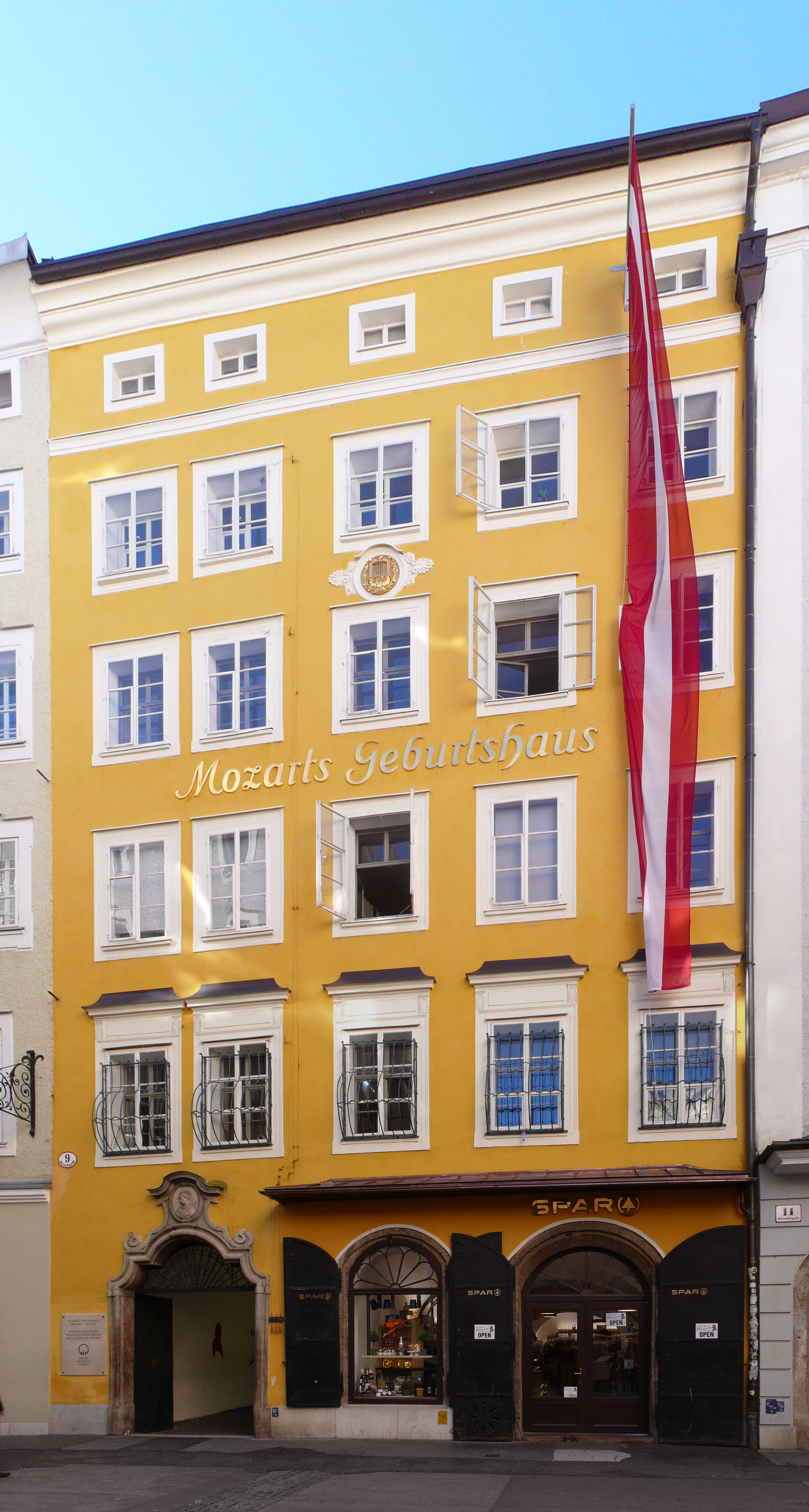
Mozart's birthplace, Salzburg

- Mozarthaus, dedicated to Nannerl Mozart and her mother – St. Gilgen
- Mozart's birthplace – Salzburg
- Mozarts Wohnhaus, dedicated to the whole family – Salzburg
- Mozarthaus – Vienna

dedicated to Arnold Schoenberg

- Schönberg-Haus – Mödling
- Arnold Schönberg Center – Vienna

dedicated to Franz Schubert

- Schloss Atzenbrugg – Atzenbrugg
- Schubert's birthplace – Vienna
- Death house of Franz Schubert – Vienna

dedicated to the Strauss family

- House of Strauss, dedicated to the Strauss family – Vienna
- Museum der Johann Strauss Dynastie, (2015–2020†) dedicated to the Strauss family – Vienna
- Johann Strauss Wohnung, dedicated to Johann Strauss II – Vienna

dedicated to other composers

- Zeitbrücke-Museum, partly dedicated to Franz von Suppé – Gars am Kamp
- Lehár Villa, dedicated to Franz Lehár – Bad Ischl
- Carl Zeller-Museum, dedicated to Carl Zeller – St. Peter in der Au
- Liszthaus, dedicated to Franz Liszt – Raiding
- Pleyel Museum, dedicated to Ignaz Pleyel – Ruppersthal, near Großweikersdorf

Vienna (other museums)

- Fatty-George-Jazzmus, dedicated to Fatty George
- Haus der Musik
- Kunsthistorisches Museum, musical collection
- Vienna Technical Museum, musical collection

Other museums

- Eboardmuseum – Klagenfurt
- Musikinstrumentenmuseum Schloss Kremsegg – Kremsmünster
- Stille-Nacht & Heimatmuseum, partly dedicated to Silent Night – Oberndorf bei Salzburg
- Blasmusikmuseum – Ratten

== Azerbaijan ==
- Azerbaijan State Museum of Musical Culture – Baku

== Belarus ==
- Czesław Niemen Museum, dedicated to Czesław Niemen – Staryya Vasilishki

== Belgium ==
East and West Flanders

- Jazz Center Flanders, with jazz museum – Dendermonde
- Peter Benoit Huis, dedicated to Peter Benoit – Harelbeke
- Organ collection Ghysels – Kallo, Beveren
- Music Museum De Harmonie – Koekelare
- Jukebox Museum Menen (2012–2017†) – Menen

Province of Antwerp

- Museum Vleeshuis – Antwerp
- Harmonium Art museuM (?–2023†) – Klein-Willebroek
- Royal Carillon School "Jef Denyn", dedicated to Jef Denyn – Mechelen
- Barrel Organ Museum Voortkapel – Voortkapel, Westerlo

Brussels and Flemish Brabant

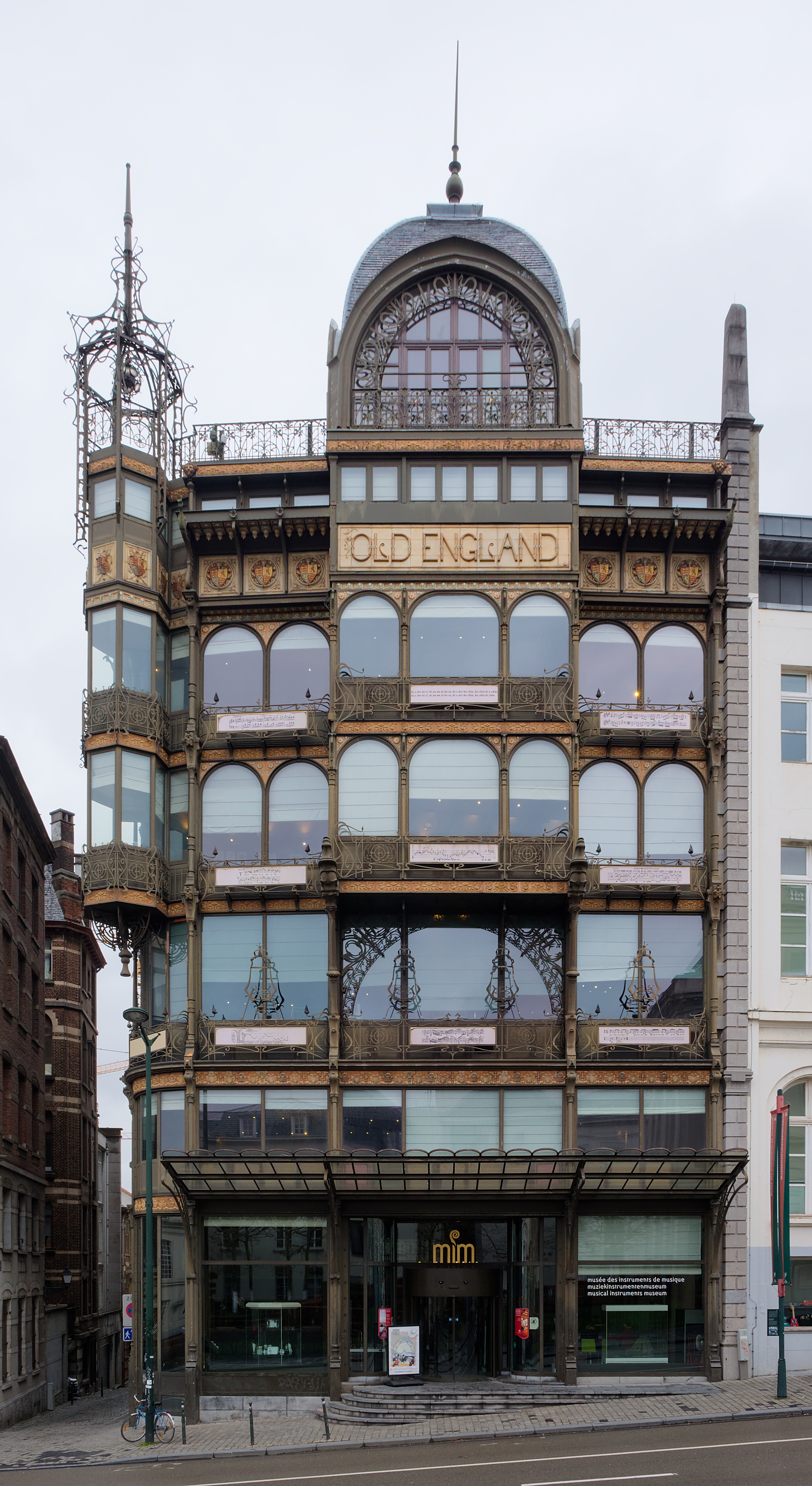
Musical Instrument Museum, Brussels

- Archive and Museum for Flemish Way of Living, musical collection – Brussels
- Musical Instrument Museum – Brussels
- Popular Instruments Museum Gooik – Gooik
- South-West Brabant Museum, collection of cellist François Servais and family – Halle
- Jazz Station – Saint-Josse-ten-Noode
- Brabant Center for Music Traditions – Kampenhout
- Museum van de Radio- en Televisie-Omroep (1979–1996†) – Schaerbeek

Limburg

- Stedelijk Beiaardmuseum – Hasselt
- Museum for Musical Instruments Peer (?–2014†) – Peer
- Armand Preud'homme Museum (1990–2018†), dedicated to Armand Preud'homme – Peer

Wallonia

- Mr Sax's House, dedicated to Adolphe Sax – Dinant
- Bell and Carillon Museum (1992–2013†) – Tellin

== Brazil ==
- Museu da Imagem e do Som de Bauru – Bauru
- Museu da Imagem e do Som de Campinas – Campinas
- Museu da Imagem e do Som de Campo Grande – Campo Grande
- Museu da Imagem e do Som do Ceará – Ceará
- Museu da Imagem e do Som de Cuiabá – Cuiabá
- Museu da Imagem e do Som de Alagoas – Maceió
- Museu da Música de Mariana – Minas Gerais
- Museu da Imagem e do Som do Pará – Pará
- Luiz Gonzaga Museum, dedicated to Luiz Gonzaga – Pernambuco
- Carmen Miranda Museum – Rio de Janeiro
- Museu da Imagem e do Som do Rio de Janeiro – Rio de Janeiro
- Villa-Lobos Museum, dedicated to Heitor Villa-Lobos – Rio de Janeiro
- Reggae Maranhão Museum – São Luís
- São Paulo Museum of Image and Sound – São Paulo

== Burkina Faso ==
- Musée de Manega, musical collection – Oubritenga
- National Musical Museum – Ouagadougou

== Canada ==
British Columbia, Alberta and Saskatchewan

- Gervais Wheels Museum – Alida, Saskatchewan
- National Music Centre – Calgary
- Creative Kids Museum, musical collection – Calgary
- Canadian Music Hall of Fame – Calgary
- Canadian Songwriters Hall of Fame – Calgary
- Canadian Country Music Hall of Fame – Merritt
- Revelstoke Nickelodeon Museum – Revelstoke

Nova Scotia and Quebec

- Musée des ondes Emile Berliner dedicated to the history of music recording – Montreal
- Celtic Music Interpretive Centre – Judique
- Hank Snow Home Town Museum, dedicated to Hank Snow – Liverpool
- Musée de l'Accordéon – Montmagny
- Anne Murray Centre, dedicated to Anne Murray – Springhill

Ontario

- Forest City Gallery, musical collection – London
- Youngtown Rock and Roll Museum, dedicated to Neil Young – Omemee
- Franco-Ontarian Folklore Centre – Greater Sudbury
- Shania Twain Centre (2001–2013†), dedicated to Shania Twain – Timmins
- Ontario Science Centre, musical collection – Flemingdon Park, Toronto
- Barn Dance Historical Society Entertainment Museum – Wingham

== Cape Verde ==
- Museu da Tabanka, dedicated to tabanka music – Assomada

== China ==
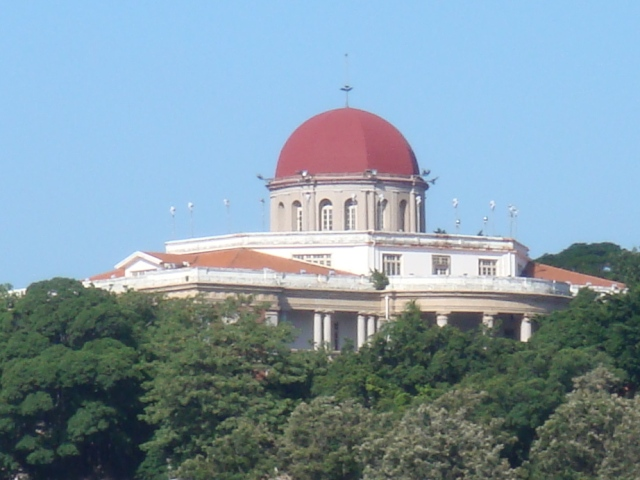
Choir Organ Museum

- Choir Organ Museum – Gulangyu, Fujian
- Gulangyu Piano Museum – Gulangyu, Fujian
- Heilongjiang Music Museum, musical instruments – Harbin, province of Heilongjiang
- Drum Tower of Xi'an – Xi'an, province Shaanxi
- Wuhan Museum, musical instruments collection – Wuhan, province of Hubei

== Czech Republic ==
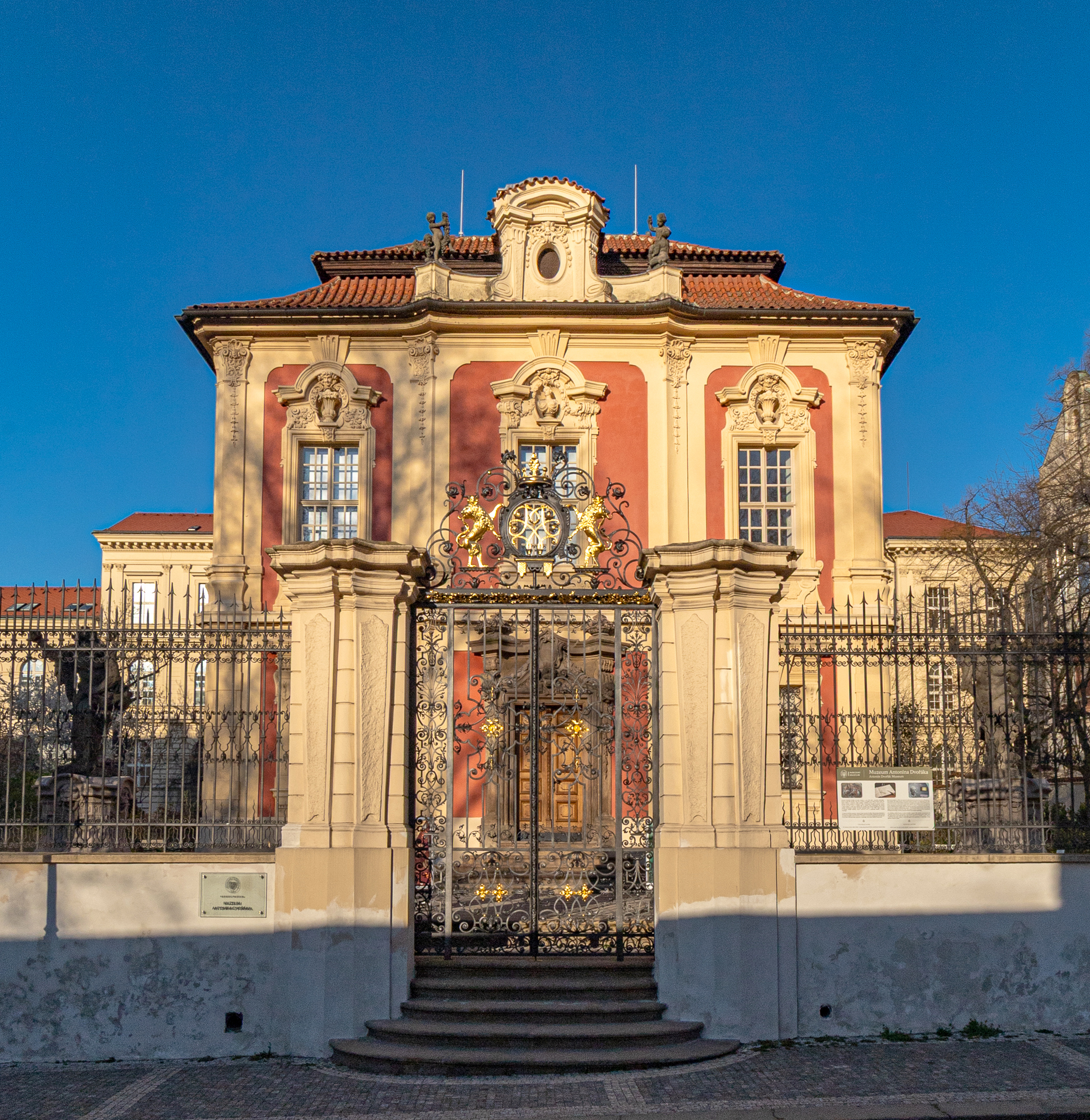
Antonín Dvořák Museum, Prague

Dedicated to composers

dedicated to Antonín Dvořák

- Birth House of Antonín Dvořák – Nelahozeves
- Antonín Dvořák Museum – Prague
- Antonín Dvořák Museum (Sychrov) – Sychrov
- Antonín Dvořák Museum (Vysoké u Příbramě) – Vysoká u Příbramě
- Antonín Dvořák Museum (Zlonicích) – Zlonice

dedicated to Leoš Janáček

- Leoš Janáček Museum (Brno) – Brno
- Leoš Janáček Museum (Hukvaldy) – Hukvaldy

dedicated to Bedřich Smetana

- Bedřich Smetana Museum (Jabkenice) – Jabkenice
- Birth House of Bedřich Smetana – Litomyšl
- Bedřich Smetana Museum (Obříství) – Obříství
- Bedřich Smetana Museum – Prague

dedicated to other composers

- Josef Suk Museum, dedicated to Josef Suk – Křečovice
- Pavel and Antonín Vranický exhibition, dedicated to Paul Wranitzky, Antonín Vranický and Jan Novák – Nová Říše

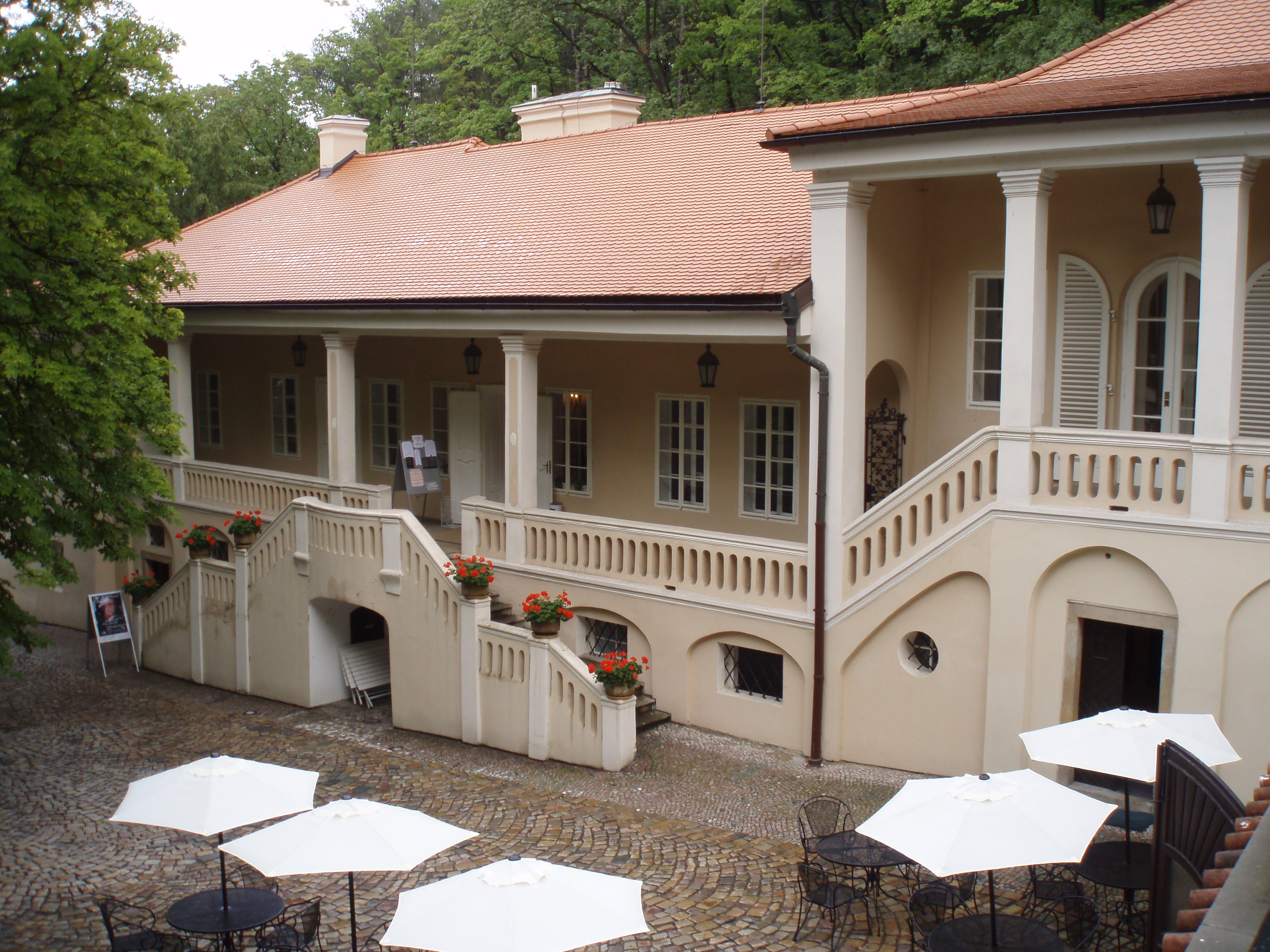
Villa Bertramka

- Centrum Bohuslava Martinů, dedicated to Bohuslav Martinů – Polička
- Bertramka (temporally closed), dedicated to Wolfgang Amadeus Mozart – Prague
- Památník Jaroslava Ježka – Blue Room – Modrý pokoj, dedicated to Jaroslav Ježek – Prague
- Memorial Room František Drdla, dedicated to František Drdla – Žďár nad Sázavou

Other museums

- Music Without Musicians (?–2021†) – Hořovice
- Citerárium – Ostrava
- Czech Musical Museum – Prague
- Lobkowicz Palace, partly dedicated to classical music – Prague
- PopMuseum – Prague
- Museum of folk bands – Lesonice
- Muzeum středního Pootaví, collection bagpipes – Strakonice

== Denmark ==
- Memory Lane Rock Museum – Knebel
- The Danish Music Museum (Musikmuseet) – Copenhagen
- Carl Nielsen Museum, dedicated to Carl Nielsen – Odense
- Memphis Mansion, dedicated to Elvis Presley – Randers
- Museum Ragnarock – Roskilde
- Nysted Orgelmuseum – Nysted

== Estonia ==
- Estonian Theatre and Music Museum – Tallinn

== Finland ==
- Fame, Finnish Music Hall of Fame – Helsinki
- Ainola, dedicated to Jean Sibelius – Järvenpää
- Military Music Museum of Finland – Lahti
- Sibelius Museum, dedicated to Jean Sibelius – Turku
- Mechanical Music Museum – Varkaus
- Villa Kokkonen, dedicated to Joonas Kokkonen – Järvenpää

== France ==
Paris

- Musée des Arts et Métiers – 3rd arrondissement
- Salon Frédéric Chopin, dedicated to Frédéric Chopin – 4th arrondissement
- Army Museum, Cabinet des instruments – 7th arrondissement
- Bibliothèque-Musée de l'Opéra National de Paris – 9th arrondissement
- Musée du Hard Rock Café – 9th arrondissement
- Musée Édith Piaf, dedicated to Édith Piaf – 11th arrondissement
- Musée-Placard d'Erik Satie, dedicated to Erik Satie – 18th arrondissement
- Musée de la Musique – 19th arrondissement
- Phono Museum (France) – 9th arrondissement

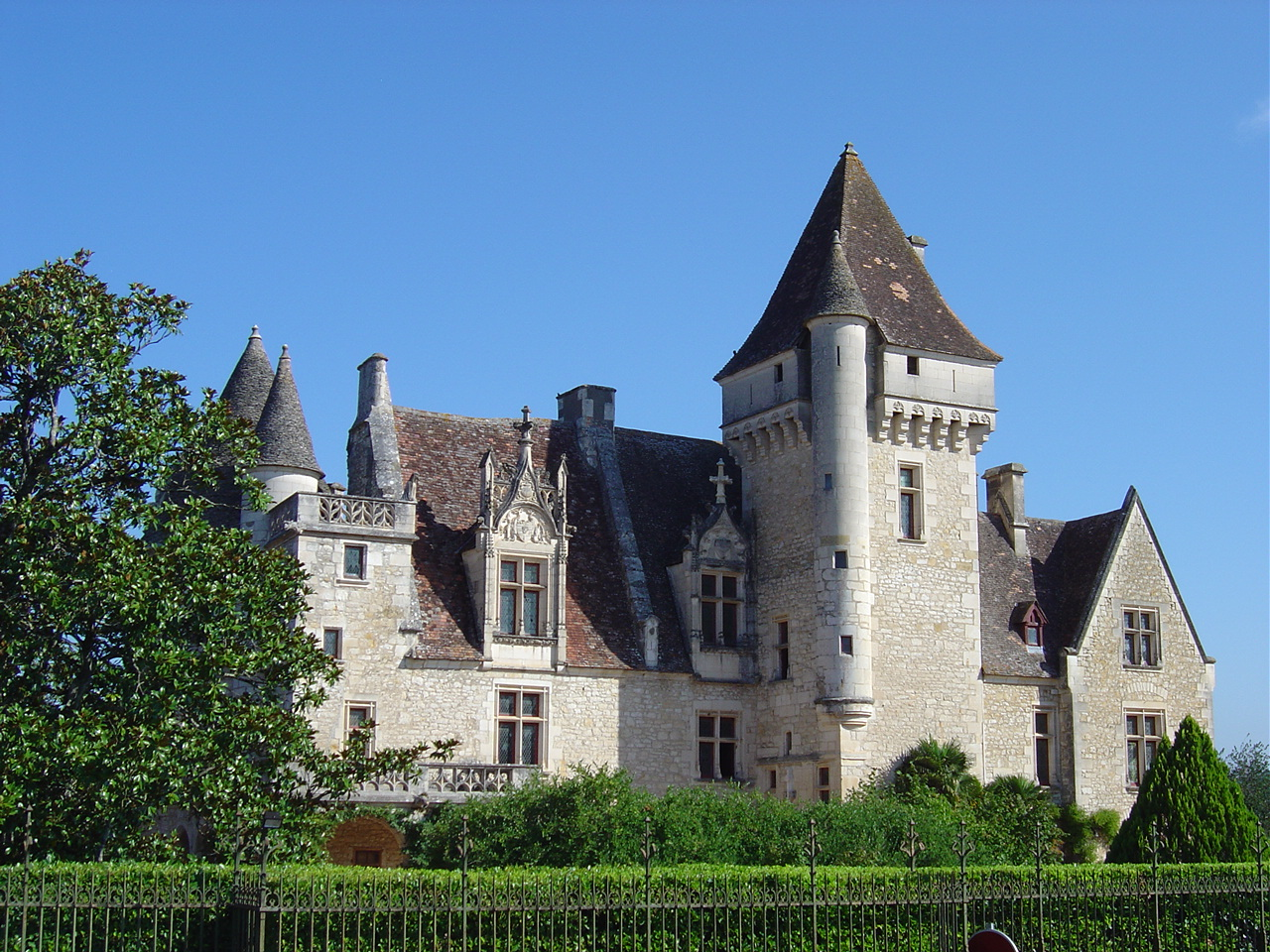
Josephine Baker Museum

Other museums

- Musée de la musique – Anduze
- Josephine Baker Museum, Château des Milandes, dedicated to Josephine Baker – Castelnaud-la-Chapelle
- Museum of Musical Instruments, Céret – Céret
- Musée de l'art forain et de la musique mécanique – Conflans-en-Jarnisy
- Musée Hector-Berlioz – birthplace of Hector Berlioz – La Côte-Saint-André
- Musée des instruments à vent – La Couture-Boussey
- Musée Claude-Debussy, dedicated to Claude Debussy – Saint-Germain-en-Laye
- Musée de la musique mécanique – Les Gets
- Maisons Satie, dedicated to Erik Satie – Honfleur
- Musée européen d'art campanaire – L'Isle-Jourdain, Gers
- Musée du piano de Limoux – Limoux
- Musée de la musique mécanique – Mirecourt
- Musée de la Lutherie et de l'Archèterie françaises – Mirecourt
- Le Belvédère, dedicated to Maurice Ravel – Montfort-l'Amaury
- MuPop – Montluçon
- Palais Lascaris, musical instruments museum – Nice
- Musée de la chanson française – La Planche
- Ferme des orgues – Steenwerck

== Germany ==
Baden-Württemberg

- Brahms House, dedicated to Johannes Brahms – Baden-Baden
- Deutsches Musikautomaten-Museum – Bruchsal
- Bezirksmuseum Buchen, partly dedicated to Joseph Martin Kraus – Buchen
- Augustiner Museum, musical instruments collection – Freiburg
- German Phono Museum – Sankt Georgen im Schwarzwald
- Glockenmuseum Stiftskirche – Herrenberg
- Musikhistorische Sammlung Jehle – Lautlingen, Albstadt
- Museum Bassermannhaus für Musik und Kunst – Mannheim
- House of Music – Stuttgart
- Deutsches Harmonikamuseum – Trossingen
- Elztalmuseum, collection mechanical musical instruments – Waldkirch
- Silcher-Museum, dedicated to Friedrich Silcher – Weinstadt-Schnait

Bavaria

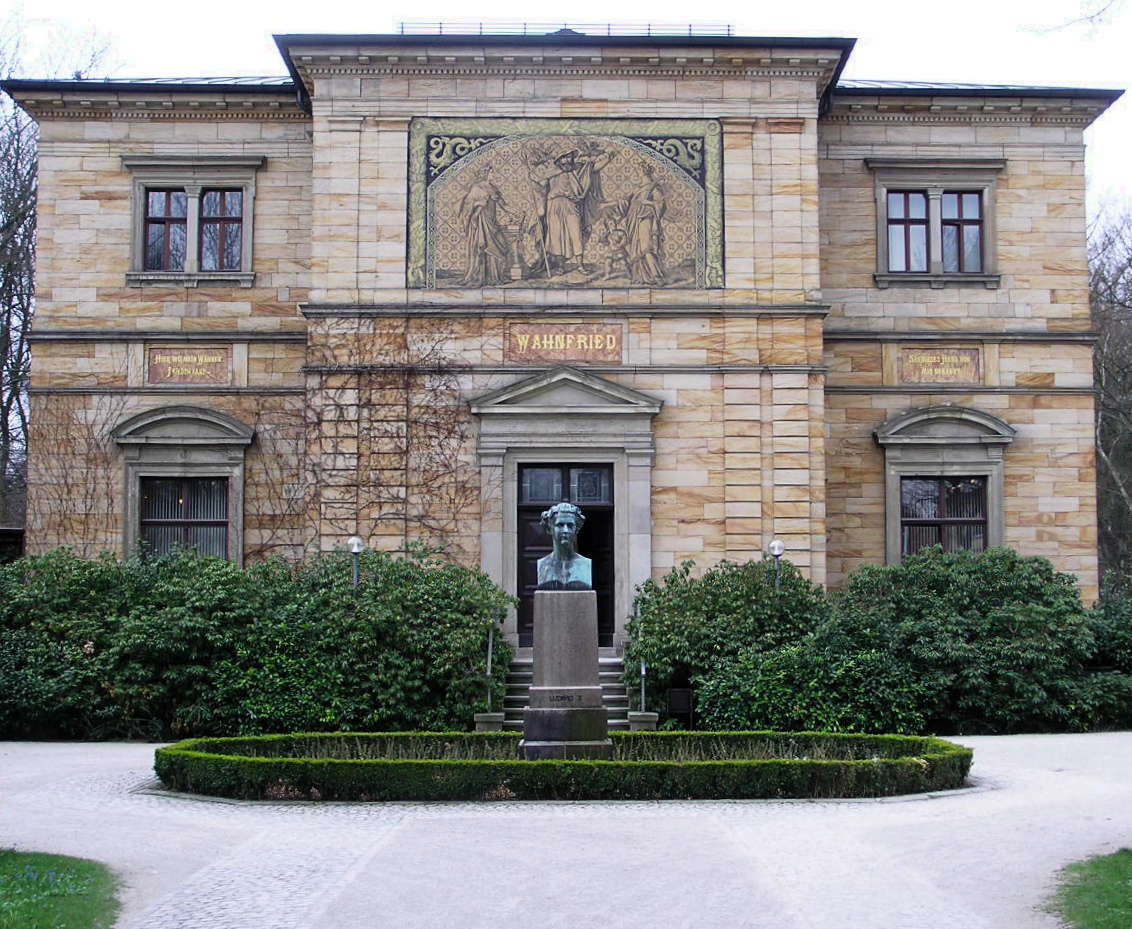
House Wahnfried

- Mozarthaus Augsburg, dedicated to Leopold and Wolfgang Amadeus Mozart – Augsburg
- E.T.A. Hoffmann-Haus, dedicated to E. T. A. Hoffmann – Bamberg
- Franz-Liszt-Museum, dedicated to Franz Liszt – Bayreuth
- House Wahnfried, dedicated to Richard Wagner – Bayreuth
- Heimatmuseum Berching, partly dedicated to Christoph Willibald Gluck – Berching
- Carl Orff Museum, dedicated to Carl Orff – Dießen am Ammersee
- Werner-Egk-Begegnungsstätte, dedicated to Werner Egk – Donauwörth
- Sängermuseum – Feuchtwangen
- Richard-Strauss-Institut, dedicated to Richard Strauss – Garmisch-Partenkirchen
- Geigenbaumuseum – Mittenwald
- Rockmuseum Munich – Munich
- Orgelbaumuseum Ostheim vor der Rhön – Ostheim vor der Rhön
- Stadsmuseum Schwabach, with a collection of Adolf von Henselt – Schwabach
- Orgelzentrum Valley – Valley
- Gebrüder-Lachner-Museum, dedicated to Vinzenz, Franz and Ignaz Lachner – Rain

Berlin and Brandenburg

- Musik-Museum Beeskow – Beeskow
- Brandenburgisches Orgelmuseum – Bad Belzig
- Piano Salon Christophori, dedicated to Bartolomeo Cristofori – Berlin-Gesundbrunnen
- Ramones Museum, dedicated to the Ramones – Berlin-Friedrichshain
- Berlin Musical Instrument Museum – Berlin-Tiergarten
- Kreismuseum Bad Liebenwerda, dedicated to August Friedrich, Johann Gottlieb and Carl Heinrich Graun – Bad Liebenwerda
- Scharwenka Kulturforum, dedicated to Xaver and Philipp Scharwenka – Bad Saarow

Hamburg, Schleswig-Holstein and Mecklenburg-Vorpommern

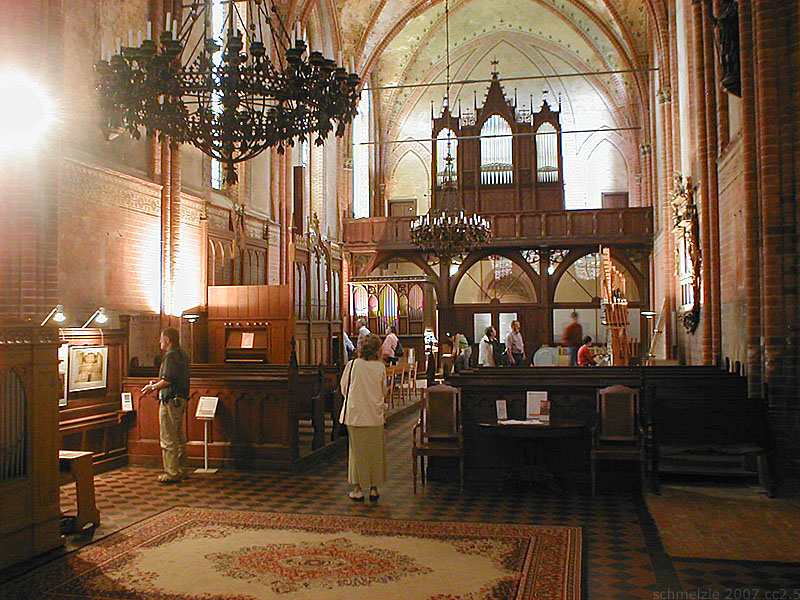
Mecklenburgisches Orgelmuseum

- Ostholstein-Museum Eutin, partly dedicated to Carl Maria von Weber – Eutin
- Brahms-Haus Heide, dedicated to Johannes Brahms – Heide
- Composers Quarter Hamburg – Hamburg-Neustadt
  - Brahms Museum, dedicated to Johannes Brahms
  - Telemann Museum, dedicated to Georg Philipp Telemann
  - Carl Philipp Emanuel Bach Museum, dedicated to Carl Philipp Emanuel Bach
  - Johann Adolph Hasse Museum, dedicated to Johann Adolph Hasse
  - Gustav Mahler Museum, dedicated to Gustav Mahler
  - Fanny & Felix Mendelssohn Museum, dedicated to Fanny and Felix Mendelssohn
- Hamburg Museum, musical collection – Hamburg-Neustadt
- Beatlemania Hamburg (2009–2012†), dedicated to The Beatles – Hamburg-St. Pauli
- Jazz-Museum Bix Eiben (1987–2013†) – Hamburg-Winterhude
- Ostrockmuseum Kröpelin – Kröpelin
- Brahms-Institut, dedicated to Johannes Brahms and other composers – Lübeck
- Mecklenburgisches Orgelmuseum – Malchow

North Rhine-Westphalia, Lower Saxony and Bremen

- Haus Eller, piano museum – Bergheim
- Beethoven House, dedicated to Ludwig van Beethoven – Bonn
- Schumannhaus Bonn, dedicated to Robert Schumann – Bonn-Endenich
- Orgelmuseum Borgentreich – Borgentreich
- Elvis-Presley-Museum Düsseldorf (2011–2013†), dedicated to Elvis Presley – Düsseldorf
- Musikinstrumente- und Puppenmuseum (?–2011†) – Goslar
- rock’n’popmuseum – Gronau
- Haus Kemnade, musical instruments collection – Hattingen
- Klingendes Museum in der Burg Sternberg – Extertal
- Stones Fan Museum, dedicated to The Rolling Stones – Lüchow
- Musik-Museum Monschau (2009–2013†) – Monschau
- Orgelmuseum Fleiter, dedicated to Friedrich Fleiter – Münster-Nienberge
- Harry’s klingendes Museum – Schwarmstedt
- Organeum – Weener

Rhineland-Palatinate, Saarland and Hesse

- Wetterau-Museum, partly dedicated to Elvis Presley – Friedberg
- Hindemith Kabinett, dedicated to Paul Hindemith – Frankfurt
- Museum of Modern Electronic Music – Frankfurt
- Spohr Museum, dedicated to Louis Spohr – Kassel
- Mutter-Beethoven-Haus, dedicated to Ludwig van Beethoven – Koblenz
- Musical Instruments Museum Lißberg – Ortenberg-Lißberg
- Siegfrieds Mechanisches Musikkabinett – Rüdesheim am Rhein
- Musikantenland Museum – Thallichtenberg
- orgelARTmuseum – Windesheim

Saxony and Saxony-Anhalt

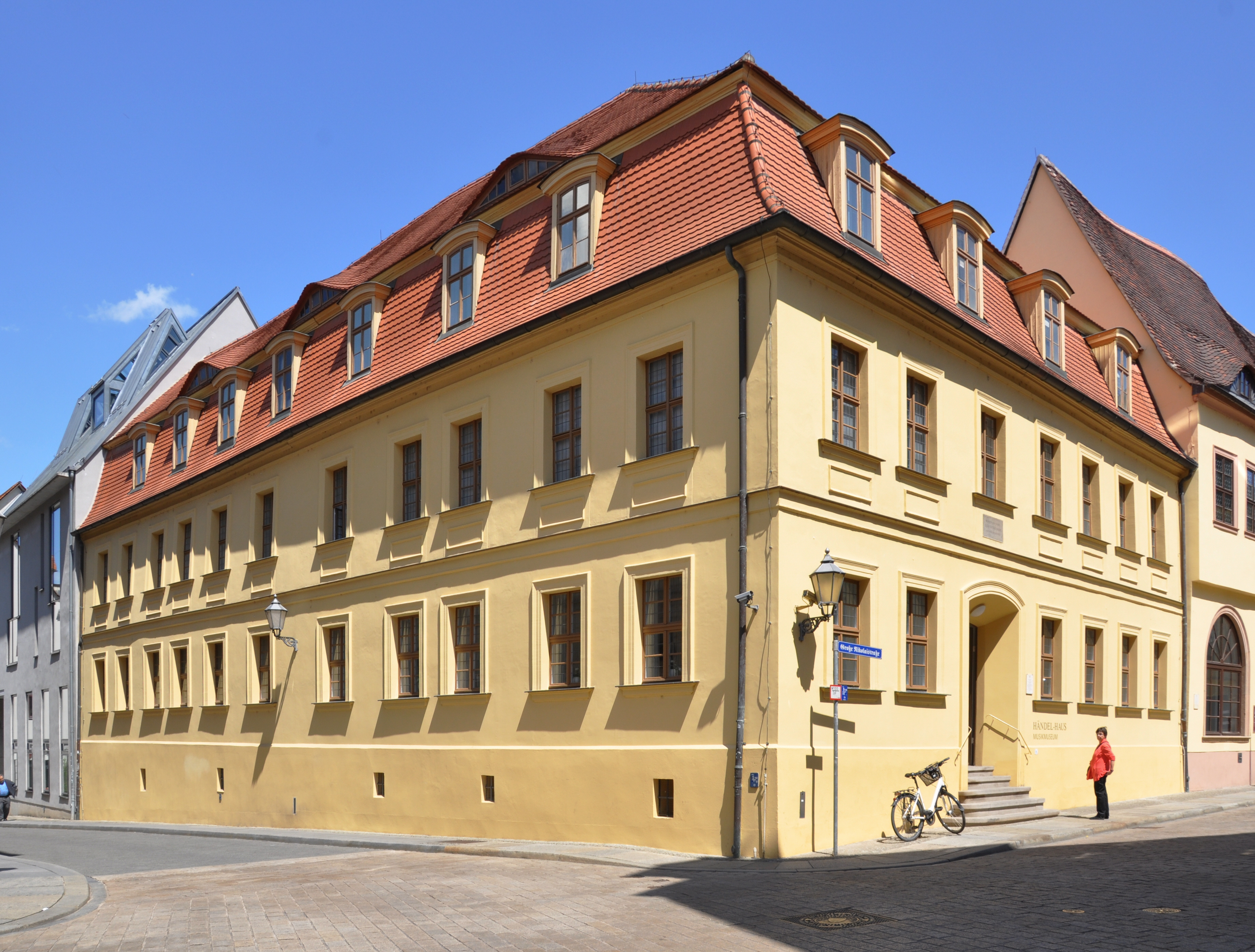
Handel House

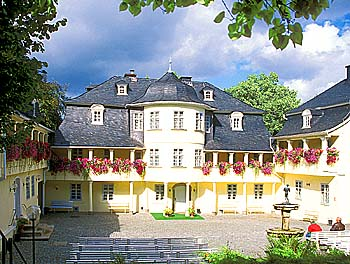
Musical Instruments Museum, Markneukirchen

- Villa Teresa, dedicated to Eugen d'Albert and Teresa Carreño – Coswig
- Kurt Weill Centre, dedicated to Kurt Weill – Dessau-Roßlau
- Carl Maria von Weber Museum, dedicated to Carl Maria von Weber – Dresden-Hosterwitz
- Richard-Wagner-Stätten Graupa, dedicated to Richard Wagner – Dresden-Graupa
- Gottfried-Silbermann-Museum, dedicated to Gottfried Silbermann – Frauenstein
- Mauersberger-Museum, dedicated to Rudolf and Erhard Mauersberger – Großrückerswalde
- Beatles-Museum Halle, dedicated to The Beatles – Halle
- Wilhelm Friedemann Bach House, dedicated to seven composers – Halle
- Handel House, dedicated to Georg Friedrich Händel – Halle
- Orgelbaumuseum Klosterhäseler – Klosterhäseler
- Historisches Museum & Bachgedenkstätte, collection Johann Sebastian Bach – Köthen
- Mendelssohn House, Leipzig, dedicated to Felix and Fanny Mendelssohn – Leipzig
- Leipzig Bach Museum, dedicated to Johann Sebastian Bach – Leipzig
- Grieg-Begegnungsstätte, dedicated to Edvard Grieg – Leipzig
- Museum of Musical Instruments of Leipzig University – Leipzig
- Schumann House, Leipzig, dedicated to Robert and Clara Schumann – Leipzig
- Carl-Loewe-Museum, dedicated to Carl Loewe – Löbejün
- Musikinstrumenten-Museum Markneukirchen – Markneukirchen
- Lindenmuseum Clara Schumann, dedicated to Clara Schumann – Müglitztal
- Reinhard-Keiser-Gedenkstätte, dedicated to Reinhard Keiser, Johann Christian Schieferdecker, Johann David Heinichen, and Johann Friedrich Fasch – Teuchern
- Heinrich Schütz House, dedicated to Heinrich Schütz – Weißenfels
- Robert Schumann House, dedicated to Robert Schumann – Zwickau

Thuringia

- Schlossmuseum Arnstadt, partly dedicated to Johann Sebastian Bach – Arnstadt
- Thüringer Orgelmuseum (1988–2009†) – Bechstedtstraß
- Bachhaus, dedicated to Johann Sebastian Bach – Eisenach
- Reuter-Wagner-Museum, dedicated to Richard Wagner – Eisenach
- Heinrich Schütz House, dedicated to Heinrich Schütz – Bad Köstritz
- Max-Reger-Archiv, dedicated to Max Reger – Meiningen
- Museum im Schloss Elisabethenburg, musical history and instruments – Meiningen
- Bach-Stammhaus, dedicated to the Bach family and violins craft – Wechmar
- Liszt-Haus Weimar, dedicated to Franz Liszt – Weimar

== Ghana ==
- Gramophone Records Museum and Research Centre of Ghana – Cape Coast

== Greece ==
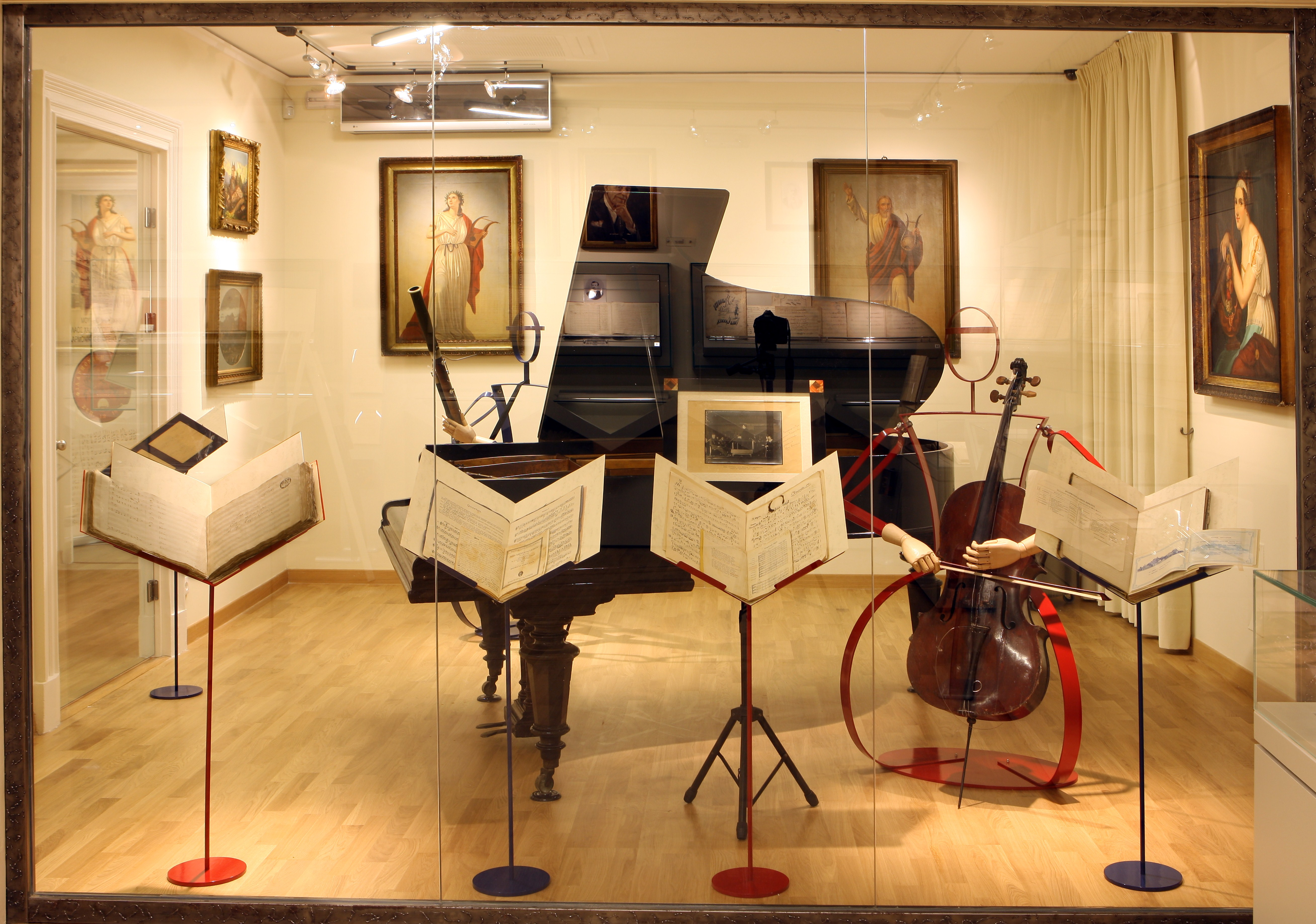
Philharmonic Society of Corfu

- Maria Callas Museum – Athens
- Museum of Greek Folk Musical Instruments – Plaka, Athens
- Music Museum "Nikolaos Chalikiopoulos Mantzaros", dedicated to Nikolaos Mantzaros – Corfu
- Museum of Ancient Greek, Byzantine and Post-Byzantine Musical Instruments – Thessaloniki
- Musical Museum of Macedonia – Thessaloniki

== Guatemala ==
- Museo Casa K'ojom, at the Centro Cultural la Azotea, dedicated to Maya music – Jocotenango, Sacatepéquez

== Hungary ==
Budapest

- House of Music Hungary
- Béla Bartók Memorial House, dedicated to Béla Bartók
- Frans Liszt Memorial Museum, dedicated to Franz Liszt
- Zoltán Kodály Memorial Museum, dedicated to Zoltán Kodály
- Museum of Music History

Other museums

- Egri Road Beatles Múzeum, dedicated to The Beatles – Eger
- Beethoven Memorial Museum, dedicated to Ludwig van Beethoven – Martonvásár

== Iceland ==
- The Eurovision Museum – Húsavík
- The Icelandic Museum of Rock 'n' Roll – Reykjanesbær
- Folk Music Centre – Siglufjörður

== India ==
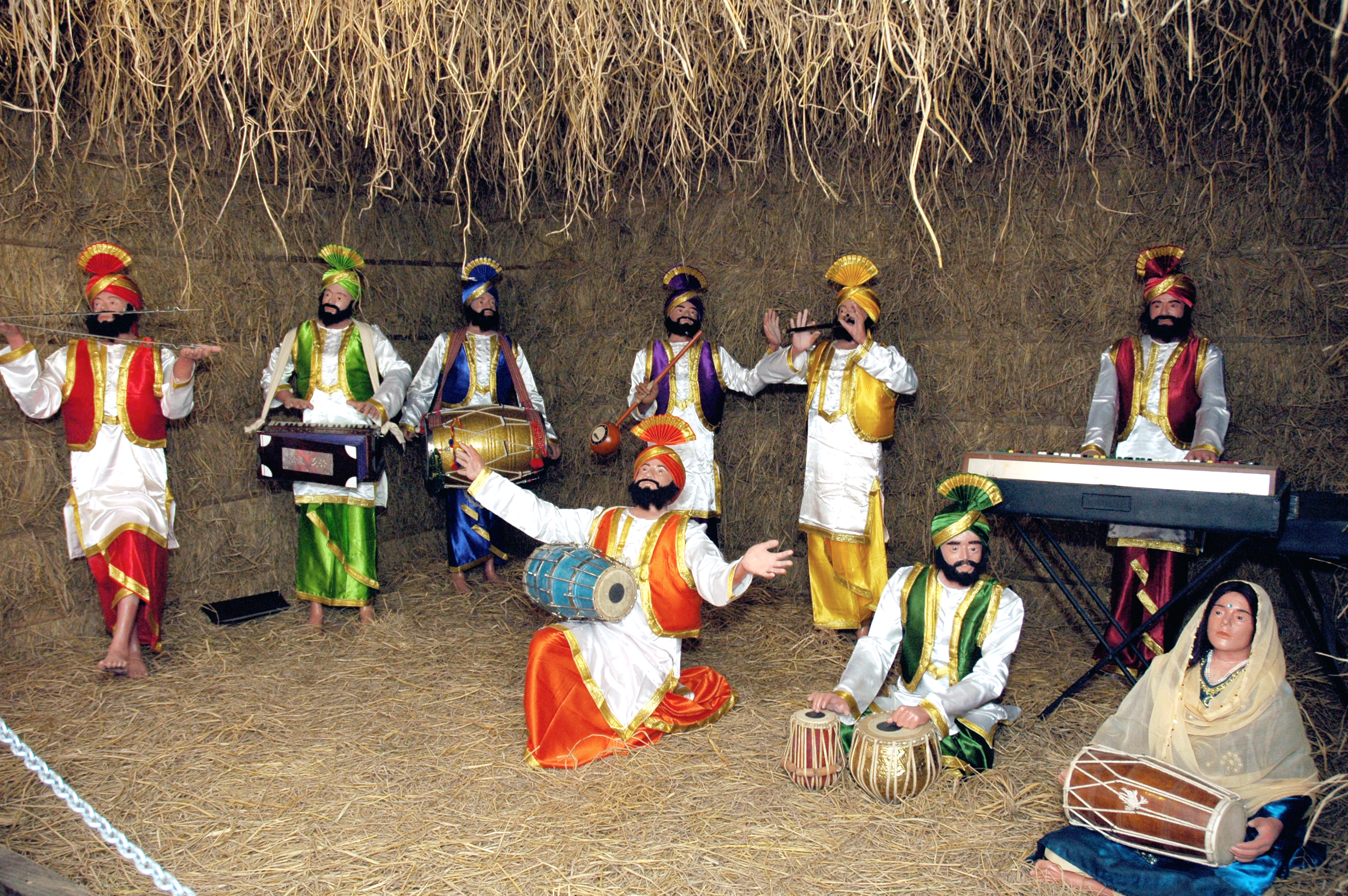
Melody World Wax Museum, Mysore

- Indian Music Experience Museum: an interactive music museum – Bangalore
- Karnataka Folk Museum, musical collection – Bangalore
- Melody World Wax Museum, musical instruments collection (tribal, ethnic, folk & modern) – Mysore

== Indonesia ==
- Museum Musik Indonesia – Malang

== Iran ==
- Iran Museum of Music – Tehran

== Ireland ==
- Irish Rock N Roll Museum – Dublin
- Irish Music Hall of Fame (1999–2001†) – Dublin

== Israel ==
- the Hebrew Music Museum – Jerusalem
- Violins of Hope – Tel Aviv

== Italy ==
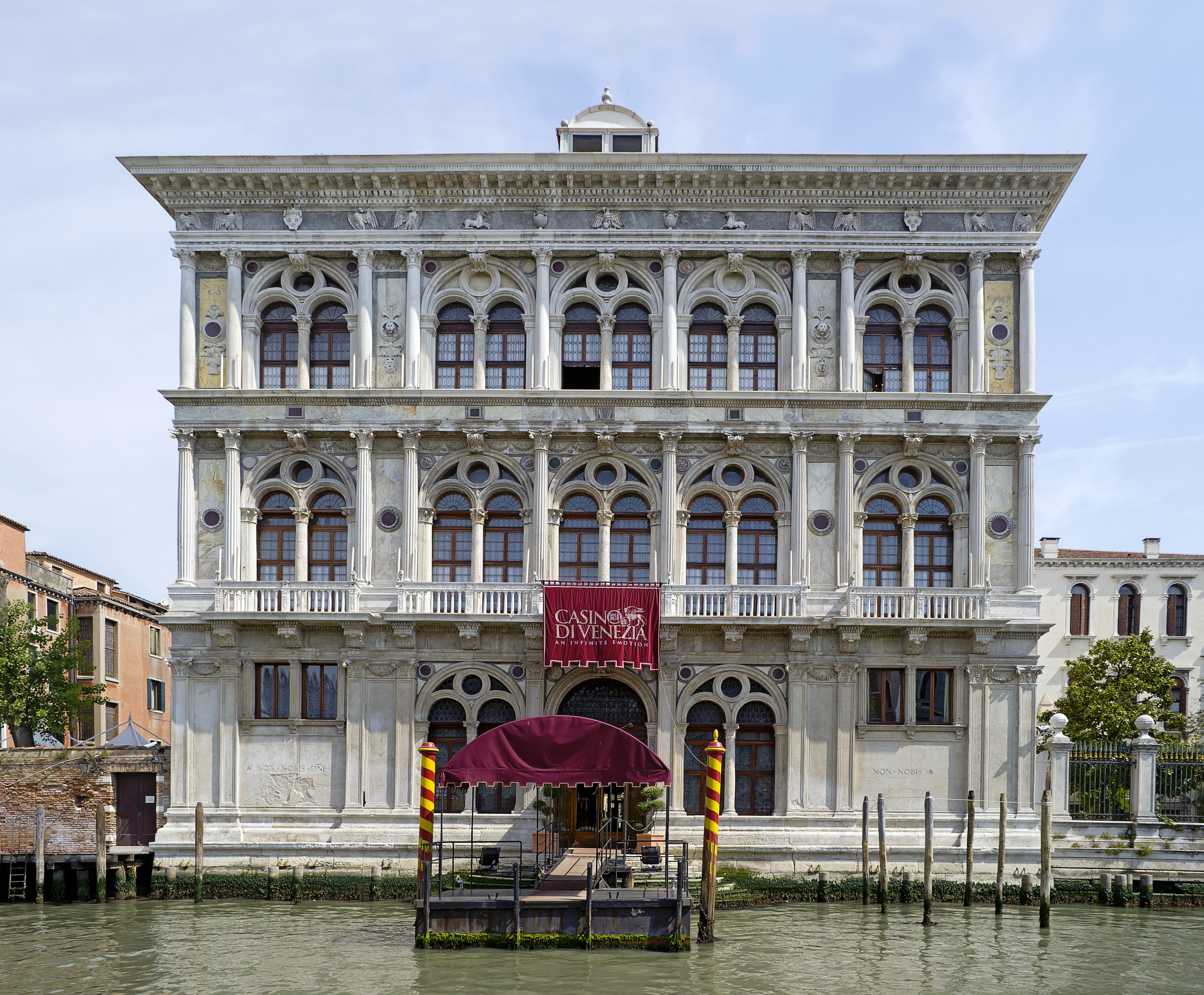
Museo Wagner, Venice

Northern Italy

- Museo Pietro Abbà-Cornaglia – Alessandria
- Gustav Mahler Stube, with memorial dedicated to Gustav Mahler – Altschluderbach, Toblach
- Donizetti's birthplace, dedicated to Gaetano Donizetti – Bergamo
- Donizetti Museum, dedicated to Gaetano Donizetti – Bergamo
- Museo internazionale e biblioteca della musica – Bologna
- Oratorium of San Colombano – Bologna
- Museo nazionale Giuseppe Verdi, dedicated to Giuseppe Verdi – Busseto
- Casa natale di Giuseppe Verdi, dedicated to Giuseppe Verdi – Busseto
- Villa Verdi, dedicated to Giuseppe Verdi – Busseto
- Civic Museum of Crema, musical collection – Crema
- Museo del violino – Cremona
- Museo Civico Ala Ponzone – Cremona
- Museum Via del Campo 29 rosso, dedicated to Fabrizio De André – Genoa
- Jazz Museum of Genoa – Genoa
- Collezione Didattica piccolo Museo della Musica– Lodi
- Fondo Musicale Greggiati, dedicated to Giuseppe Greggiati – Mantua
- Museum of Musical Instruments – Milan
- Museo Teatrale alla Scala, musical collection – Milan
- Casa Museo Luciano Pavarotti, dedicated to Luciano Pavarotti – Modena
- Casa natale di Arturo Toscanini, dedicated to Arturo Toscanini – Parma
- Museo storico Riccardo Barilla del Conservatorio di Parma – Parma
- Museum of Instruments for Popular Music – Roncegno
- Museo Etnografico e dello Strumento Musicale a Fiato – Quarna Sotto
- Museo del disco d'epoca – Sogliano al Rubicone
- Civico museo teatrale Carlo Schmidl, musical collection – Trieste
- Museo della Canzone – Vallecrosia
- San Maurizio, dedicated to music of Baroque Venice – Venice
- Museo Wagner, dedicated to Richard Wagner – Ca' Vendramin Calergi, Venice
- Arena MuseOpera, AMO – Verona

Central Italy

- Museo internazionale della fisarmonica – Castelfidardo
- Museo degli strumenti musicali (Firenze) – Florence
- Museo Enrico Caruso, dedicated to Enrico Caruso – Lastra a Signa
- Museo Gaspare Spontini, dedicated to Gaspare Spontini – Maiolati Spontini
- Organ Museum Santa Cecilia – Massa Marittima
- Collezione Titta Ruffo, dedicated to Titta Ruffo – Pisa
- Casa Natale di Rossini, dedicated to Gioachino Rossini – Pesaro
- Accademia Nazionale di Santa Cecilia Musical Instruments Museum – Rome
- Museo Storico, part of the Teatro Argentina – Rome
- Museo nazionale degli strumenti musicali – Rome
- Museo della Zampogna, bagpipe museum – Scapoli
- Accademia Musicale Chigiana – Siena
- Museo della musica – Talla
- Villa Puccini, estate of Giacomo Puccini – Torre del Lago

Southern Italy

- Museum of Multiethnic Musical Instruments "Fausto Cannone" – Alcamo
- Museum of Castle of Gesualdo, dedicated to Carlo Gesualdo – Gesualdo
- Museum for Calabrian Popular Music and Musical Instruments – Isca sullo Ionio
- Museum of the Conservatory San Pietro a Majella – Naples
- Cultural Centre Leonida Repaci, partly dedicated to Francesco Cilea and Nicola Manfroce – Palmi, Reggio Calabria

== Jamaica ==
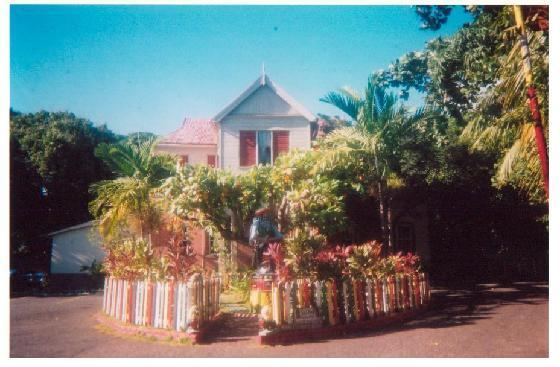
Bob Marley Museum

- Bob Marley Museum, dedicated to Bob Marley – Nine Mile
- Bob Marley Mausoleum – Kingston

== Japan ==
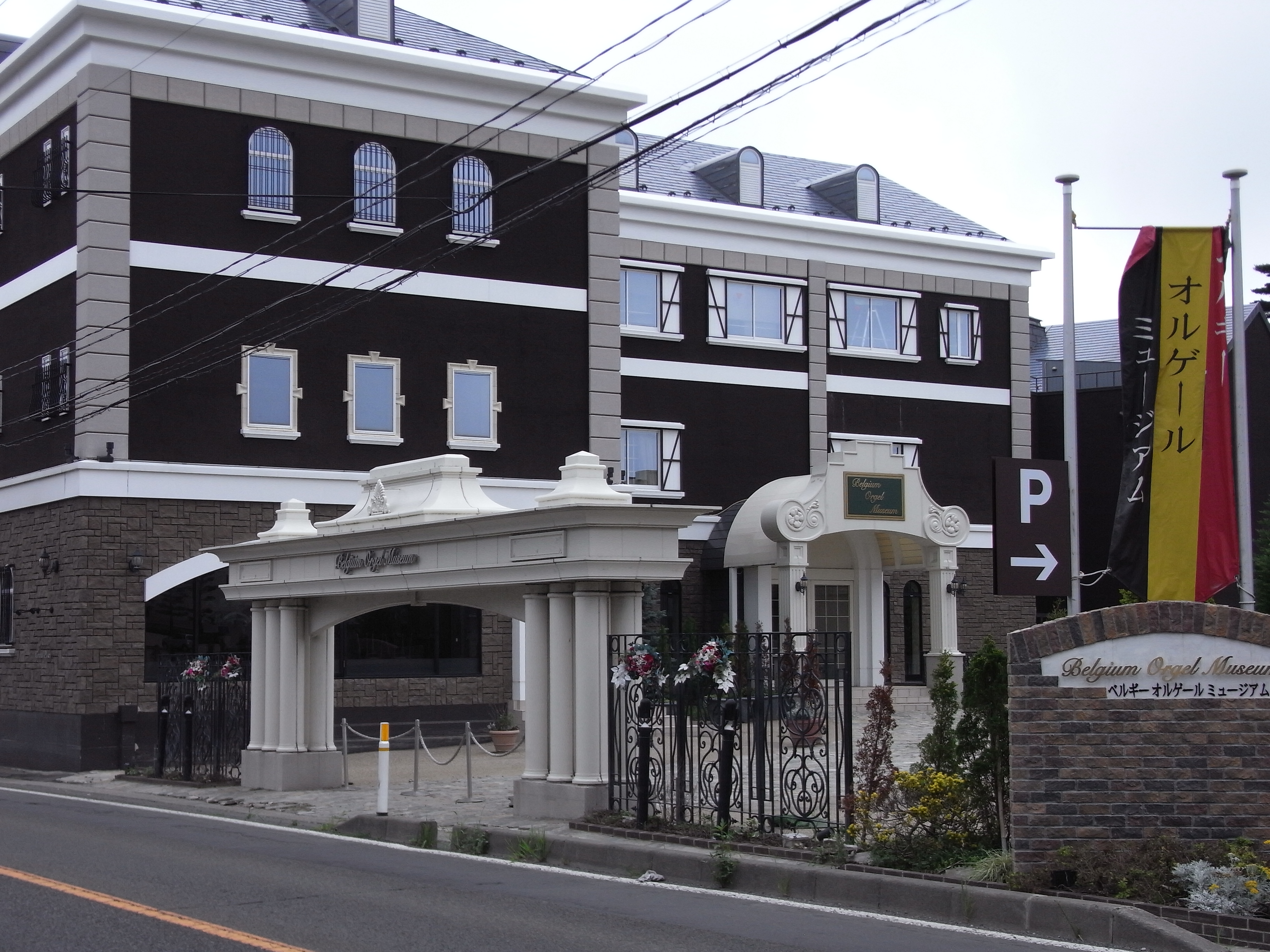
Belgium Organ Museum

Tokyo

- Michio Miyagi Memorial Hall, dedicated to Michio Miyagi
- Orugōru no Chiisana Hakubutsukan (?–2013†), mechanical musical instruments
- Museum of the Musashino Academia Musicae
- Min-On Musical Museum

Other museums

- Mandolin Melodies Museum – Aichi
- Kawaguchiko Music Box Forest – Fujikawaguchiko
- Musical Instruments Museum – Hamamatsu
- Musicbox Museum Izu – Izu, Itō
- Rokko Musicbox Museum – Kobe
- The Museum, successor of Belgium Organ Museum – Matsushima
- Misasa Violin Museum – Misasa
- Nasu Music Box Museum – Nasu
- Onyoku Loudspeaker Museum – Saikai
- Horie Organ Museum – Nishinomiya
- Japan Museum of Contemporary Toy & Hall of Music Box – Mimasaka
- Musical Museum of the Music College – Osaka
- Otaru Music Box Museum – Otaru
- John Lennon Museum (2000–2010†), dedicated to John Lennon – Saitama
- Musicbox Museum of Lake Hamana – Shizuoka
- ARSBEL (2000–2010†), organ museum – Tendō

== Kazakhstan ==
- Kazakh Museum of Folk Musical Instruments – Almaty
- Tlendiyev Memorial Museum, dedicated to Nurgisa Tlendiyev – Almaty

== Latvia ==
- Krišjānis Barons Memorial Museum, devoted to folklorist Krišjānis Barons and his work collecting Latvian folk songs (Dainas) – Riga

== Lithuania ==
- Povilas Stulga Museum of Lithuanian Folk Instruments, named after Povilas Stulga – Kaunas
- Lithuanian Theater, Music and Cinema Museum – Vilnius

== Madagascar ==
- University of Madagascar's Museum of Art and Archaeology, collection of musical instruments – Antananarivo

== Mexico ==
- Museum of the Yucatecan Song – Mérida
- Casa de la Música Mexicana – Mexico City
- National Musical Library – Mexico City

== Mongolia ==
- Mongolian Theatre Museum – Ulaanbaatar

== Netherlands ==
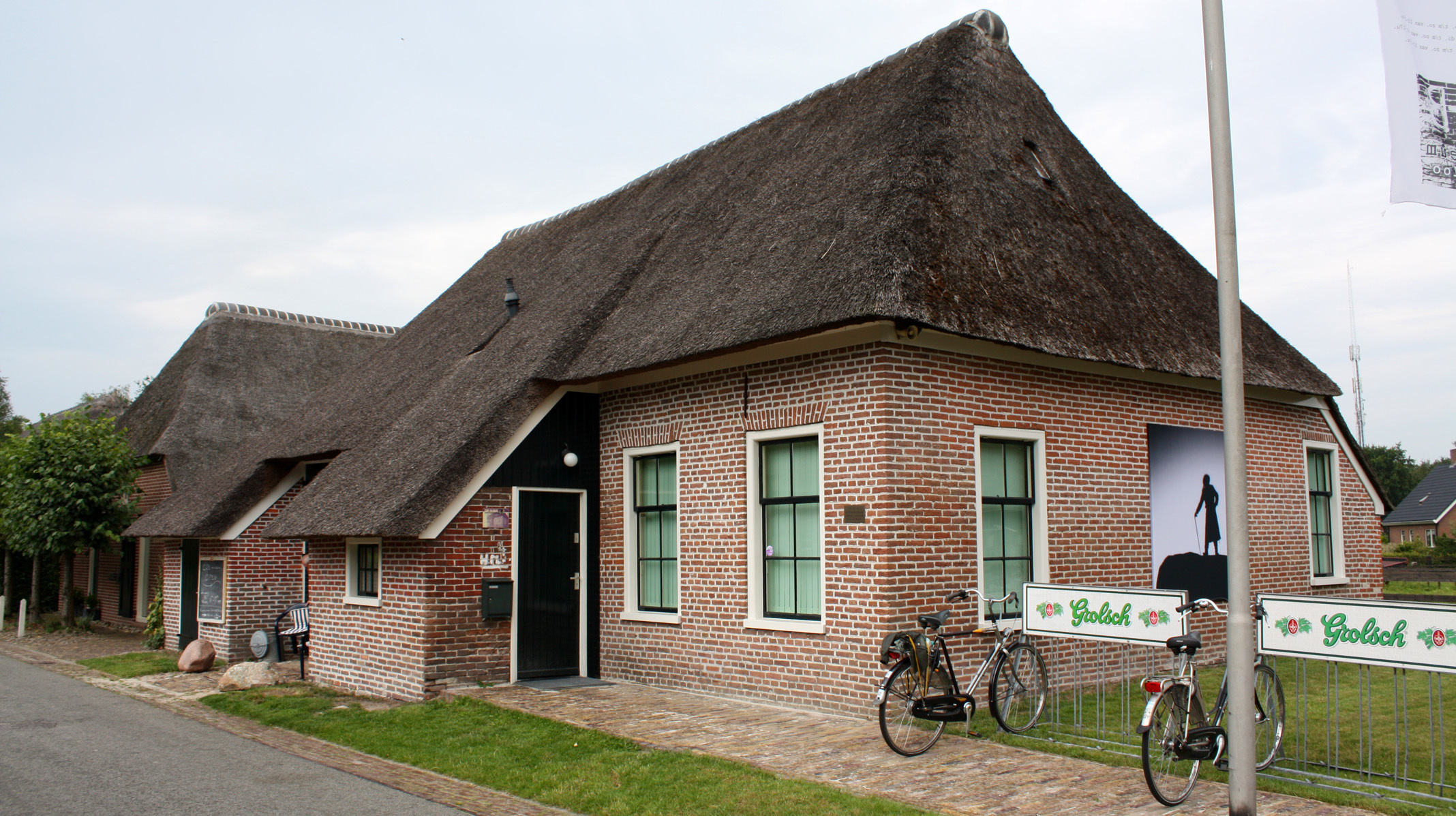
C+B Museum – Grolloo

North

- Barrel Organ Museum Assen (1987–2008†) – Assen
- Harmonium Museum Netherlands – Barger-Compascuum
- Museum Vosbergen – Eelde
- Accordeon Museum Harte Meijer – Gasselternijveenschemond
- C+B Museum, dedicated to Cuby + Blizzards – Grolloo
- Elvis Presley Museum Molkwerum, dedicated to Elvis Presley – Molkwerum
- Museum Musica – Stadskanaal
- Barrel Organ Museum Folkloreklanken (2008–2012†) – de Wijk

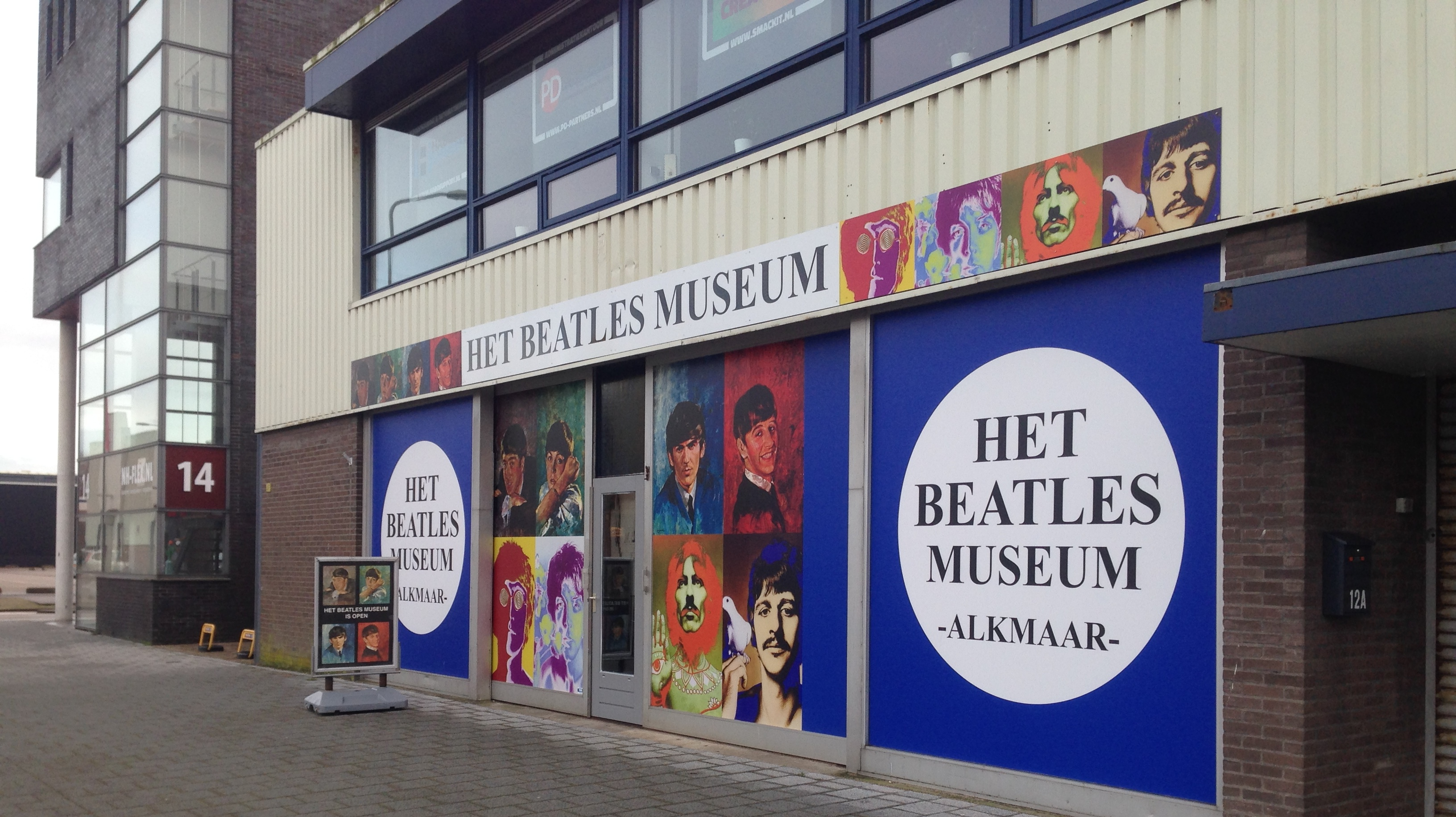
Beatles Museum – Alkmaar

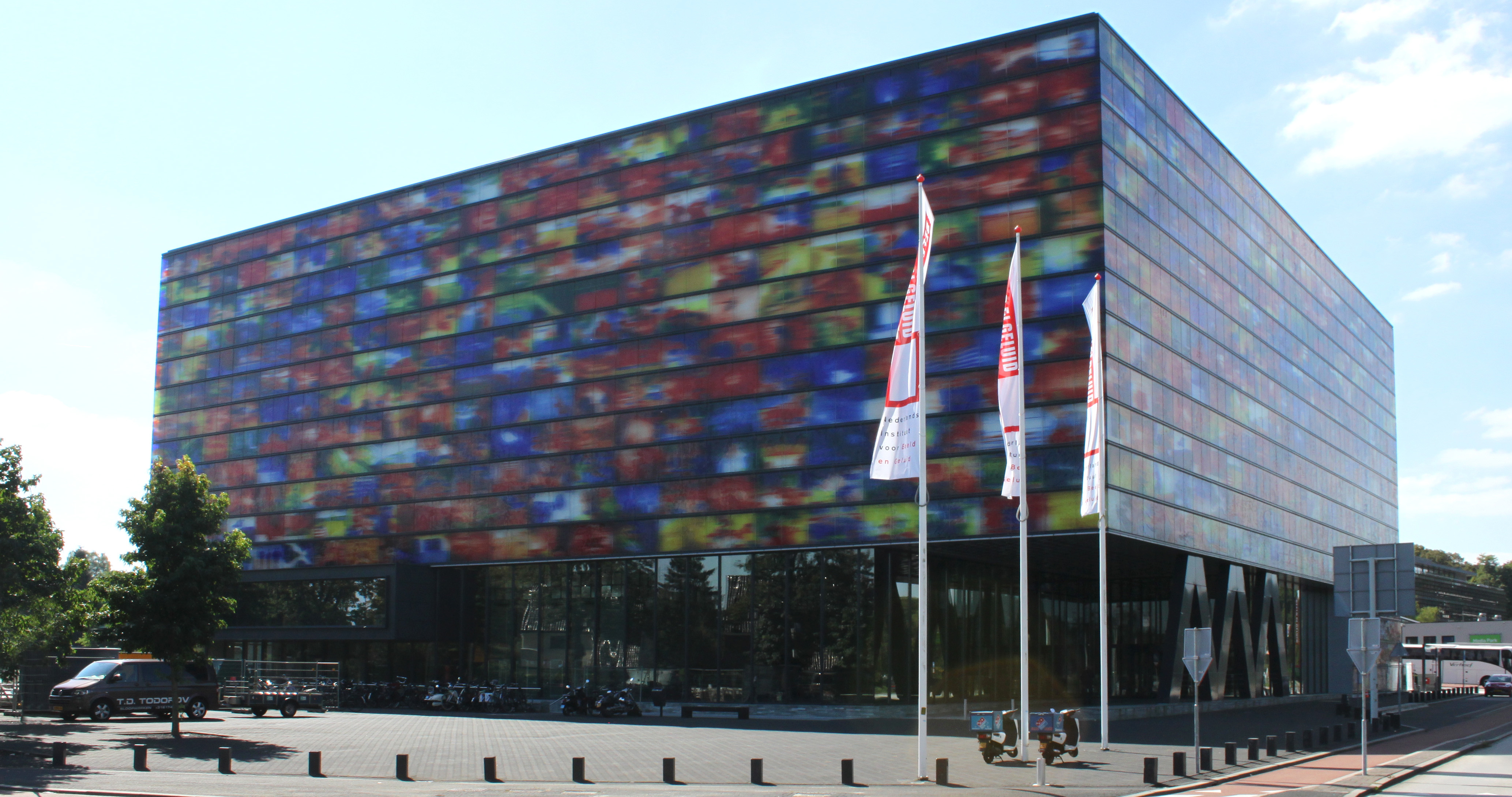
Sound and Vision – Hilversum

West

- Beatles Museum Alkmaar, dedicated to The Beatles – Alkmaar
- Geelvinck Early Piano Museum – Amsterdam
- Museum Geelvinck-Hinlopen (1991–2015†) – Amsterdam
- Willy Alberti Museum (1997–2014), dedicated to Willy Alberti – Amsterdam
- G. Perlee Barrel Organ Museum – Amsterdam
- Geelvinck Pianola Museum – Amsterdam
- Gemeentemuseum Den Haag, musical collection – The Hague
- Music History Museum Scheurleer (1905–1935†) – The Hague
- Barrel Organ Museum Haarlem – Haarlem
- Netherlands Institute for Sound and Vision – Hilversum
- Museum RockArt – Hook of Holland
- Palingsound Museum – Volendam
- Musical Information and Documentation Centre Ton Stolk – Vlaardingen

Centre and east

- Watch & Listen Museum – Bennekom
- Elvis Presley Museum Culemborg (2002-2021), dedicated to Elvis Presley – Culemborg
- National Organ Museum – Elburg
- Museum Geelvinck Kolthoorn – Heerde
- Accordeon Museum De Muse – Malden
- Gramophone Museum – Nieuwleusen
- 192 & Demis Roussos Museum, dedicated to Radio Veronica and Demis Roussos – Nijkerk
- Harmonium Museum Paasloo – Paasloo, Steenwijkerland
- Museum Speelklok – Utrecht
- Geelvinck Music Museum Zutphen (2016–2019†) – Zutphen
- Herman Brood Museum & Experience – Zwolle

South

- Museum Klok & Peel – Asten
- Gavioli Hall, named after Anselmo Gavioli – Helmond
- Museum Dansant – Hilvarenbeek
- Jukebox Museum – Sint-Oedenrode
- Kessels, Muziek Instrumenten Tilburg – Tilburg

== New Zealand ==
- Whittaker's Live Musical Museum– Auckland
- Elvis Presley Museum (Hawera), dedicated to Elvis Presley – Hawera
- Lilburn Residence, dedicated to Douglas Lilburn – Wellington

== Norway ==
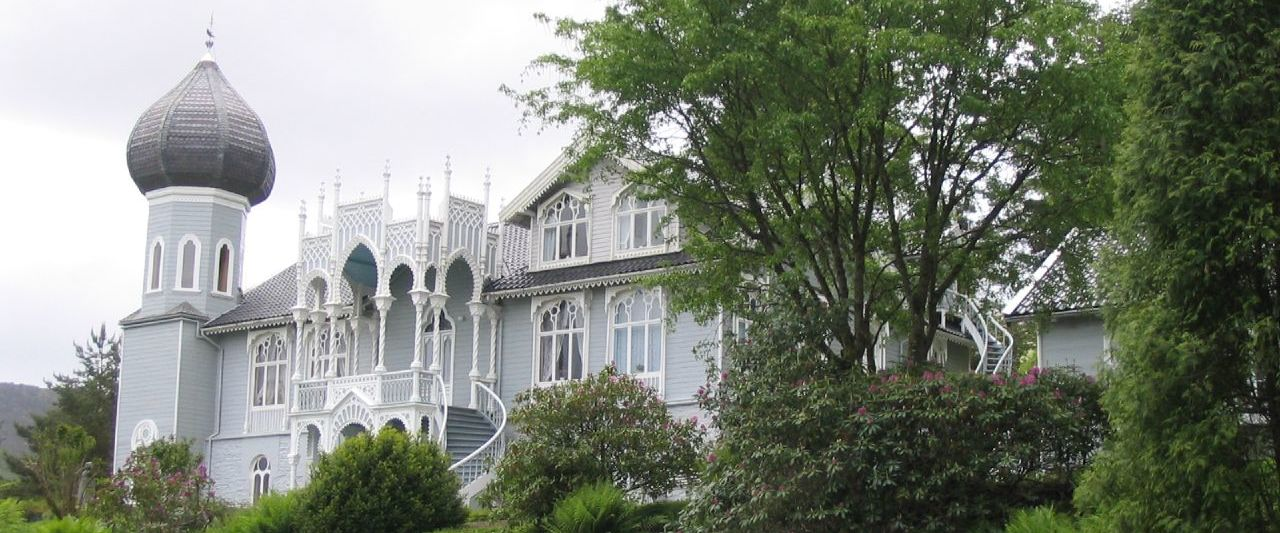
Villa Lysøen

- Edvard Grieg Museum Troldhaugen, dedicated to Edvard Grieg - Bergen, Vestland
- Siljustøl, dedicated to Harald Sæverud – Bergen, Vestland
- Kirsten Flagstad Museum, dedicated to Kirsten Flagstad – Hamar, Innlandet
- Ringve Museum – Lade, Trøndelag
- Villa Lysøen, dedicated to Ole Bull – Bjørnafjorden, Vestland
- Rockheim – Trondheim, Trøndelag
- Myllarheimen, dedicated to Torgeir Augundsson – Vinje, Telemark

== Philippines ==
- Jose R. Gullas Halad Museum – Cebu City

== Poland ==
Dedicated to composers

dedicated to Frédéric Chopin

- Fryderyk Chopin Museum – Warsaw
- Chopin family parlor – Warsaw
- Birthplace of Frédéric Chopin – Żelazowa Wola

dedicated to other musicians

- Feliks Nowowiejski Music Salon Museum, dedicated to Feliks Nowowiejski – Barczewo
- Villa Atma, dedicated to Karol Szymanowski – Zakopane
- Museum of Vladimir Vysotsky in Koszalin, dedicated to Vladimir Vysotsky – Koszalin

Other museums

- Museum of the Polish National Anthem – Będomin
- Museum of Silesian Pipe Organs – Katowice
- Musical Instruments Museum in Poznań – Poznań
- Musical Instruments Museum in Szyba – Szyba
- Museum of Folk Musical Instruments – Szydłowiec
- Museum of Kashubian and Pomeran Literature and Music – Wejherowo

== Portugal ==
- Museum of Portuguese Music – Estoril
- Fado Museum – Lisbon
- Museu Nacional da Música – Lisbon
- Museum of the Hot Club of Portugal – Lisbon
- Stringed Instruments Museum, string instruments museum – Tebosa
- Museu Fernando Lopes-Graça, dedicated to Fernando Lopes-Graça – Tomar

== Puerto Rico ==
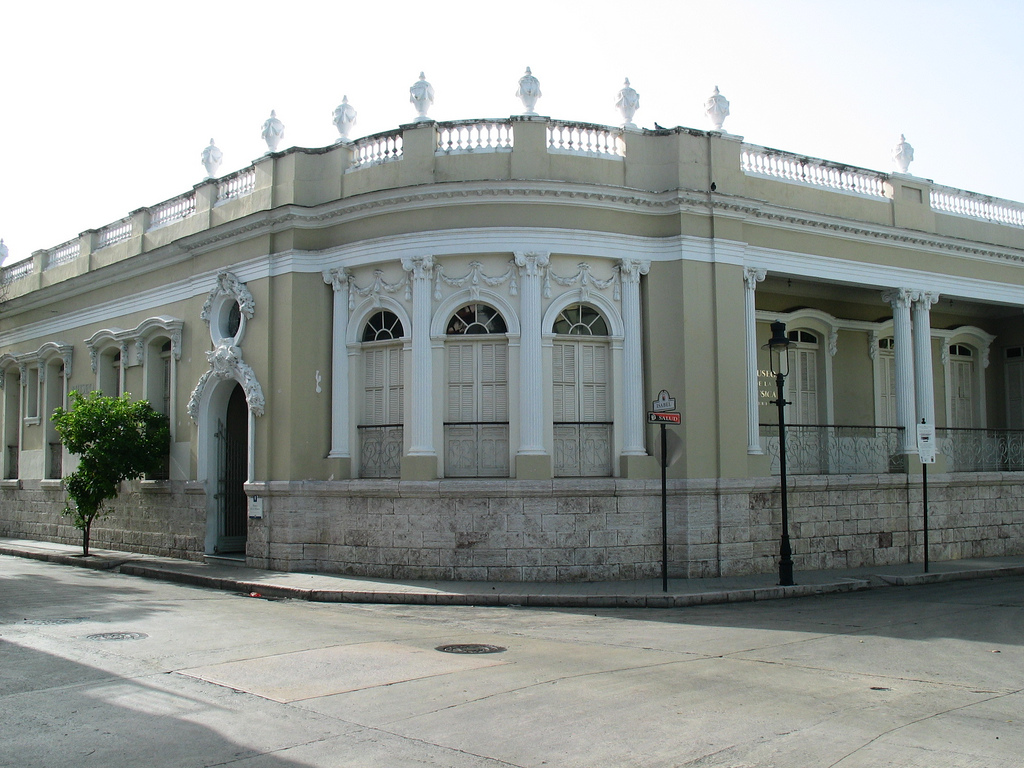
Museo de la Música Puertorriqueña

- Casa del Compositor Héctor Flores Osuna, dedicated to Héctor Flores Osuna – Caguas
- Casa del Trovador – Caguas
- Centro Musical Criollo José Ignacio Quintón, dedicated to José Ignacio Quintón – Caguas
- Casa Paoli, dedicated to Antonio Paoli – Barrio Cuarto, Ponce
- Museo de la Música Puertorriqueña – Barrio Tercero, Ponce
- Pablo Casals Museum – San Juan
- Museum of Reggaeton and Daddy Yankee – at Plaza Las Américas Mall

== Reunion ==
- Maison Morange, also 'Musée des musiques et instruments de l'océan Indien' – Hell-Bourg

== Romania ==
- Luminiș Villa, dedicated to George Enescu – Cumpătu, Sinaia

== Russia ==
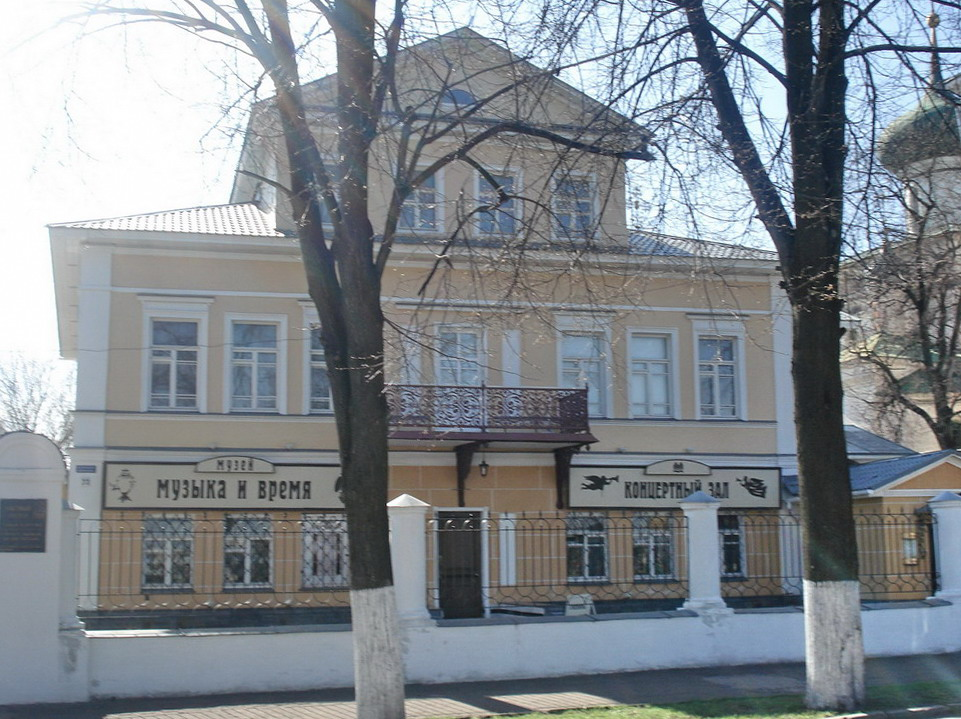
Museum of Music and Time

Moscow

- Glinka Museum
- Harmonica Museum, dedicated to Alfred Mirek
- Museum of Vladimir Vysotsky at Taganka Square, dedicated to Vladimir Vysotsky

Saint Petersburg

- Temple of Love, Peace and Music, dedicated to John Lennon
- Kamchatka, house of Viktor Tsoi
- Museum of the Alexandrinsky Theatre
- St.Petersburg State Museum of Theatre and Music
- House and Museum of Feodor Chaliapin
- The Museum of Music and Music Instruments at the Count Sheremetev Palace
- Rimsky-Korsakov Apartment and Museum, dedicated to Nikolai Rimsky-Korsakov
- The Samoilov Actors' Family Museum, dedicated to Vasily Samoylov
- The Sound Museum

Other museums

- Museum of Sergei Taneyev, dedicated to Sergei Taneyev – Dyudkovo, Zvenigorod
- Museum Music and Time – Yaroslavl
- Tchaikovsky State House-Museum, dedicated to Pyotr Ilyich Tchaikovsky en Sergei Taneyev – Klin
- Rockmuseum – Ufa
- Ivanovka, former summer residence of Sergei Rachmaninoff – Tambov
- Novgorod Center for Music Antiquities – Veliky Novgorod
- Musical Instrument Museum – Volgograd
- Tsjaikovski Museum, dedicated to Pyotr Ilyich Tchaikovsky – Votkinsk

== Slovakia ==
- Slovak National Museum – Bratislava
- Guitar museum – Sobrance

== Slovenia ==
- Birth House of Hugo Wolf – Ljubljana
- The Rolling Stones Museum, dedicated to The Rolling Stones – Portorož

== South Africa ==
- Music of the Caab Centre – Franschhoek
- Adler Museum of the History of Music – Johannesburg

== South Korea ==
- Ureuk Museum, course of music in Gaya and Silla – Goryeong, North Gyeongsang Province
- Museum of Musical Instruments of the World (MMIW) – Paju
- Hybe Insight, artist museum – Seoul
- Korean Folk Village – Yongin

== Spain ==
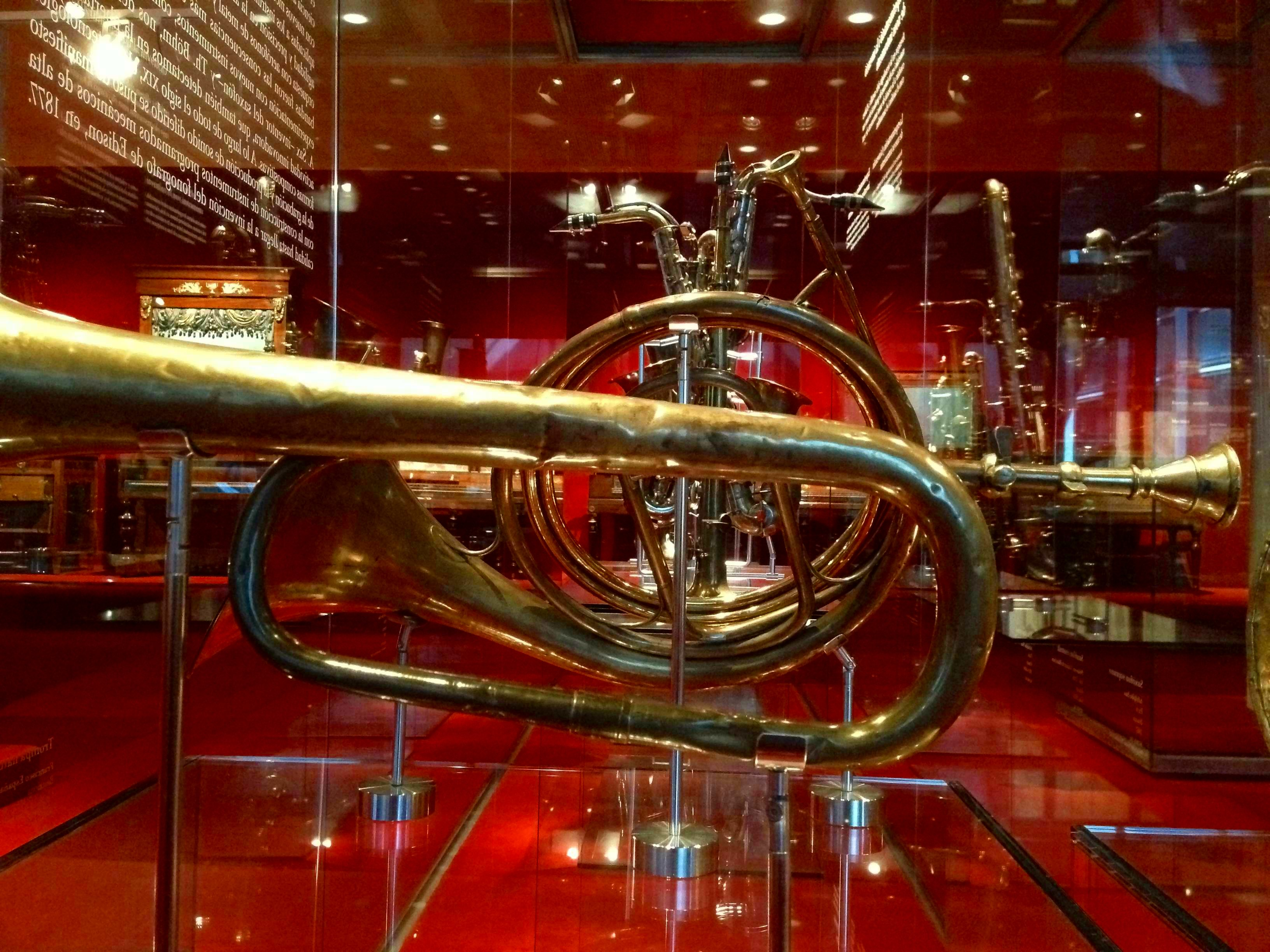
Museu de la Música de Barcelona

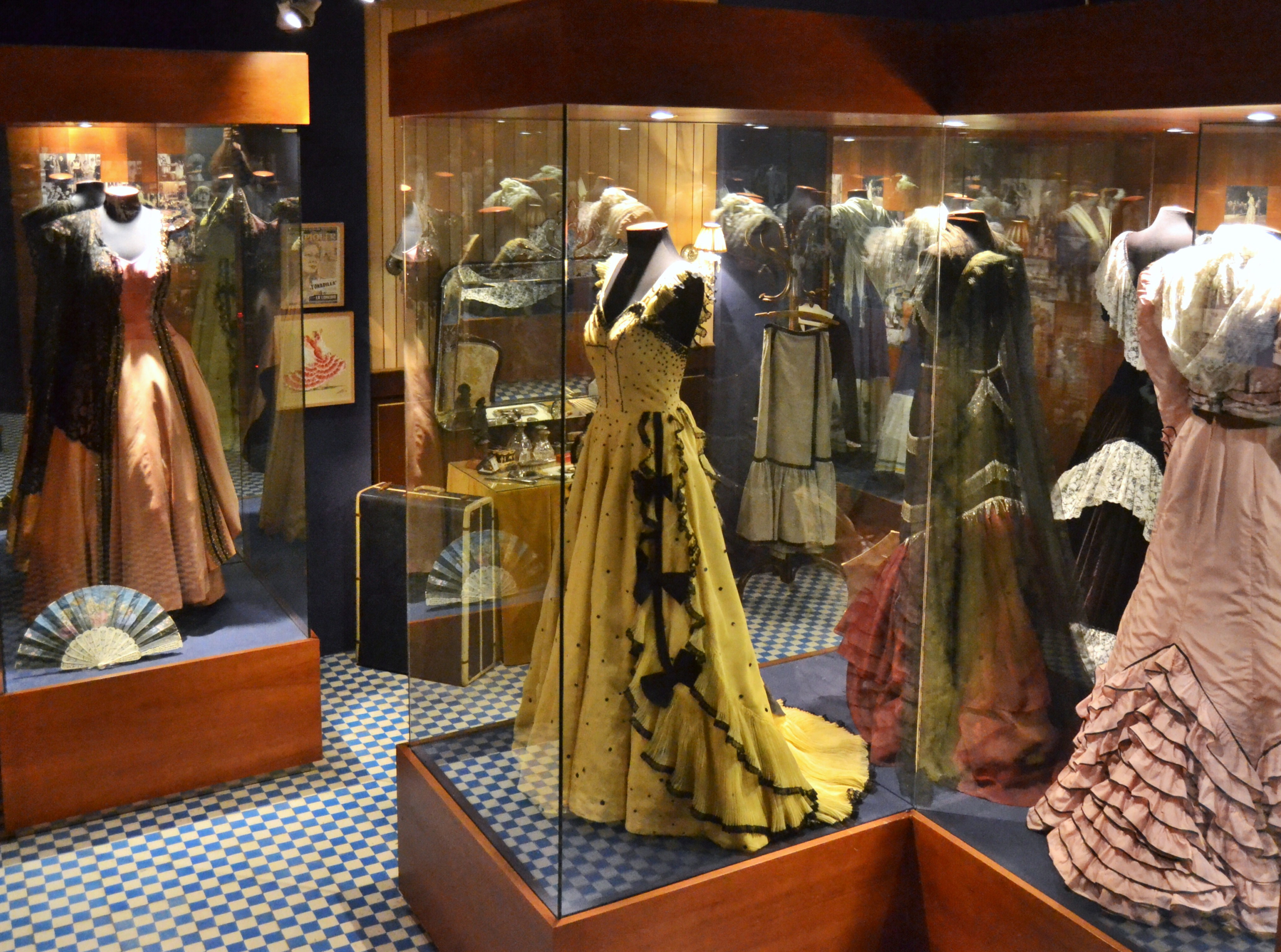
House-Museum of Concha Piquer

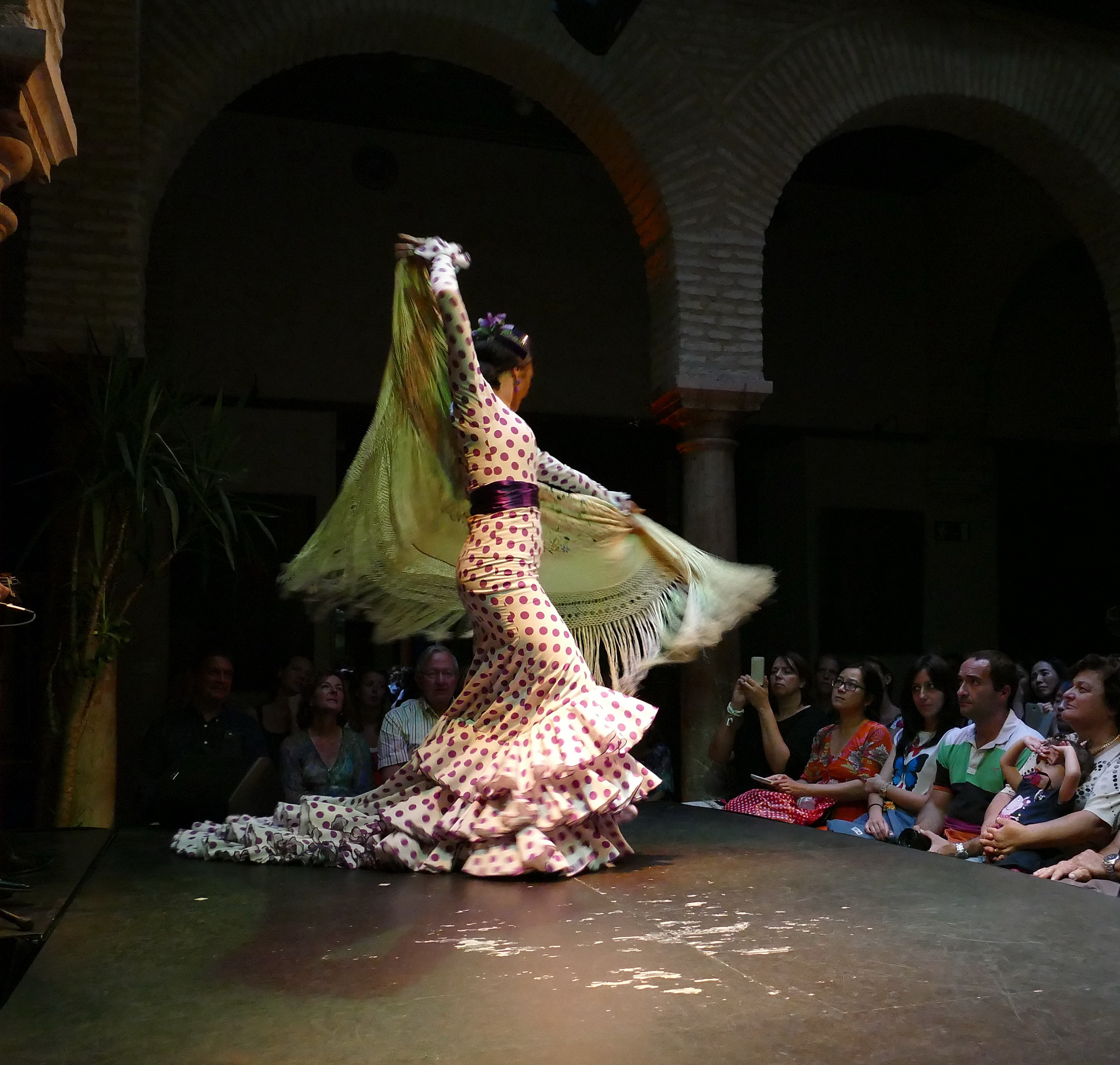
Museo del Baile Flamenco

North coast

- Alfercam Museum, ethnic musical instruments – Avilés, Asturias
- Casa Museo Jesús de Monasterio, de dedicated to Jesús de Monasterio – Cabezón de la Sal, Cantabria
- International Bagpipe Museum – Gijón
- Soinuenea–Herri Musikaren Txokoa, Basque music – Oiartzun, Basque Country

North-east

- Museo del Órgano, dedicated to organs – Agüero, Aragon
- Museo Nino Bravo, dedicated to Nino Bravo – Aielo de Malferit, Valencia
- Museu de la Música de Barcelona – Barcelona
- Rock Museum (2011–2012†) – Barcelona
- Museo de Música Étnica – Busot, Valencia
- Museu Isaac Albéniz, dedicated to Isaac Albéniz – Camprodon, Catalonia
- Museo Pablo Sarasate, dedicated to Pablo Sarasate – Pamplona, Navarra
- Casa-Museo Julián Gayarre, dedicated to Julián Gayarre – Roncal, Navarra
- Museu Pau Casals, dedicated to Pablo Casals – el Vendrell, Catalonia
- House-Museum of Concha Piquer, dedicated to Concha Piquer – Valencia

South

- Museo de la Música Étnica, music cultures worldwide – Barranda, Murcia
- Casa Museo Manuel de Falla, dedicated to Manuel de Falla – Granada
- Casa Museo Andrés Segovia, dedicated to Andrés Segovia – Linares, Jaén
- Museo de Raphael, dedicated to Raphael – Linares, Jaén
- Interactive musical museum of Málaga – Málaga
- Museo del Baile Flamenco, dedicated to flamenco – Sevilla
- Museo de la Guitarra – Almeria

Central

- Museo Jacinto Guerrero, dedicated to Jacinto Guerrero – Ajofrín, Toledo
- Museo de Sonidos del Mundo / Museo de Instrumentos – Santo Domingo de Silos, Burgos
- Museo Sara Montiel, dedicated to Sara Montiel – Campo de Criptana, Ciudad Real
- Casa Museo José Padilla, dedicated to José Padilla Sánchez – Madrid
- Fundación Victoria y Joaquín Rodrigo, dedicated to Victoria and Joaquín Rodrigo – Madrid
- Museo Hazen, piano collection – Las Rozas de Madrid, Madrid
- Museo de la Música. Colección Luis Delgado – Urueña, Valladolid

Other

- Valldemossa Charterhouse, living of Frédéric Chopin – Valldemossa, Mallorca
- Casa–Museo del Timple, local string instruments (timples) – Teguise, Lanzarote

== Suriname ==
- Kaseko Museum, dedicated to kaseko music – Paramaribo

== Sweden ==
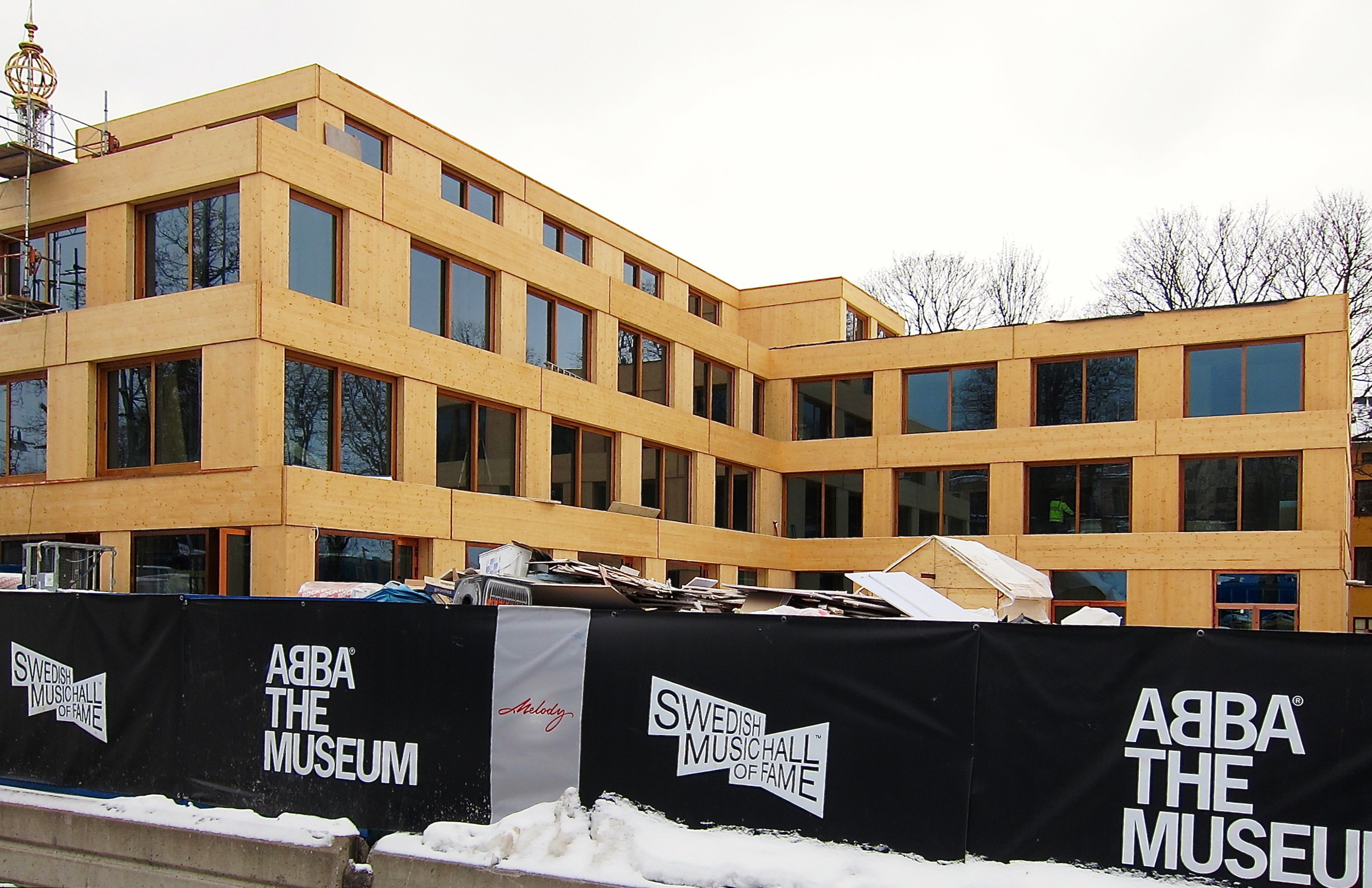
ABBA The Museum

Stockholm

- ABBA The Museum, dedicated to ABBA
- Swedish Music Hall of Fame
- Stockholm Music Museum (1901–2010†)
- Swedish Museum of Performing Arts
- Avicii Experience, dedicated to Tim "Avicii" Bergling

Other museums

- Jussi Björlingmuseum, dedicated to Jussi Björling – Borlänge
- Smetana Room, dedicated to Bedřich Smetana – Gothenburg
- Evert Taubes World (2008–2016†), dedicated to Evert Taube – Göteborg
- Jazzens museum, museum on jazz – Strömsholm
- Guitars – the Museum – Umeå
- Birgit Nilsson Museum, dedicated to Birgit Nilsson – Båstad
- Zarah Leander-museet, dedicated to Zarah Leander – Vikbolandet

== Switzerland ==
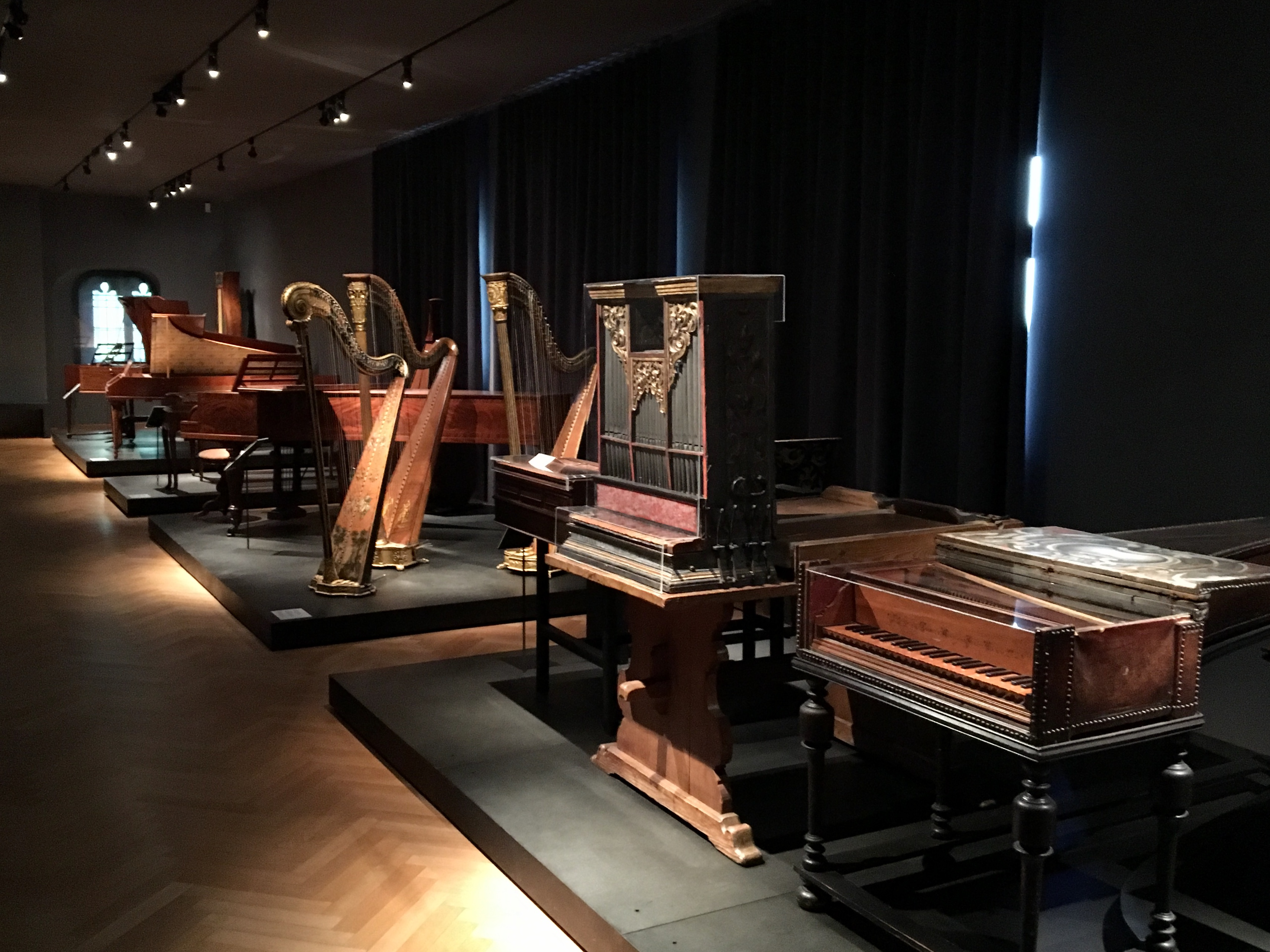
Music Museum, Basel

- Music Museum – Basel
- Salon des Pianos – Basel
- Musée Baud, named after instrument builders Frédy, Robert and Auguste Baud – L'Auberson
- Organ and Harmonium Museum – Liestal
- Queen: The Studio Experience, dedicated to Queen – Montreux
- Museum of Timekeeping and Mechanical Musical Instruments – Oberhofen am Thunersee
- Musée suisse de l'Orgue – Roche
- Musée d'automates et de boîtes à musique – Sainte-Croix
- Museum for Musical Automates – Seewen
- Richard Wagner Museum, Lucerne, dedicated to Richard Wagner – Tribschen
- SwissJazzOrama, jazz museum – Uster

== Taiwan ==
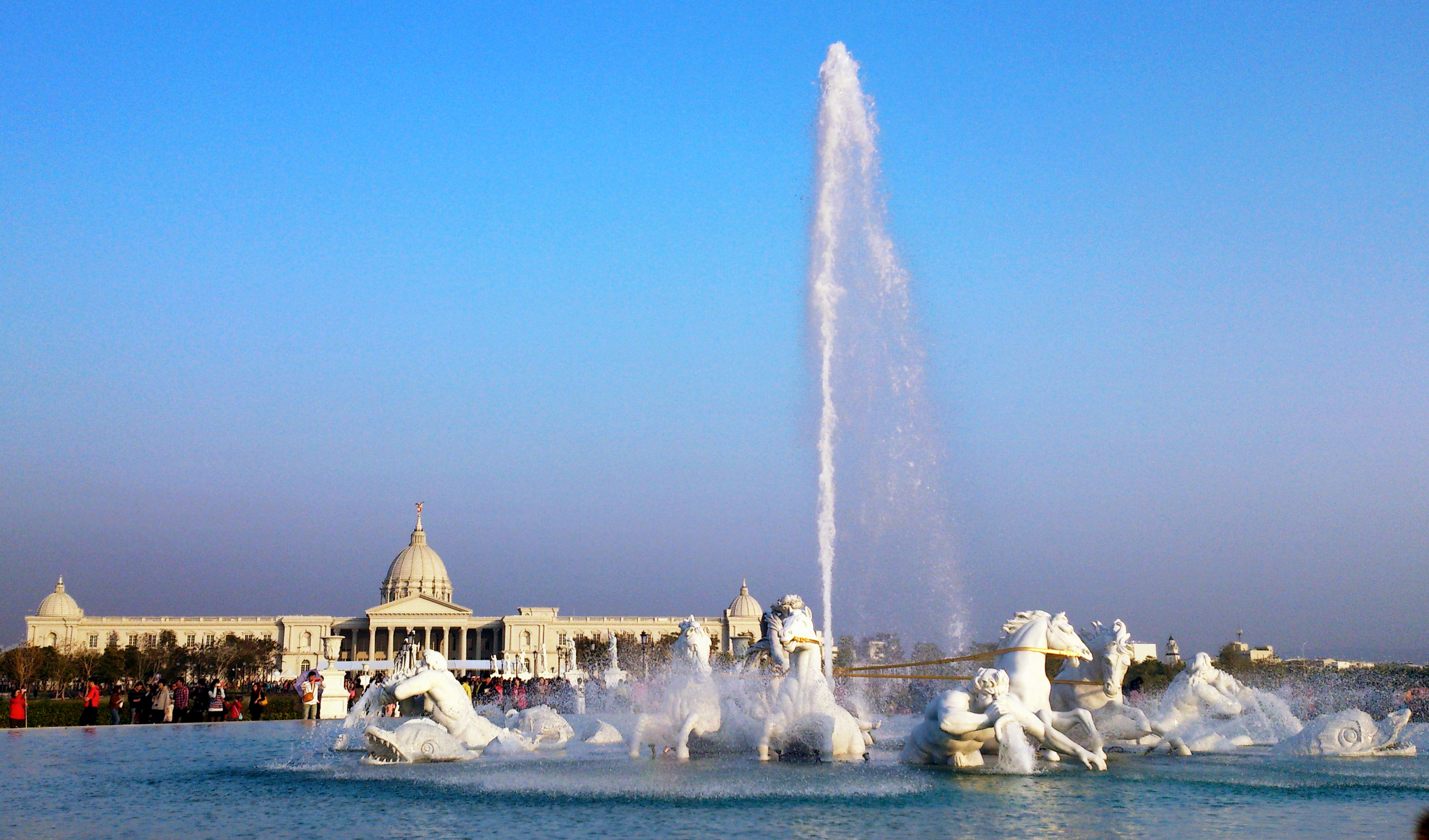
Chimei Museum

- Chang Lien-cheng Saxophone Museum – Houli, Taichung
- Chimei Museum, musical collection – Tainan

== Tajikistan ==
- Gurminj Museum of Musical Instruments – Dushanbe

== Tunisia ==
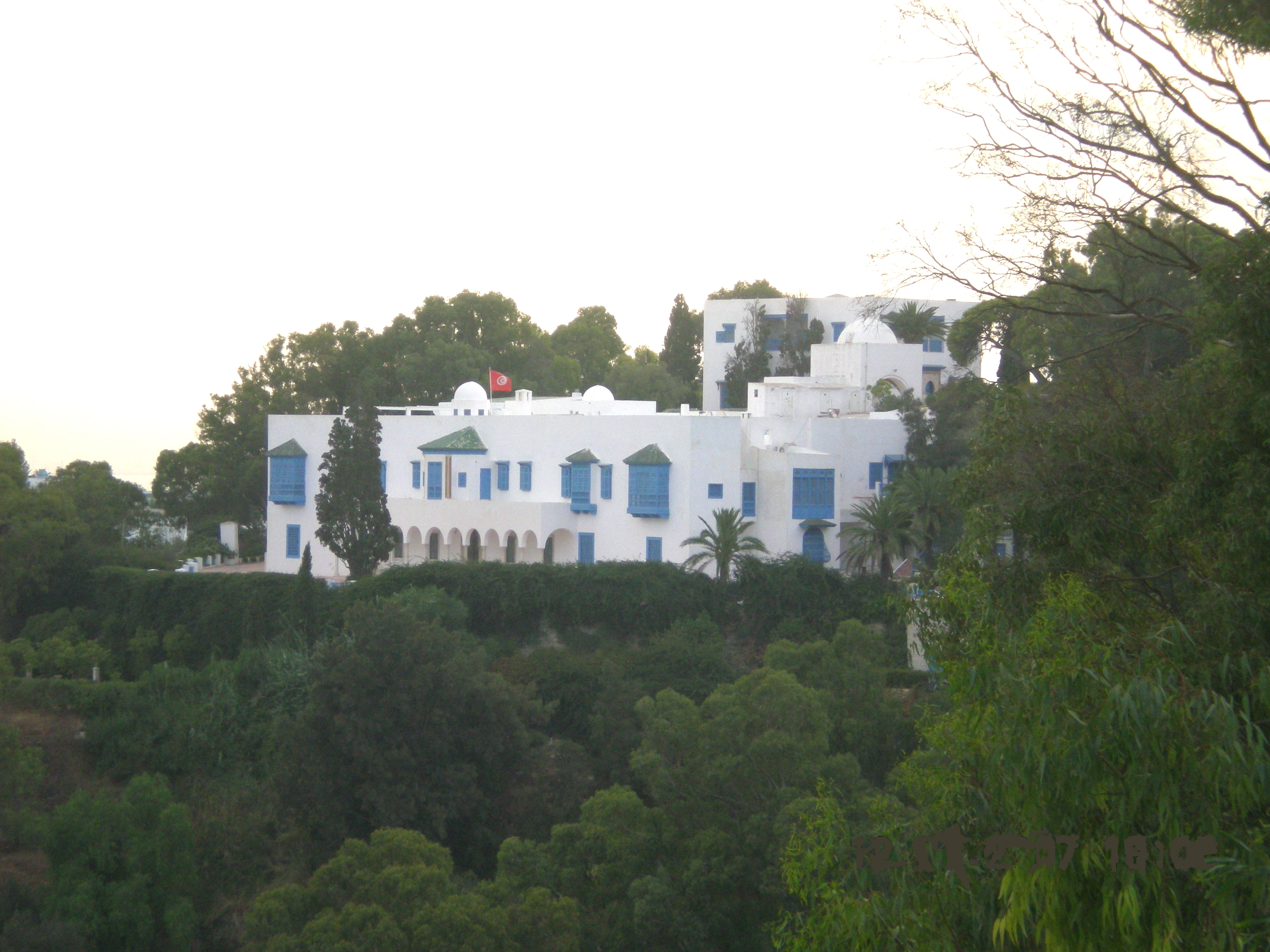
Ennejma Ezzahra Palace

- Centre des Musiques Arabes et Méditerranéennes, Ennejma Ezzahra Palace – Sidi Bou Said

== Turkey ==
- Aynalıkavak Palace, collection of musical instruments – Istanbul
- Barış Manço House Museum – Istanbul

== Ukraine ==
- Victor Kosenko Museum, dedicated to Viktor Kosenko – Kyiv

== United Kingdom ==
London

- Museum of Asian Music – Acton
- Musical Museum – Kew Bridge, Brentford
- Foundling Museum – Bloomsbury
- Horniman Museum, named after Frederick John Horniman – Forest Hill
- Fenton House – Hampstead
- Royal College of Music Museum – Royal College of Music, Kensington
- Royal Academy of Music Museum – Royal Academy of Music, Marylebone Road
- Handel & Hendrix in London, dedicated to George Frideric Handel and Jimi Hendrix – Mayfair
- Eel Pie Island Museum – Twickenham, Richmond upon Thames
- Museum of Army Music – Kneller Hall, Whitton, Richmond upon Thames

Liverpool

- British Music Experience – Greenwich (2009-2014), Liverpool (2015-present)
- Cavern Mecca (1981–1984†), dedicated to The Beatles
- The Beatles Story, dedicated to The Beatles
- Liverpool Wall of Fame
- 251 Menlove Avenue, paternal home of John Lennon
- 20 Forthlin Road, birth house Paul McCartney
- Liverpool Beatles Museum, created by Roag Best
- Strawberry Field, dedicated to John Lennon

Rest of England

- St. Albans Organ Museum – St Albans
- Herschel Museum of Astronomy, musical exhibition, named after William and Caroline Herschel – Bath
- Holburne Museum – Bath
- Royal Birmingham Conservatoire – Birmingham
- Brighton Museum & Art Gallery, musical instruments – Brighton
- Bristol City Museum and Art Gallery, musical instruments – Bristol
- Museum of Archaeology and Anthropology, University of Cambridge – Cambridge
- Holst Victorian House, birthplace of Gustav Holst – Cheltenham
- Coventry Music Museum, The 2-Tone Village – Coventry
- Warwick Arts Centre, musical collection – University of Warwick, Coventry
- Leith Hill Place, former home of Ralph Vaughan Williams and National Trust property – Dorking, Surrey
- Mechanical Museum and Doll Collection – Chichester
- Paul Corins Magnificent Music Machines (1967–2013†) – Liskerad, Cornwall
- Mechanical Music Museum – Cotton
- Hatchlands Park, The Cobbe Collection, keyboard instruments – East Clandon
- Tullie House Museum and Art Gallery, musical instruments – Cumbria
- Finchcocks, historical keyboard instruments (1971–2016†) – Goudhurst partly moved to Sevenoaks
- John Taylor & Co, collections bells – Loughborough
- Elgar Birthplace Museum, dedicated to Edward Elgar – Broadheath
- Morpeth Chantry Bagpipe Museum – Morpeth
- Keith Hardings World of Mechanical Music – Northleach
- Bate Collection of Musical Instruments – Oxford
- Ashmolean Museum, musical instruments – Oxford
- Pinchbeck, The Burtey Fen Collection, collection pipe organs – Pinchbeck
- Scarborough Fair Collection, collection mechanical organs – Scarborough
- National Centre for Popular Music (2009–2014†) – Sheffield
- American Museum in Britain – Somerset
- Museum of Somerset – Taunton
- Thursford Collection – Thursford
- Museum of Wigan Life – Wigan
- York Minster, musical instruments – York
- York Museums Trust, bells – York

Northern Ireland

- Nerve Centre – Derry

Scotland

- Music museum of the Reid Concert Hall – Edinburgh
- St Cecilia's Hall, musical instruments – Edinburgh
- Russell Collection, musical instruments – Edinburgh
- George Waterston Memorial Centre and Museum, dedicated to George Waterston – Fair Isle
- The Museum of Piping – Glasgow
- Dean Castle, collection of musical instruments – Kilmarnock
- Glenesk Folk Museum – Tarfside

Wales

- National Museum Cardiff, musical instruments – Cardiff
- Tŷ Siamas, national center for folkmusic – Dolgellau

== United States ==
See also: List of residences of American Musicians

Traveling (no fixed location)

- National Guitar Museum
- New Jersey Music Hall of Fame

Alabama

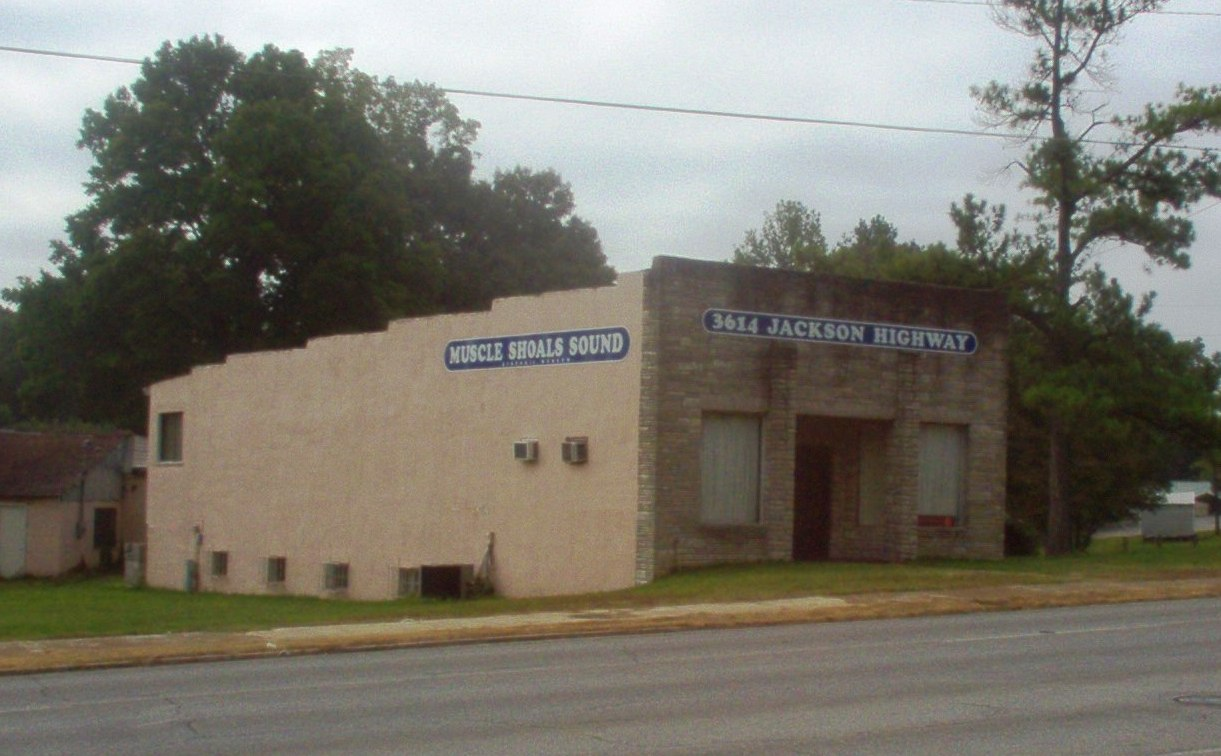
Muscle Shoals

- Alabama Jazz Hall of Fame – Birmingham
- W. C. Handy Home, Museum & Library, dedicated to W. C. Handy – Florence
- Hank Williams Boyhood Home & Museum, dedicated to Hank Williams – Georgiana
- The Hank Williams Museum, dedicated to Hank Williams – Montgomery
- Muscle Shoals Sound Studio Museum – Sheffield
- National Band Association Hall of Fame of Distinguished Band Conductors, Troy University – Troy
- Alabama Music Hall of Fame – Tuscumbia
- Commodore Museum, dedicated to the Commodores – Tuskegee

Arizona

- Musical Instrument Museum – Phoenix

Arkansas

- Johnny Cash Boyhood Home, dedicated to Johnny Cash – Dyess
- Delta Cultural Center – Helena
- Guitar Museum – Jacksonville
- Ozark Folk Center – Mountain View

California

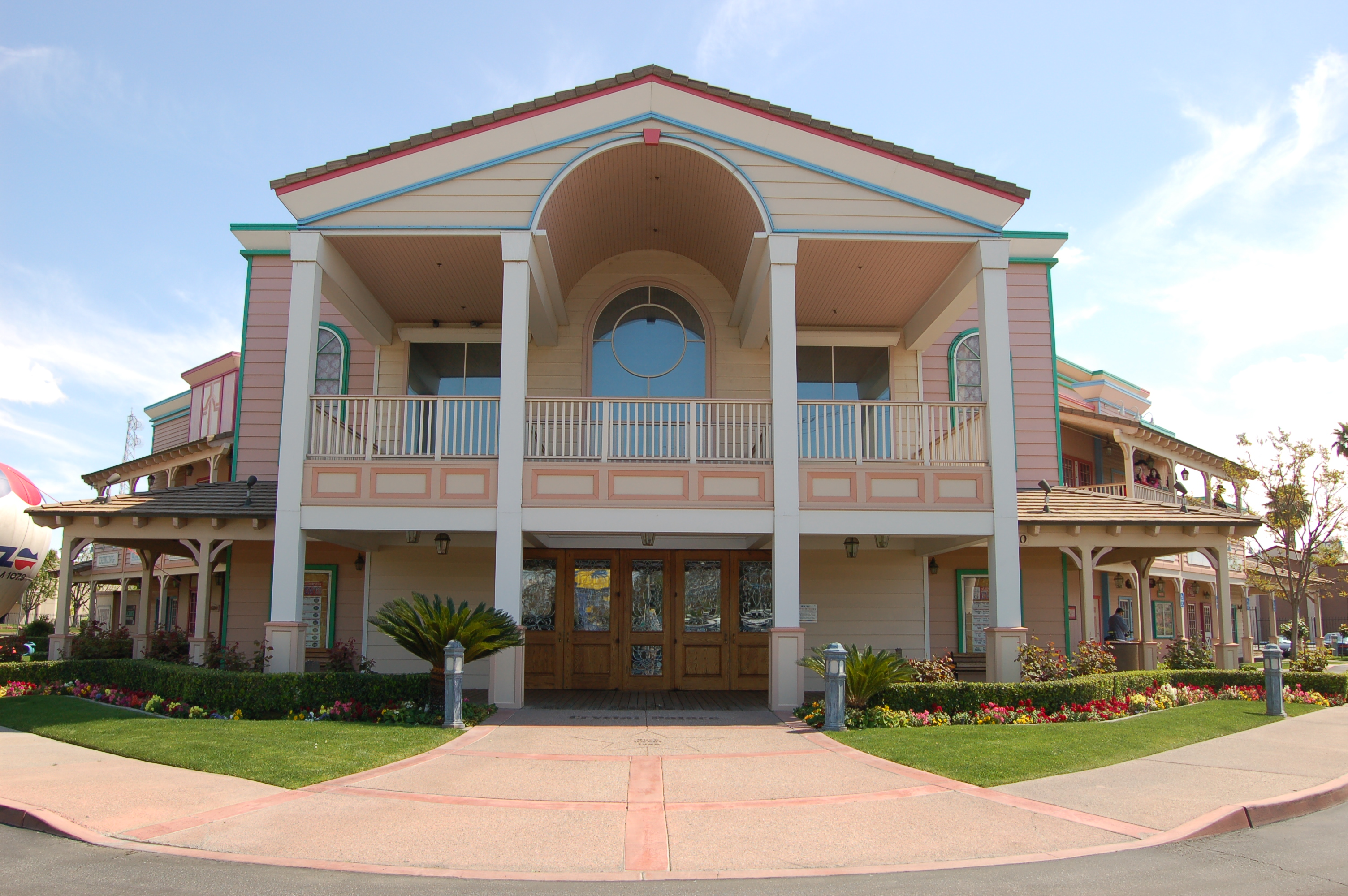
Crystal Palace

- Buck Owens Crystal Palace, dedicated to Buck Owens – Bakersfield
- Museum of Making Music – Carlsbad
- Grammy Museum at L.A. Live – Los Angeles
- Songwriters Hall of Fame – Los Angeles
- Sacramento Rock and Radio Museum – Sacramento
- Nethercutt Collection – Sylmar, San Fernando Valley
- Ira F. Brilliant Center for Beethoven Studies, dedicated to Ludwig van Beethoven – San Jose

Colorado

- Colorado Music Hall of Fame – Red Rocks Amphitheatre near Morrison

Connecticut

- Charles Ives House, dedicated to Charles Ives – Danbury
- Museum of Fife & Drum – Ivoryton
- Yale University Collection of Musical Instruments – New Haven

Florida

- Latin Music Hall of Fame Museum – Miami
- DownBeat Jazz Hall of Fame, Universal Studios' City Jazz – Orlando
- Florida Artists Hall of Fame, Florida State Capitol – Tallahassee
- Stephen Foster Folk Culture Center State Park, dedicated to Stephen Foster – White Springs

Georgia

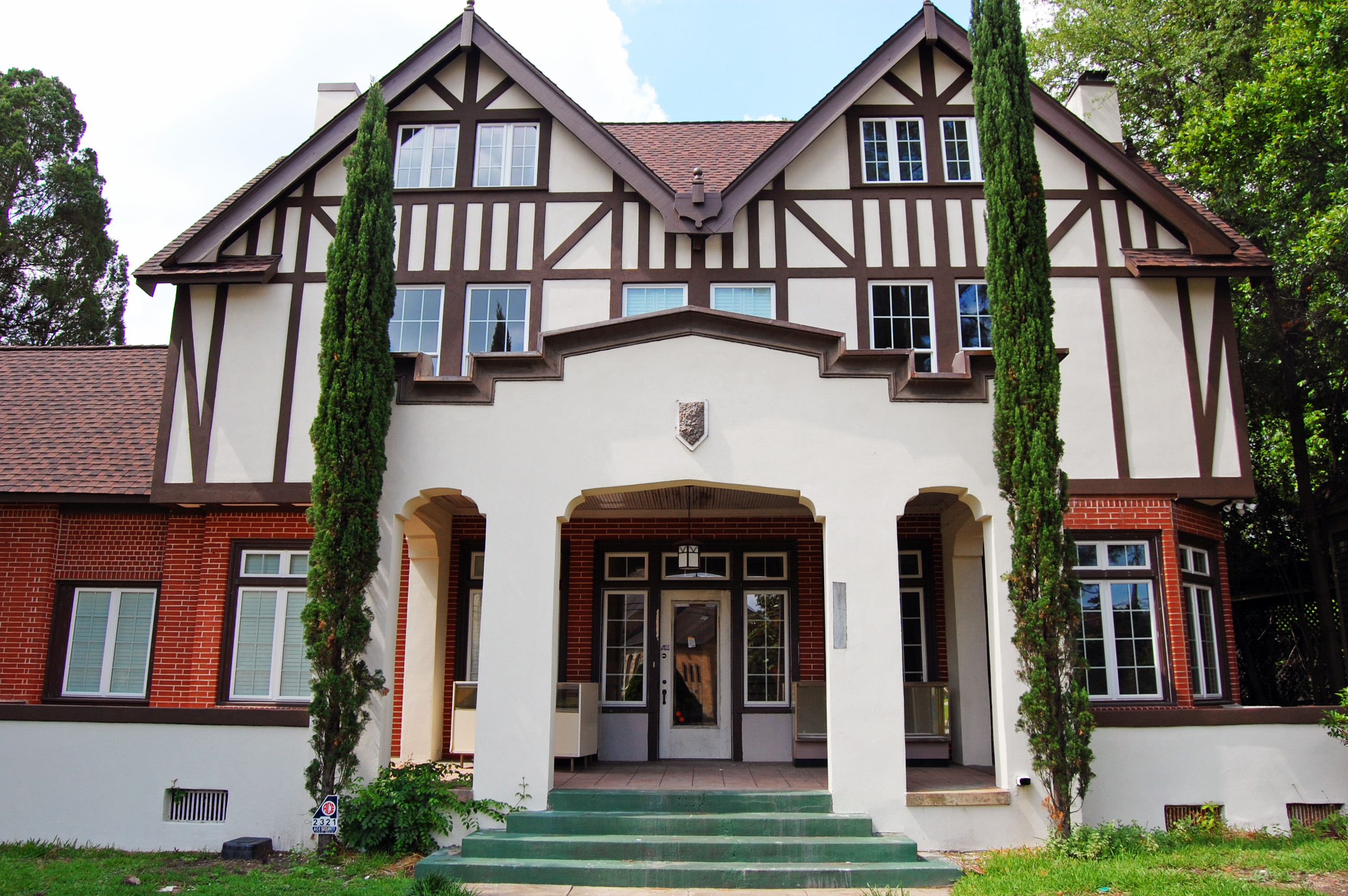
Allman Brothers Museum

- Atlanta Country Music Hall of Fame – Atlanta
- Trap Music Museum, dedicated to rapper T.I. – Atlanta
- Georgia Music Hall of Fame – Macon
- The Allman Brothers Band Museum, dedicated to The Allman Brothers Band – Macon
- The Little Richard House and Museum, dedicated to Little Richard – Macon

Illinois

- Chess Records - Chicago
- Place de la Musique – Barrington Hills
- Rock N Roll McDonald's (1983–2017†) – Chicago
- Illinois Rock & Roll Museum on Rt. 66 – Joliet
- David Adler Music and Arts Center – Libertyville
- Sousa Archives and Center for American Music – Urbana

Indiana

- Dr. Ted's Musical Marvels, named after Ted Waflart – Huntingburg
- Great American Songbook Foundation – Carmel
- Rhythm! Discovery Center – Indianapolis
- Zaharakos Ice Cream Parlor and Museum – Columbus

Iowa

- America's Old-Time Country Music Hall Of Fame – Anita
- Iowa Rock 'n' Roll Hall of Fame – Arnolds Park
- Glenn Miller Birthplace Museum, dedicated to Glenn Miller – Clarinda
- River Music Experience – Davenport
- Music Man Square, dedicated to Meredith Willson and his musical The Music Man – Mason City
- Bily Clocks Museum, partly dedicated to Antonín Dvořák – Spillville
- Surf Ballroom & Museum – Clear Lake

Kentucky

- Kentucky Music Hall of Fame – Mount Vernon
- International Bluegrass Music Hall of Fame – Owensboro
- U.S. 23 Country Music Highway Museum – Paintsville
- Francis M. Stafford House – Paintsville
- Bill Monroe Museum, dedicated to Bill Monroe – Rosine

Louisiana

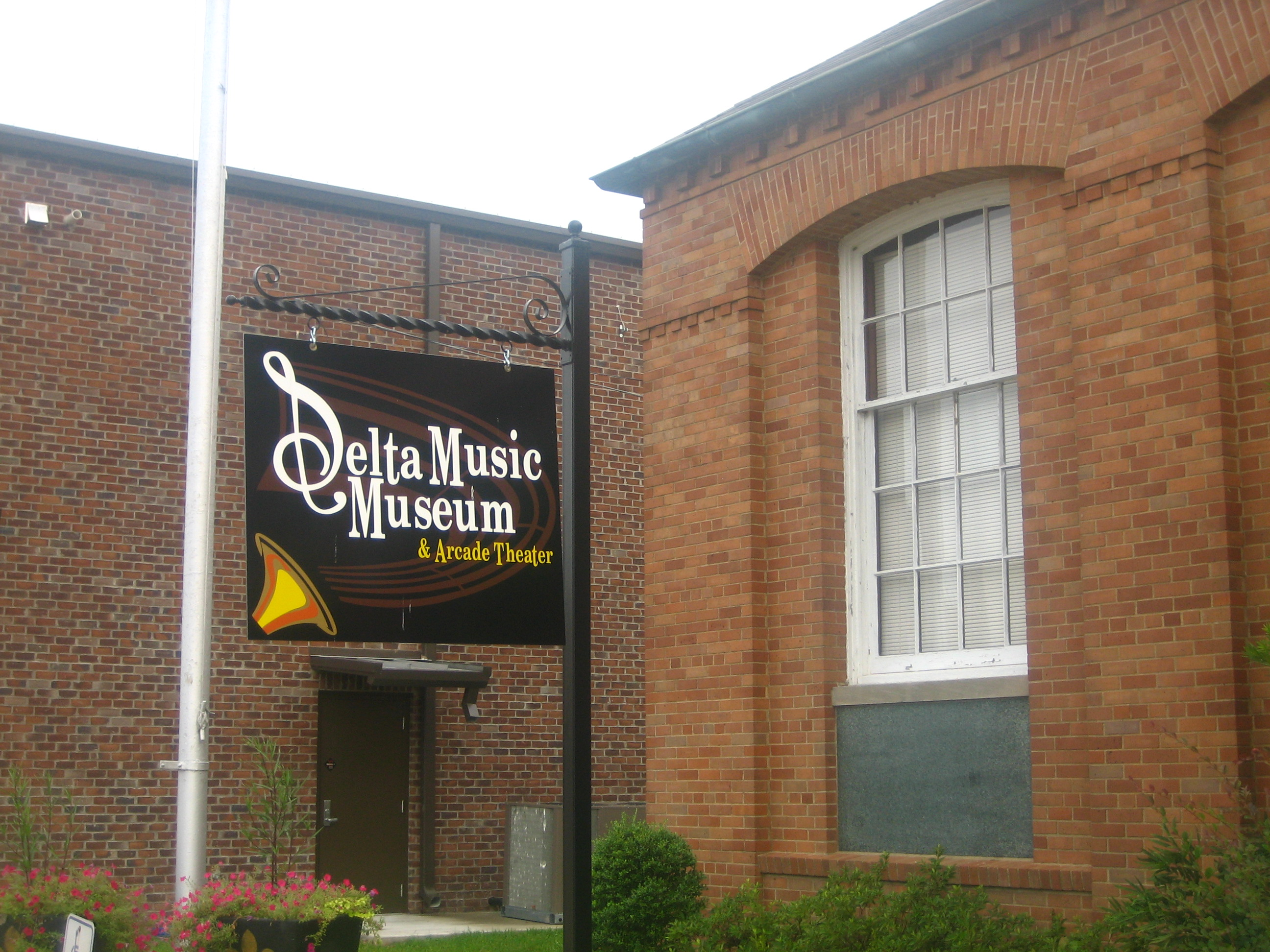
Delta Music Museum

- Louisiana Music Hall of Fame – Baton Rouge
- Cajun Music Hall of Fame, dedicated to Cajun music – Eunice
- Delta Music Museum – Ferriday
- Rebel State Historic Site – Marthaville
- New Orleans Mint (music collection went to Jazz Museum) – New Orleans
- New Orleans Jazz Museum – New Orleans

Maine

- Bryant Stove & Music Museum – Thorndike

Maryland

- Bagpipe Museum (1997–2005†) – Ellicott City
- Strathmore – North Bethesda

Massachusetts

- Frederick Historical Piano Collection – Ashburnham
- Museum of Fine Arts Boston, musical instruments collection – Boston

Michigan

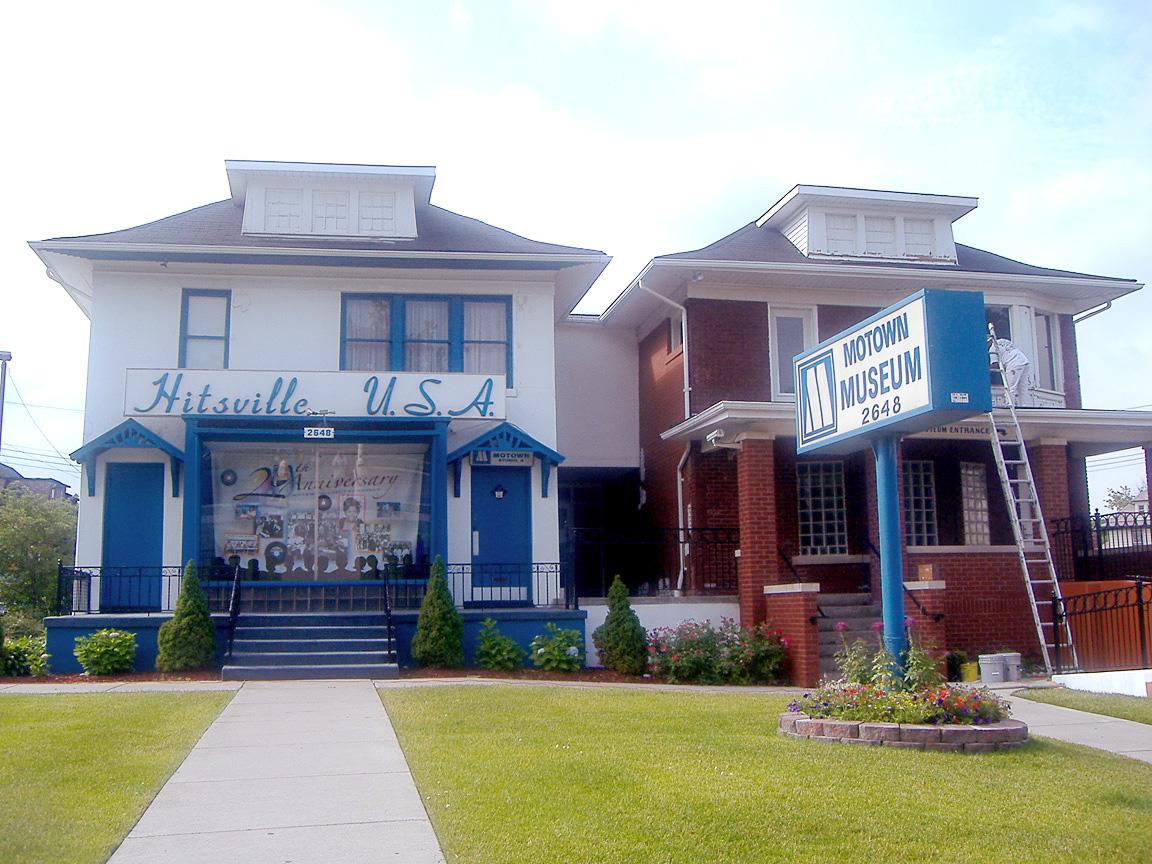
Motown Museum

- Music House Museum – Acme
- Stearns Collection of Musical Instruments – Ann Arbor
- Motown Museum – Detroit
- International Gospel Music Hall of Fame and Museum – Detroit
- Carnegie Center, Port Huron Museum, musical collection – Port Huron
- Tuba Museum, dedicated to the tuba – Okemos

Minnesota

- Minnesota Music Hall of Fame – New Ulm
- Paisley Park Studios, dedicated to Prince – Chanhassen
- Schubert Club, named after Franz Schubert – Saint Paul

Mississippi

- Mississippi John Hurt Museum, dedicated to Mississippi John Hurt – Carrollton
- Delta Blues Museum – Clarksdale
- Rock & Blues Museum – Clarksdale
- The Grammy Museum Mississippi – Cleveland
- Greenwood Blues Heritage Museum & Gallery – Greenwood
- Robert Johnson Blues Museum, dedicated to Robert Johnson – Crystal Springs
- Mississippi Music Museum – Hazlehurst
- Graceland Too (1990–2014†) – Holly Springs
- B.B. King Museum and Delta Interpretive Center, dedicated to B.B. King – Indianola
- Mississippi Musicians Hall of Fame – Jackson
- Highway 61 Blues Museum – Leland
- Rhythm and Blues Music Hall of Fame (planned) – Marks
- Hartley Peavey Visitor Center, dedicated to Peavey – Meridian
- Highland Park, dedicated to Jimmie Rodgers – Meridian
- Charles H. Templeton Sr. Music Museum, musical collection – Starkville
- Gateway to the Blues Visitors Center and Museum – Tunica
- Elvis Presley Birthplace, dedicated to Elvis Presley – Tupelo
- Howlin' Wolf Museum, dedicated to Howlin' Wolf – West Point

Missouri

- Country Gospel Music Hall of Fame – Branson
- American Jazz Museum – Kansas City
- National Blues Museum – St. Louis
- Scott Joplin House State Historic Site, dedicated to Scott Joplin – St. Louis
- Steel Guitar Hall of Fame – St. Louis

Nebraska

- Omaha Black Music Hall of Fame – Omaha

Nevada

- Liberace Museum Collection – Paradise
- Elvis-A-Rama Museum (1999–2006†) – dedicated to Elvis Presley, Paradise
- The King's Ransom Museum, dedicated to Elvis Presley – Las Vegas
- The Punk Rock Museum – Las Vegas

New Jersey

- Bruce Springsteen Center for American Music – Long Branch
- Morris Museum – Morristown
- Grammy Museum Experience – Newark

New York

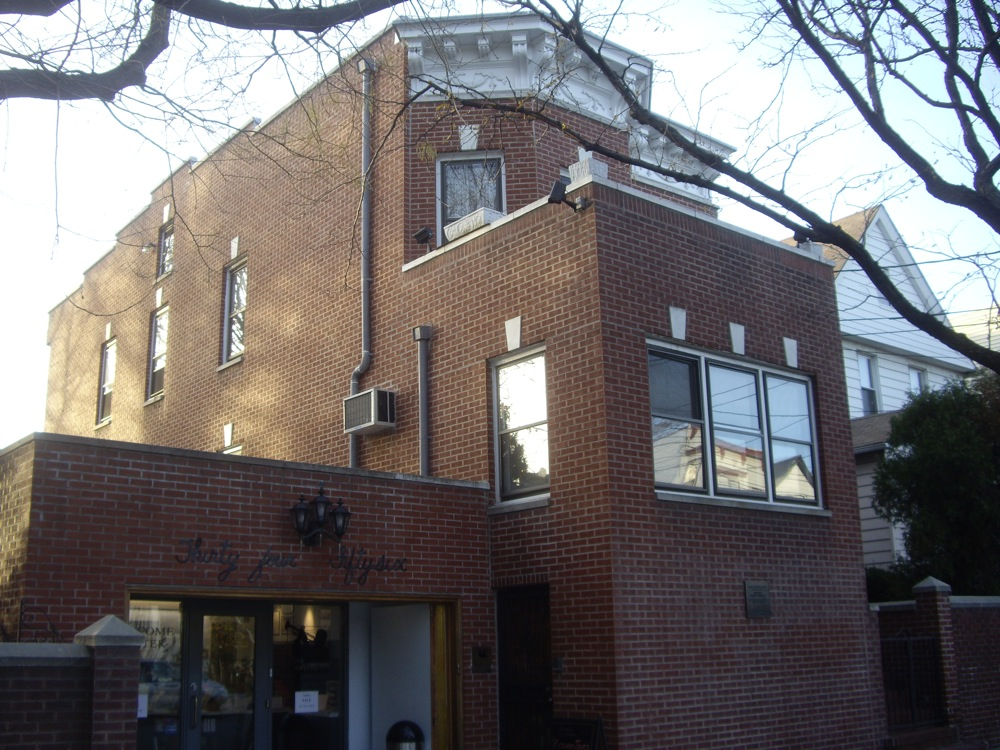
Louis Armstrong House

New York City and Long Island

- Universal Hip Hop Museum – The Bronx
- Brooklyn Jazz Hall of Fame and Museum – Brooklyn
- National Jazz Museum – Harlem
- Hip Hop Hall of Fame – Harlem
- Long Island Music Hall of Fame – Melville, Huntington
- Metropolitan Museum of Art, circa 5,000 instruments – Manhattan
- New York Jazz Museum – Manhattan
- ARChive of Contemporary Music – Manhattan
- Rose Museum, memorial of the debut of the Vienna Philharmonic – Carnegie Hall, Manhattan
- Strawberry Fields, dedicated to John Lennon – Central Park, Manhattan
- Louis Armstrong House Museum, dedicated to Louis Armstrong – Queens

Other museums

- Bethel Woods Center for the Arts – Bethel (Woodstock site)
- Marcella Sembrich Opera Museum, dedicated to Marcella Sembrich – Bolton Landing, Warren County
- New York State Country Music Hall of Fame – Cortland
- Original American Kazoo Factory and Museum, dedicated the kazoo – Eden
- Fiddler's Hall of Fame and Museum, dedicated to fiddlers – Redfield
- Empire State Theater Musical Instrument Museum – Syracuse

North Carolina

- Curb Museum for Music and Motorsports – Kannapolis
- North Carolina Music Hall of Fame – Kannapolis
- Earl Scruggs Center, Cleveland County Courthouse, dedicated to Earl Scruggs – Shelby

North Dakota

- Ray Opera House Museum – Ray

Ohio

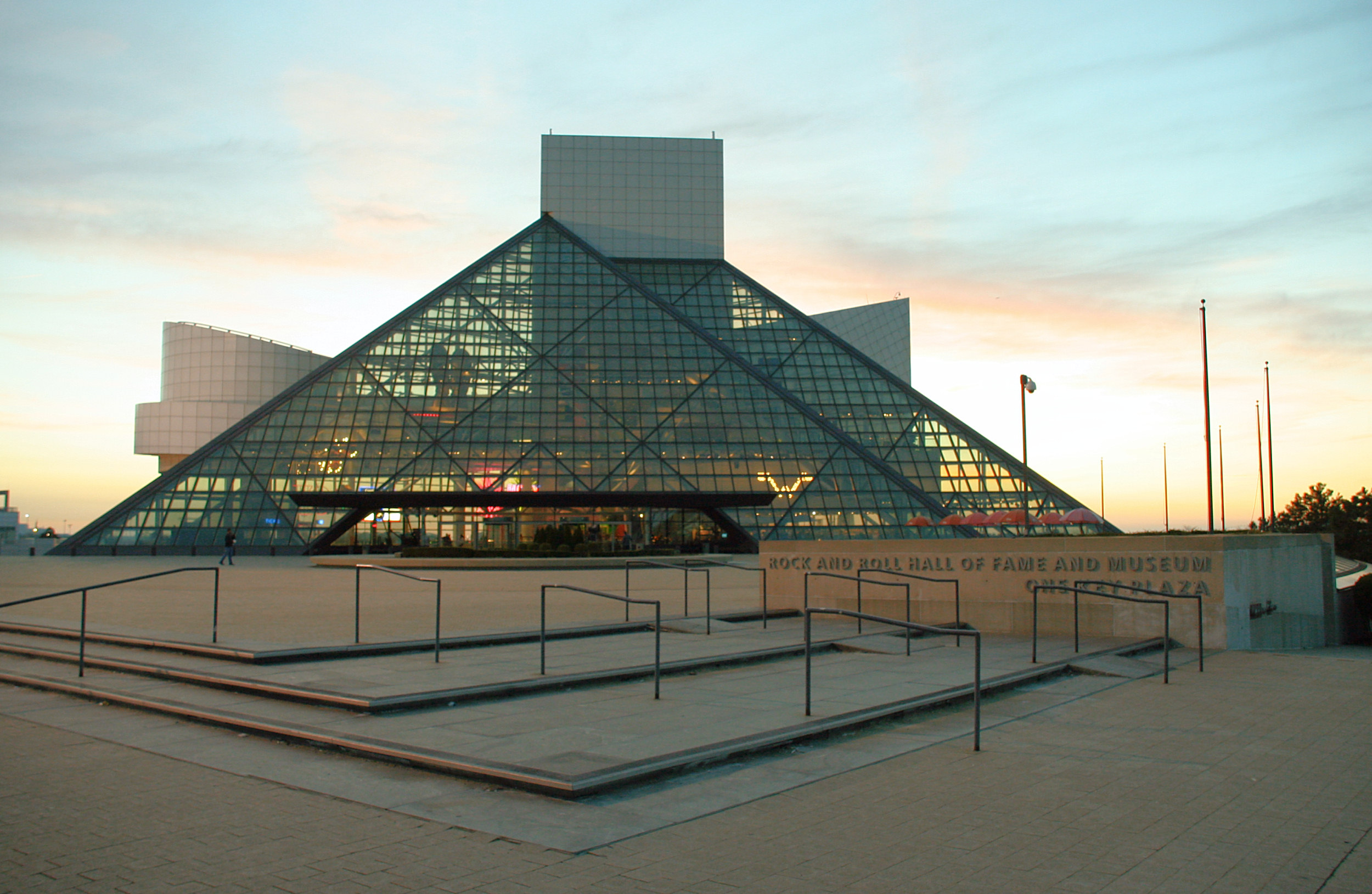
Rock and Roll Hall of Fame

- Ted Lewis Museum, dedicated to Ted Lewis – Circleville
- American Classical Music Hall of Fame and Museum – Cincinnati
- Verdin Bell and Clock Museum – Cincinnati
- Rock and Roll Hall of Fame – Cleveland
- Polka Hall of Fame – Euclid

Oklahoma

- Roger Miller Museum, dedicated to Roger Miller – Erick
- Oklahoma Music Hall of Fame – Muskogee
- American Banjo Museum – Oklahoma City
- Washington Irving Trail Museum, country music collection, named after Washington Irving – Ripley
- Oklahoma Jazz Hall of Fame – Tulsa
- Bob Dylan Center, dedicated to the archives of Bob Dylan – Tulsa
- Woody Guthrie Center, dedicated to Woody Guthrie and includes the archives of Phil Ochs – Tulsa

Oregon

- Schuman Instrument Collection – Southern Oregon University, Ashland

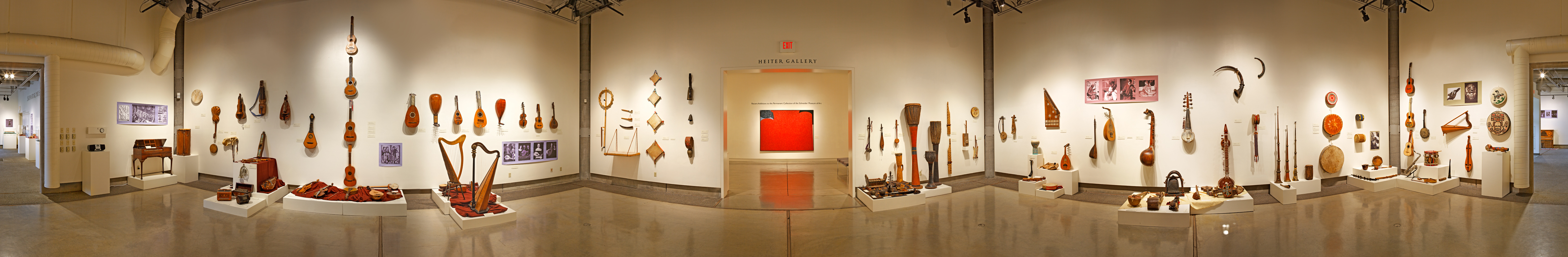
Part of the Schuman Instrument Collection of the Southern Oregon University

Pennsylvania

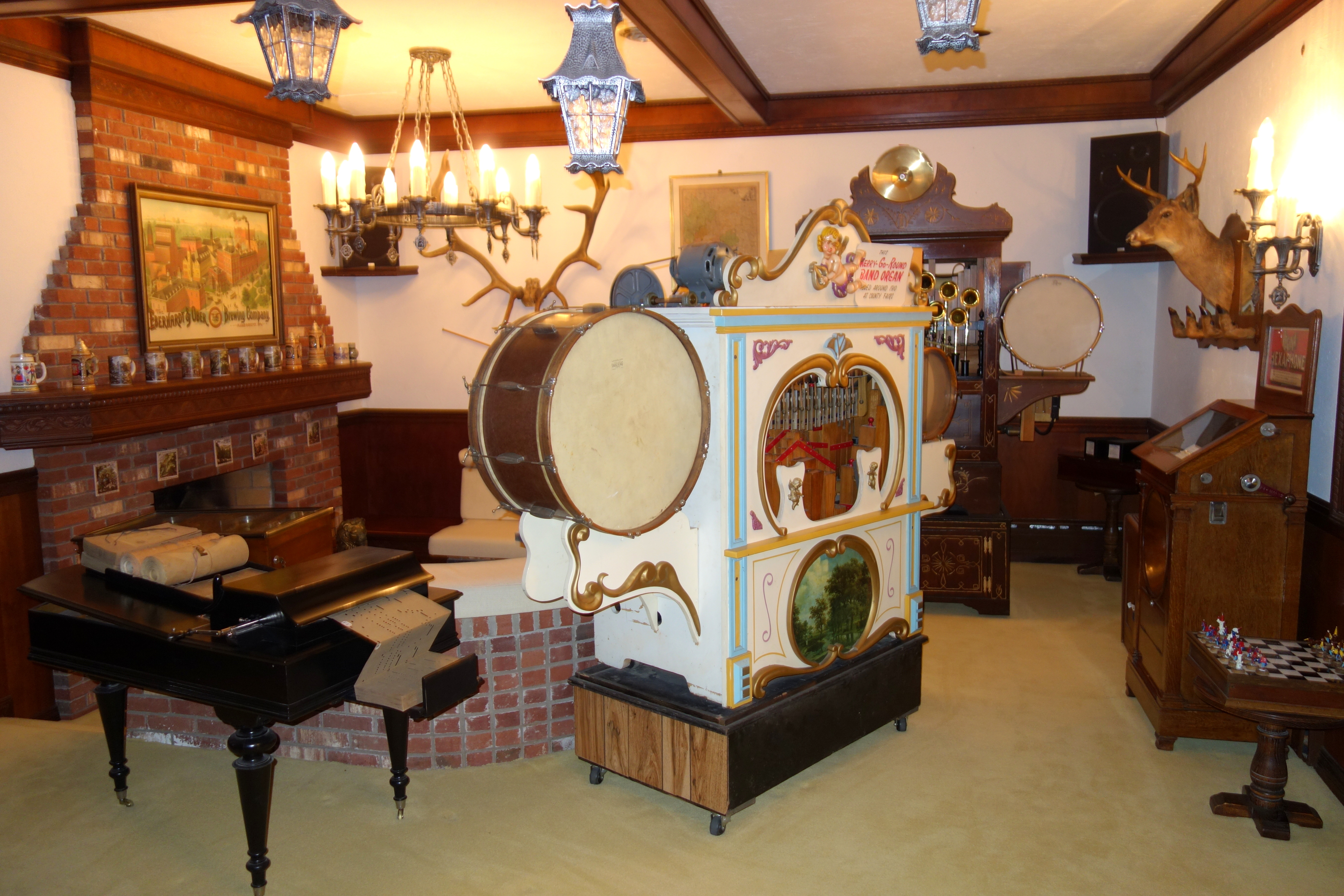
Bayernhof Music Museum

- Liberty Bell Museum (1962–2023†) – Allentown
- DeBence Antique Music World – Franklin
- Wolf Museum of Music and Art – Lancaster County
- American Treasure Tour – Oaks, Montgomery County
- Martin Guitar Museum, named after C. F. Martin & Company – Nazareth
- New Holland Band Museum – New Holland
- Bayernhof Music Museum – O'Hara Township
- Marian Anderson House, dedicated to Marian Anderson – Philadelphia
- Stephen Foster Memorial, dedicated to Stephen Foster – University of Pittsburgh, Pittsburgh
- Phillip Paul Bliss House, named after Philip Bliss – Rome
- Vocal Group Hall of Fame – Sharon

South Carolina

- The Kazoo Museum, dedicated to the kazoo – Beaufort
- Sigal Music Museum (formerly the Carolina Music Museum) – Heritage Green

South Dakota

- National Music Museum – Vermillion

Tennessee

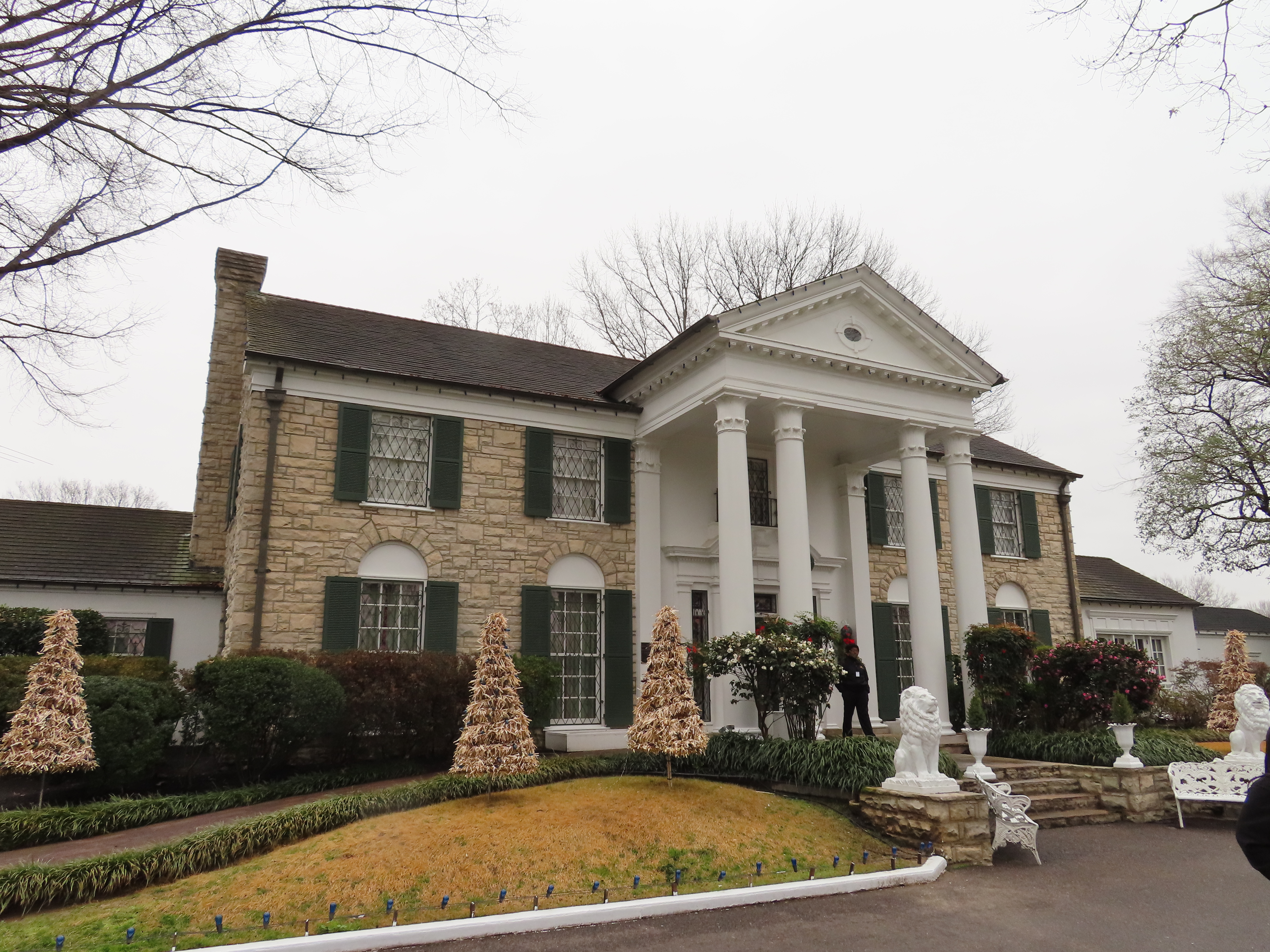
Graceland

- West Tennessee Delta Heritage Center, musical museum and dedication to Tina Turner – Brownsville
- Rockabilly Hall of Fame – Burns
- Southern Gospel Museum and Hall of Fame – Dollywood
- Chasing Rainbows Museum, dedicated to Dolly Parton – Dollywood
- House of Cash, (1970–2003†) dedicated to Johnny Cash – Hendersonville
- Loretta Lynn Ranch, dedicated to Loretta Lynn – Hurricane Mills
- International Rock-a-billy Hall of Fame – Jackson
- Mountain Music Museum – Kingsport
- James D. Vaughan Museum, dedicated to James David Vaughan – Lawrenceburg
- Graceland, dedicated to Elvis Presley – Memphis
- Blues Hall of Fame – Memphis
- Memphis Music Hall of Fame – Memphis
- Memphis Rock N' Soul Museum – Memphis
- W. C. Handy Museum, dedicated to W. C. Handy – Memphis
- Stax Museum of American Soul Music – Memphis
- Sun Studio – Memphis
- Johnny Cash Museum, dedicated to Johnny Cash – Nashville
- Patsy Cline Museum, dedicated to Patsy Cline – Nashville
- Willie Nelson and Friends Museum, dedicated to Willie Nelson – Nashville
- Country Music Hall of Fame and Museum – Nashville
- Gospel Music Hall of Fame – Nashville
- Musicians Hall of Fame and Museum – Nashville
- Nashville Songwriters Hall of Fame – Nashville
- National Museum of African American Music – Nashville
- Museum of Appalachia, Hall of Fame and permanent collection of Uncle Dave Macon – Norris
- Elvis & Hollywood Legends Museum, dedicated to Elvis Presley and others – Pigeon Forge

Texas

- Tejano Roots Museum, dedicated to Tejano music – Alice
- South Austin Museum of Popular Culture – Austin
- Texas Music Museum – Austin
- Texas Polka Music Museum – Austin
- Heart of Texas Country Music Museum – Brady
- Texas Country Music Hall of Fame – Carthage
- Western Music Association Hall of Fame – Coppell
- The Selena Museum, dedicated to Selena Quintanilla – Corpus Christi
- Lefty Frizzell Museum, dedicated to Lefty Frizzell – Corsicana
- Texas Musicians Museum – Hillsboro
- Jukebox Museum – Houston
- Texas Musicians Museum (?–2018†) – Irving
- Buddy Holly Center, dedicated to Buddy Holly and Texan music – Lubbock
- Blues & History Museum – Navasota
- Smitty's Juke Box Museum – Pharr
- Freddy Fender Museum, named after Freddy Fender – San Benito
- Texas Conjunto Music Museum – San Benito
- Sherman Jazz Museum – Sherman
- Bob Wills Museum, dedicated to Bob Wills – Turkey
- Roy Orbison Museum, dedicated to Roy Orbison – Wink

Utah

- Utah Cowboy and Western Heritage Museum – Ogden

Virginia

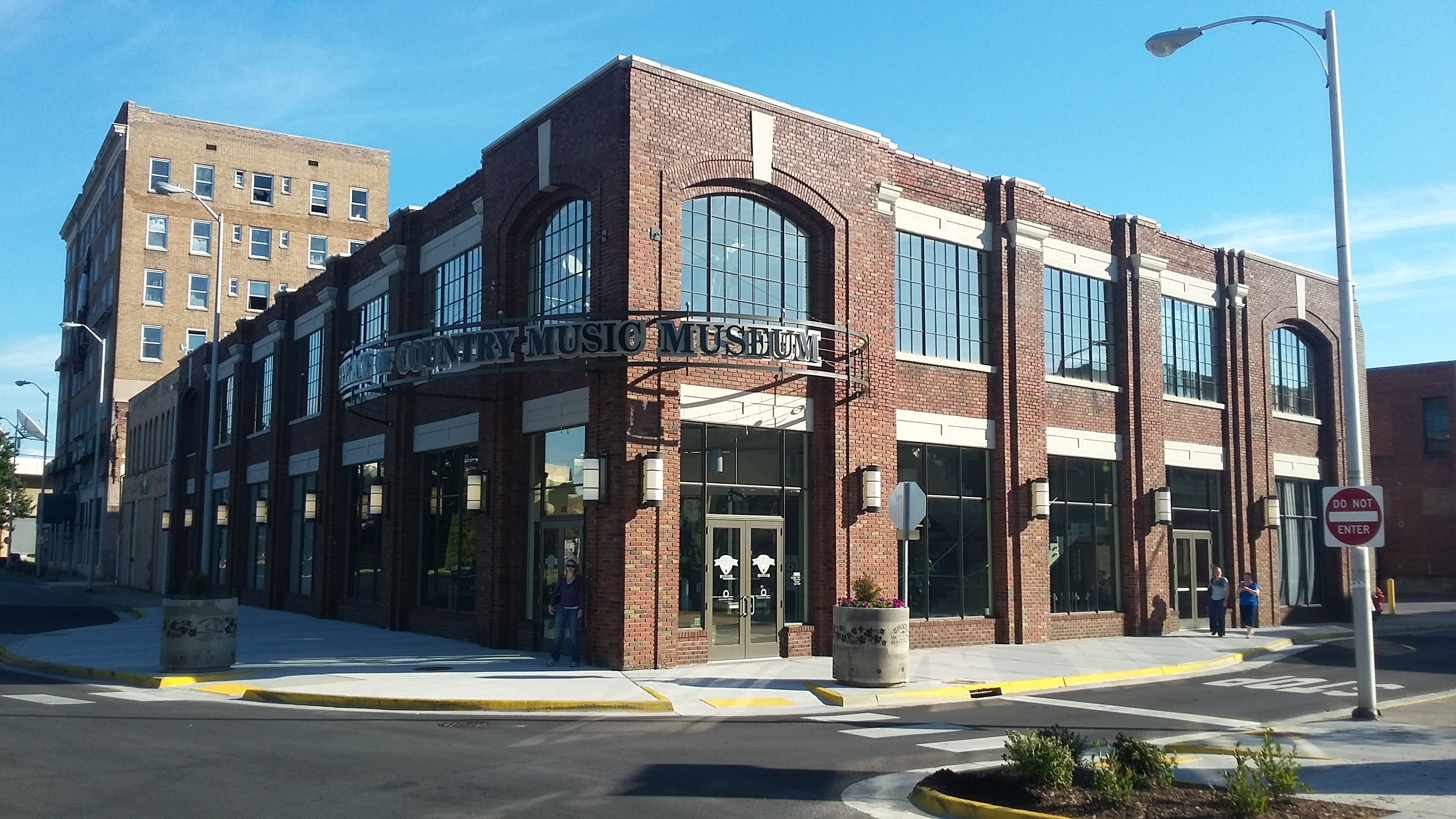
Birthplace of Country Music

- Birthplace of Country Music Museum – Bristol
- Ralph Stanley Museum, dedicated to Ralph Stanley – Clintwood
- Blue Ridge Institute & Museum, musical collection – Ferrum
- Blue Ridge Music Center – Galax
- Carter Family Fold, dedicated to the Carter Family – Hiltons, Scott County
- Virginia Musical Museum – Williamsburg

Washington

- Museum of Pop Culture, formerly Experience Music Project – Seattle

West Virginia

- West Virginia Music Hall of Fame – Charleston
- Gorby's Vintage Instrument Museum – South Charleston

Washington, D.C.

- O Street Museum Foundation

== Uzbekistan ==
- Memorial house museum of Tamara Khanum – Tashkent
