= List of museums in Hamburg =

List of museums in Hamburg

The city of Hamburg, Germany is home to several museums, galleries, and other related cultural institutions. 92 state and private museums are located in Hamburg proper as of 2024. This list contains the most famous or well-regarded organizations.

== Museums ==
Several foundations and organisations in Hamburg coordinate the events and exhibitions for most museums. Events like the Long Night of Museums (Lange Nacht der Museen) — during which the establishments remain open late into the night, seeking to introduce new individuals to the cultural institutions—are promoted by the Museumsdienst Hamburg. The ticket include only one fare for all museums and the public transport provided by the Hamburger Verkehrsverbund. In 2009, 42 museums and exhibition halls participated, with more than 600 events and exhibitions, and the cost was €12, reduced €8. More than 30,000 people attended.

=== Art ===
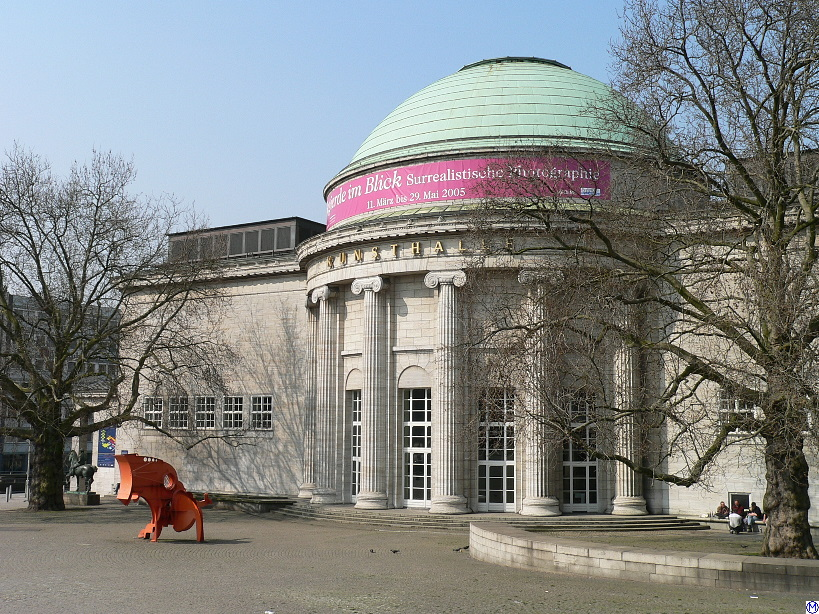
Art Gallery (Kunsthalle Hamburg)

Museum participates at the event Long Night of Museums.

German name	Translation	Date (Note: Creation or opening date. If two dates are given the first date is for a preceding organisation or institution.)	Location (Note: Borough or quarter in Hamburg proper (Street if article existing).)	Notes	Website
Kunsthalle Hamburg und Galerie der Gegenwart	Art Gallery and Gallery of Contemporary Arts		Altstadt		(in English)
Bucerius Kunst Forum			Altstadt		(in English)
Deichtorhallen; Haus der Photographie	House of Photography (and exhibition hall for contemporary art)		Altstadt		(in English)
Ernst-Barlach-Haus		1962	Othmarschen		(in English)
Erotic Art Museum	Erotic Art Museum			closed	
Jenisch-Haus; Museum für Kunst und Kultur an der Elbe			Othmarschen	(Note: Museum cooperates as Stiftung historische Museen Hamburg (Foundation of historical museums of Hamburg))	(in German)
Museum für Kunst und Gewerbe Hamburg	Museum of Art and Industry Hamburg	1874	Altstadt		(in English)

=== Music ===
Museum participates at the event Long Night of Museums.

German name	Translation	Date	Location	Notes	Website
Brahms Museum		1971			Composers Quarter Hamburg
Telemann Museum		1971			Composers Quarter Hamburg
Carl Philipp Emanuel Bach Museum		2011			Composers Quarter Hamburg
Johann Adolph Hasse Museum		2015			Composers Quarter Hamburg
Gustav Mahler Museum		2018			Composers Quarter Hamburg
Fanny & Felix Mendelssohn Museum		2018			Composers Quarter Hamburg
Beatlemania Hamburg		2009–2012			
Jazz-Museum Bix Eiben		1987–2013			

=== History & Culture ===
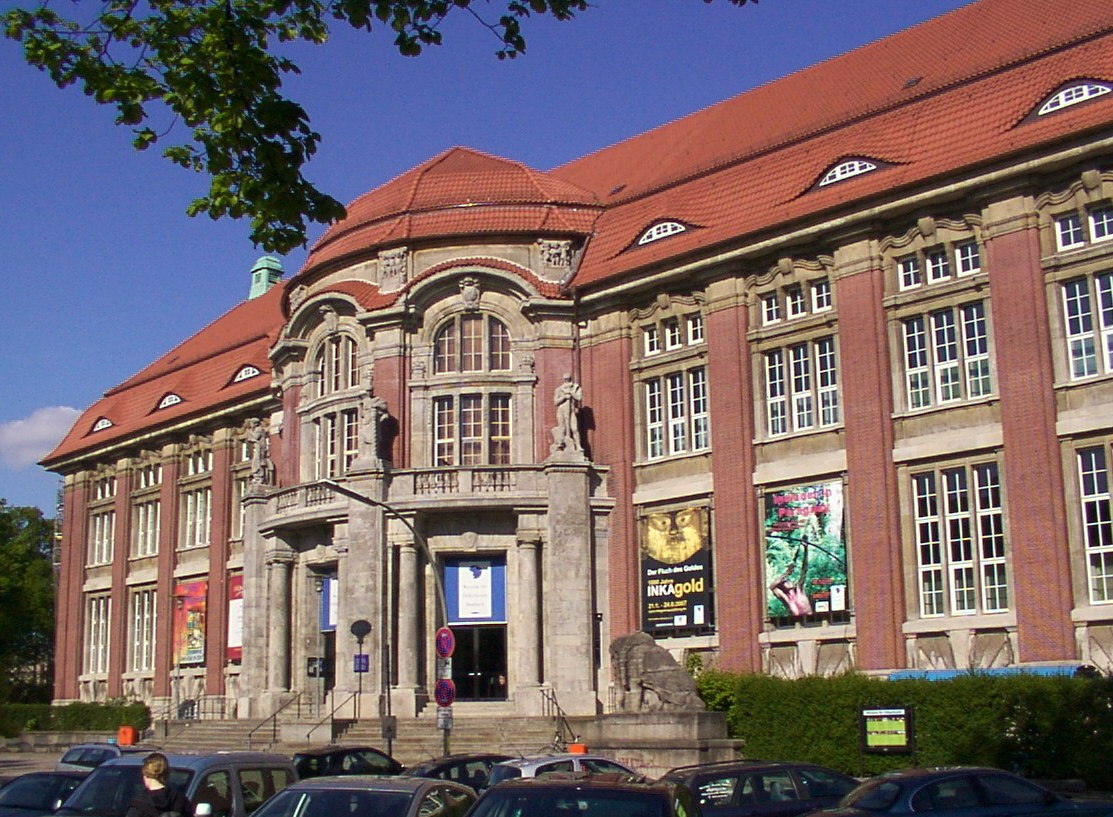
Front view of the Museum of Ethnology in 2007

Museum participates at the event Long Night of Museums.

German name	Description	Date	Location	Notes	Website
Afghanisches Museum	Culture and cultural history of Afghanistan	1998-2011	HafenCity		(in English)
Alstertal-Museum	Historical and cultural information of the area	1957	Wellingsbüttel		(in German)
Altonaer Museum für Kunst und Kulturgeschichte	Art and cultural history of Northern Germany				(in German)
Archäologisches Museum Hamburg	Archaeological Museum of Hamburg, the southern neighbouring counties and the History of Harburg				(in German)
BallinStadt - Auswandererwelt Hamburg; BallinStadt - The Emigration Museum	Emigration via Hamburg (1850–1934)	2004	Veddel		(in English)
Biozentrum Grindel und Zoologisches Museum	Zoological museum	1843 (1969)			(in English)
Cap San Diego	Museum ship	1986	St. Pauli; Landungsbrücken		(in German)
Deutsches Zollmuseum	History of German customs	1927 (1993)			(in German)
Gedenkstätte Ernst Thälmann	Ernst Thälmann Memorial Museum	1969	Eppendorf		(in German)
Internationales Maritimes Museum Hamburg	Naval history, model ships, naval uniforms and maritime art		HafenCity		(in English) selectable
Museum der Arbeit	People's history and industrialization in Hamburg	1985		(Note: An Anchor Point of ERIH, The European Route of Industrial Heritage)	(in English)
Museum für Kommunikation Hamburg	History of communication	1937 (1966)			(in German)
Museum am Rothenbaum – Kulturen und Künste der Welt	Museum at the Rothenbaum – Cultures and Arts of the World	1879			(in English)
Hamburgmuseum former: Museum für Hamburgische Geschichte	Museum of Hamburg history	1892			(in English)
Museum Elbinsel Wilhelmsburg		1907			(in German)
Museum Godeffroy		1861–1885		Closed	
KZ-Gedenkstätte Neuengamme	Memorial at Neuengamme concentration camp		Neuengamme		(in English)
Rickmer Rickmers	Museums ship, windjammer	1987	St. Pauli; Landungsbrücken		(in German)
Speicherstadt Museum	History of the Speicherstadt, tea and koffee trade				(in English) selectable
St. Pauli Museum		2005	St. Pauli		http://www.st-pauli-museum.com/
Stettin	Museums ship, steam icebreaker in the museum port of Oevelgoenne		Othmarschen		(in German)
WasserForum	Water in Hamburg, history and services		Rothenburgsort		(in German)

=== Science & Natural History ===
Museum participates at the event Long Night of Museums.

German name	Translation	Date	Location	Notes	Website
Geologisch-Paläontologisches Museum Hamburg	Hamburg Geological and Paleontological Museum	2014	Rotherbaum		(in German)
Hamburger Sternwarte	Hamburg Observatory	1912	Bergedorf		(in German)
Mineralogisches Museum Hamburg	Hamburg Mineralogical Museum	1907 (1969)	Grindelviertel		(in English)
Planetarium Hamburg	Hamburg Planetarium	1930	Hamburg Stadtpark		(in German)

=== Other ===
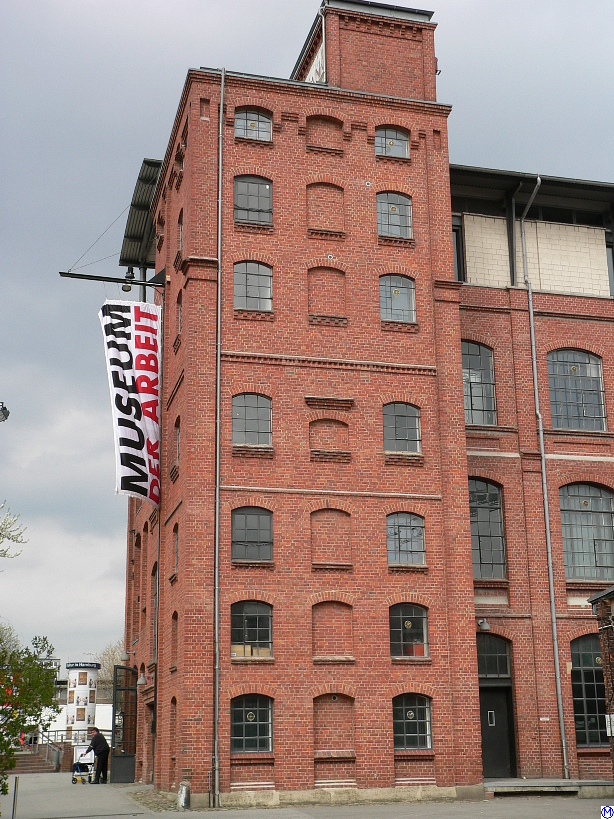
Museum der Arbeit main building

Museum participates at the event Long Night of Museums.

German name	Translation	Date	Location	Notes	Website
„Die Dachbodenbande“	Attic caboodle		HafenCity	Toy museum	(in German)
FC St Pauli Museum	1910 - Museum für den FC St. Pauli E.v.	2017	Millerntor Stadion	Football/Fan Culture	(in German)
Hafenmuseum	Port museum				(in German)
Hamburg Dungeon					
Hamburger Schulmuseum	Hamburg Museums for Schools				(in German)
Hamburger SV Museum		2004			(in German)
KL!CK Kindermuseum	Children's museum				(in German)
Miniatur Wunderland		2001	HafenCity	Rail transport modelling	(in English)
Prototyp – Personen. Kraft. Wagen.			HafenCity	Car museum	(in English) selectable
Spicy's Gewürzmuseum	Spice museum	1991	HafenCity		partly (in English)

== See also ==
- List of castles in Hamburg
- List of churches in Hamburg
- List of libraries in Hamburg
- List of theatres in Hamburg
- List of Museums in Hamburg
