= Composers Quarter Hamburg =

Six museums in Hamburg-Neustadt, Germany

- KomponistenQuartier Hamburg
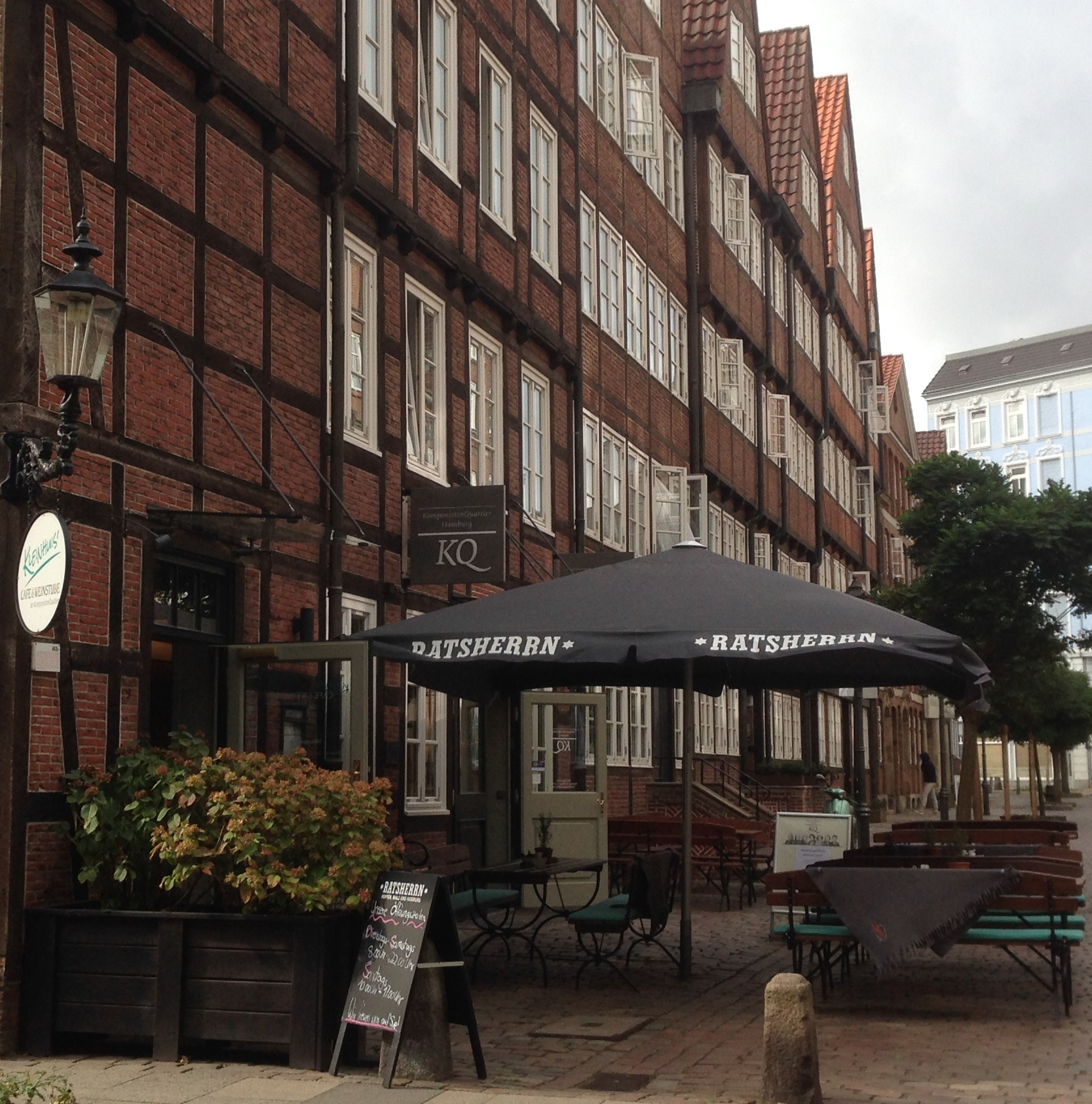
- entrance of five of the six musea

- Location within Hamburg Location within Germany
- Established: 2015
- Location: Peterstraße 29-39, Hamburg-Neustadt
- Coordinates: 53°33′4.46″N 9°58′36.73″E
- Type: biographical museums
- Curator: dr. Alexander Odefey
- Owner: Komponistenquartier Hamburg e.V.
- Website: www.komponistenquartier.de

The Composers Quarter Hamburg (German: Komponistenquartier Hamburg) is a gathering of six museums in the Peterstraße in Hamburg-Neustadt, Germany. The associated museums have one or two classical composers as a theme who were born or have lived in the city of Hamburg.

The museums are located in restored historical buildings. With the use of multimedia the lives and works of the composers are being cleared. Insight is being given why the composers may still matter in the current era.

The quarter is represented by the association with the same name that was founded in 2015. The following list shows the member museums, the composers that are themed and the year of establishment:

- Brahms Museum, Johannes Brahms, 1971
- Telemann Museum, Georg Philipp Telemann, 2011
- Carl Philipp Emanuel Bach Museum, Carl Philipp Emanuel Bach, 2015
- Johann Adolph Hasse Museum, Johann Adolph Hasse, 2015
- Gustav Mahler Museum, Gustav Mahler, 2018
- Fanny & Felix Mendelssohn Museum, Fanny and Felix Mendelssohn, 2018

== See also ==
- List of museums in Germany
- List of music museums
