= Telemann Museum =

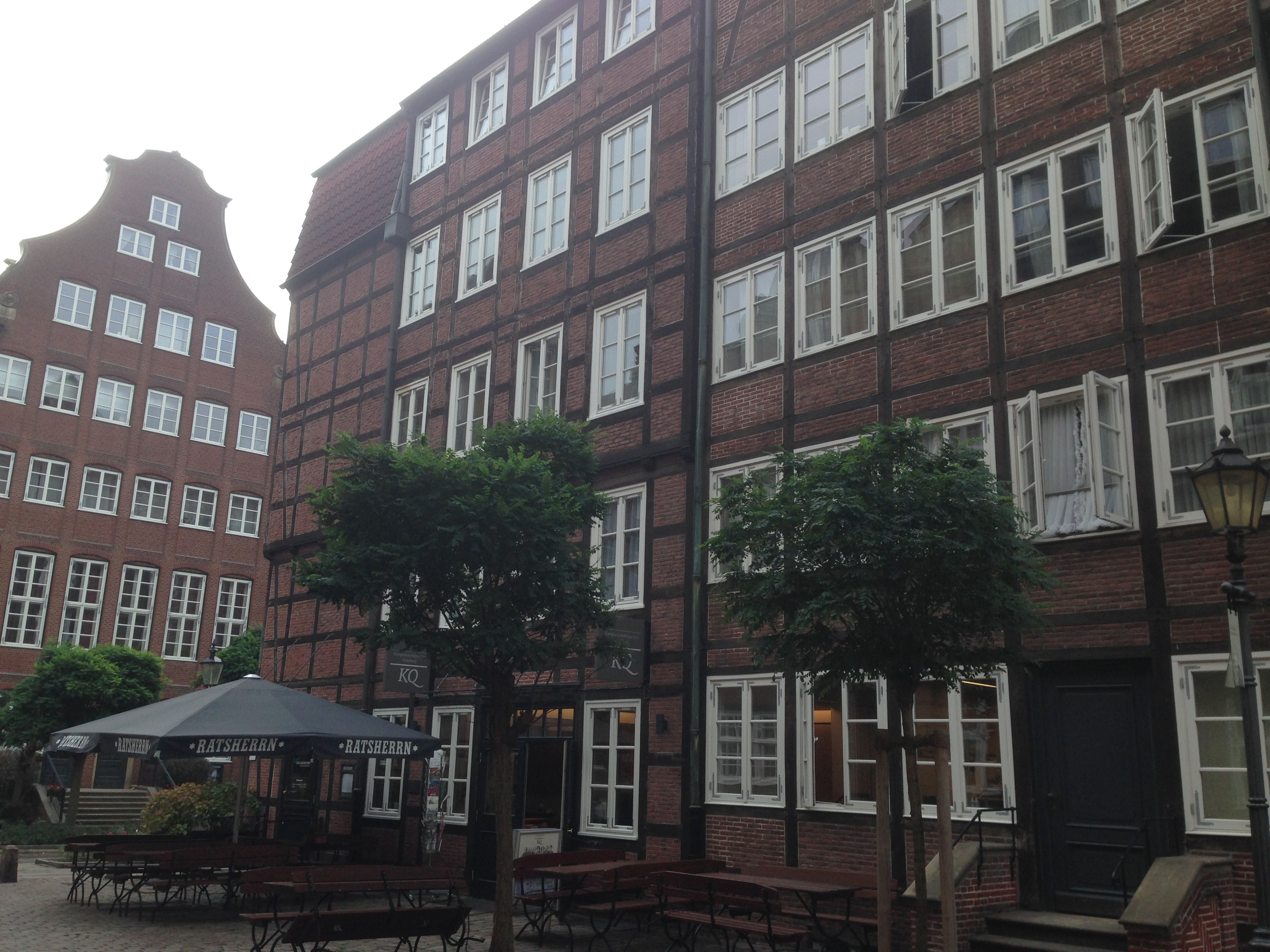
- Entrance of the museum

- Location within Hamburg Location within Germany
- Established: 2011
- Location: Peterstraße 29, Hamburg-Neustadt
- Coordinates: 53°33′4.46″N 9°58′35.57″E
- Type: biographical museum
- Collections: about Georg Philipp Telemann
- Curator: dr. Alexander Odefey
- Website: www.telemann-museum.de

The Telemann Museum is a museum in the Composers Quarter in Hamburg-Neustadt, Germany. It was founded in 2011 and is dedicated to the classical composer Georg Philipp Telemann.

The museum is situated in an historical building in the Peterstraße, where Telemann lived and worked from 1721 until his death in 1767. The presentation highlights his personality, including his passion for his botanic garden, and the significance he had musically and culturally in his era.

A great deal of attention is given to Telemann's church music and his secular compositions in such fields as opera. The museum houses old archives and maintains an extensive library of books that center on the history of music and culture of the 18th century. The exposition shows first issues and a number of utensils, like an original spinet from 1730 of the builder Thomas Hitchcock. This instrument is used during music performances in the museum.

== Impression ==
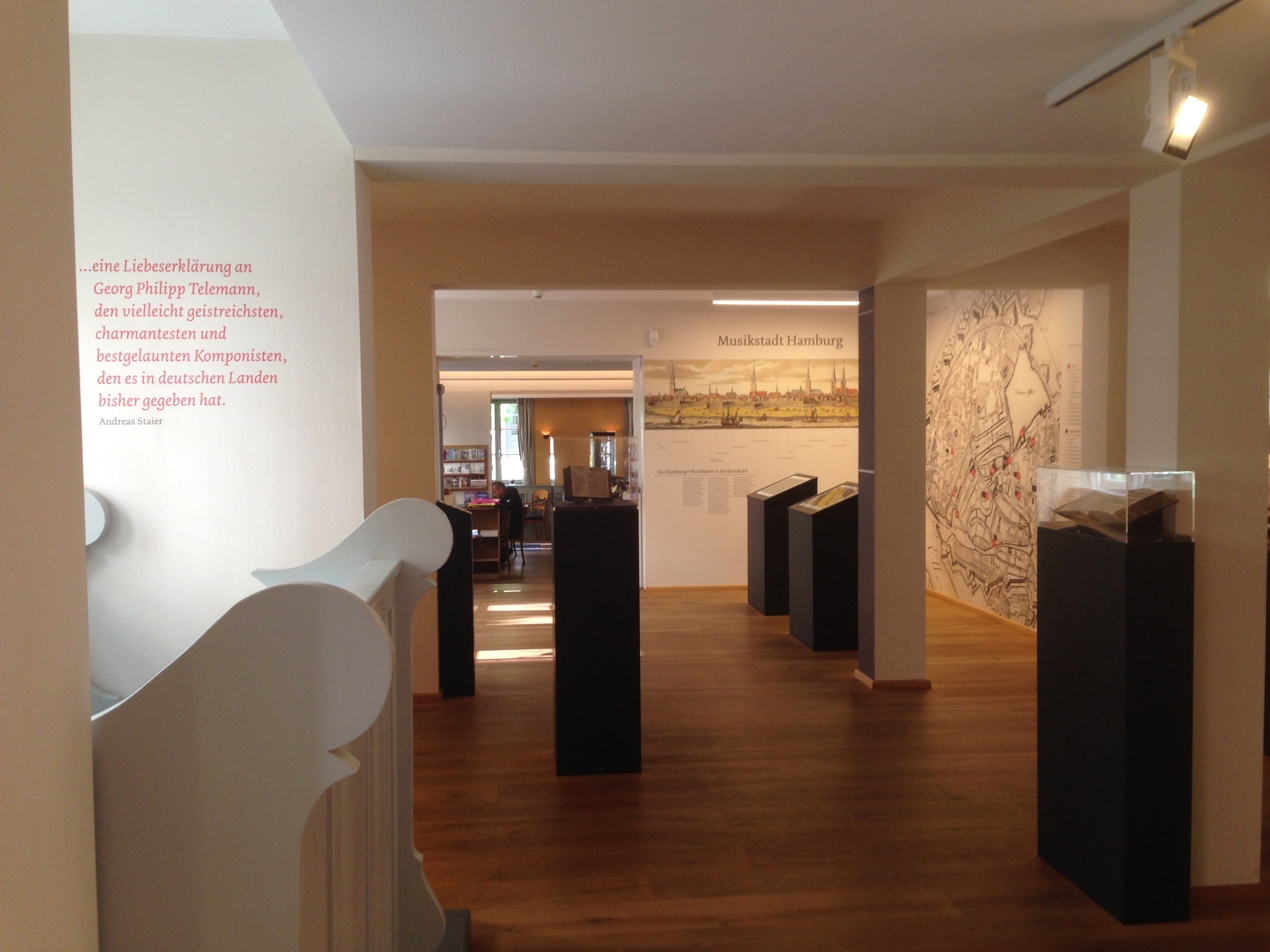

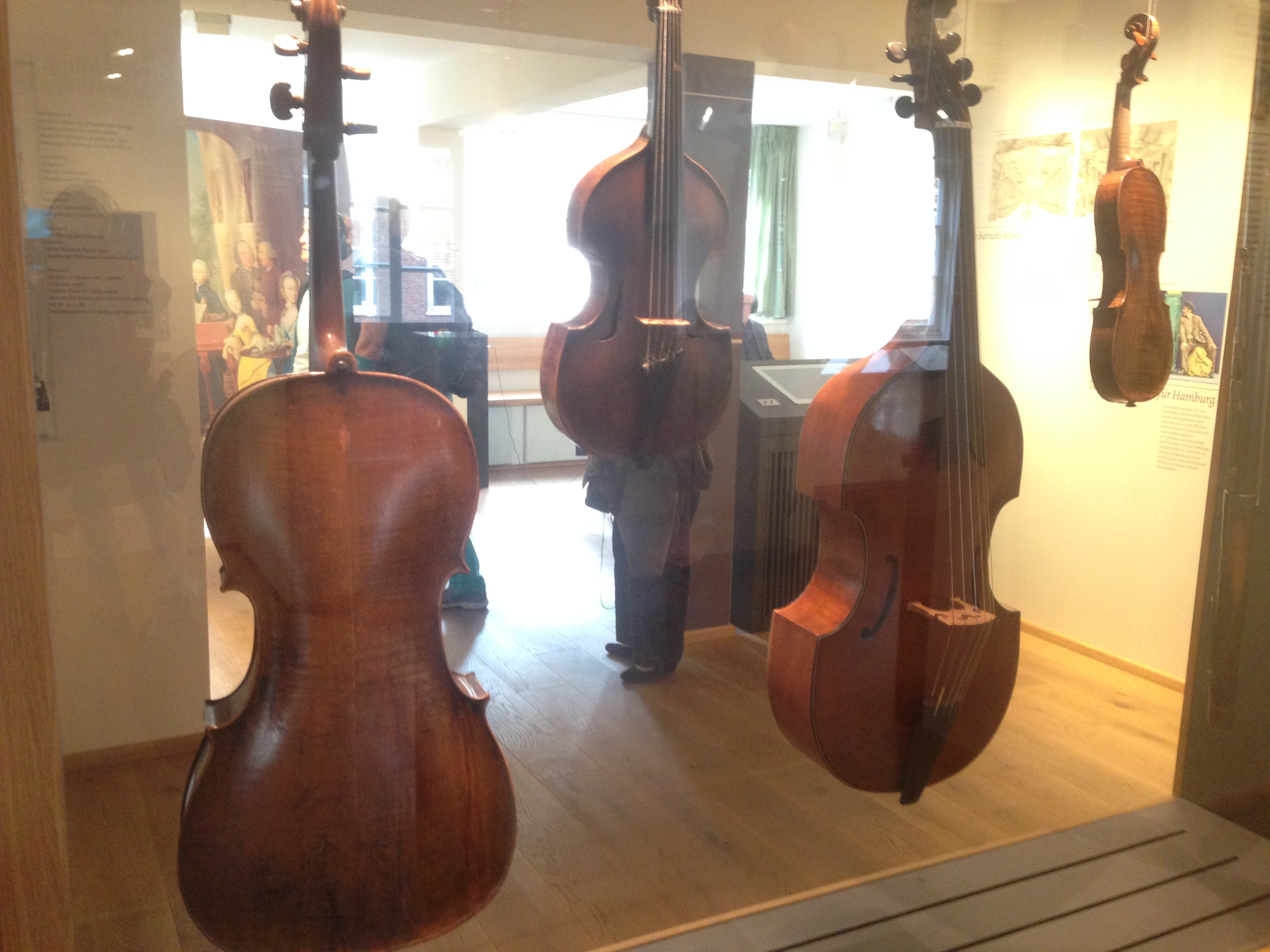

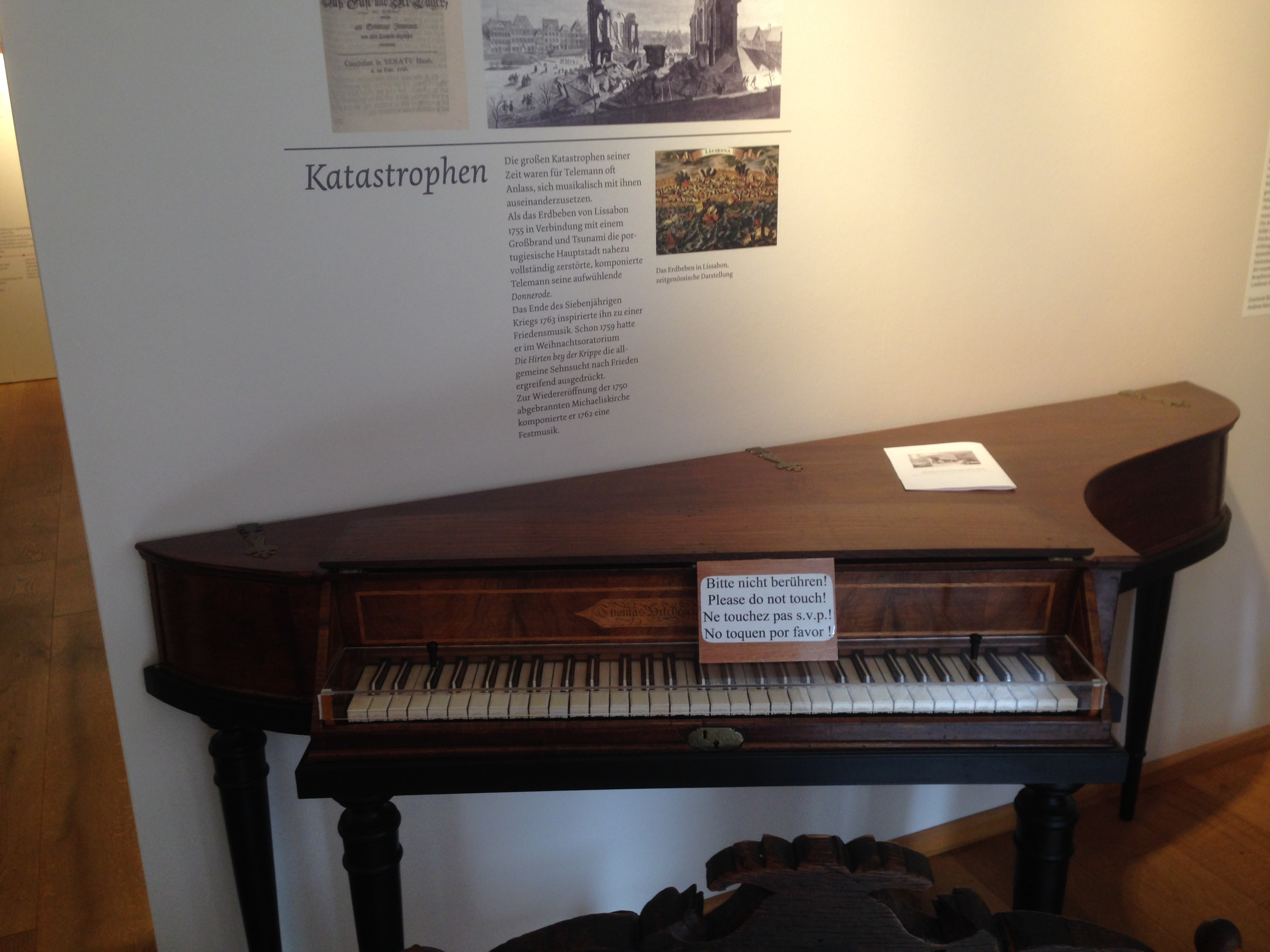

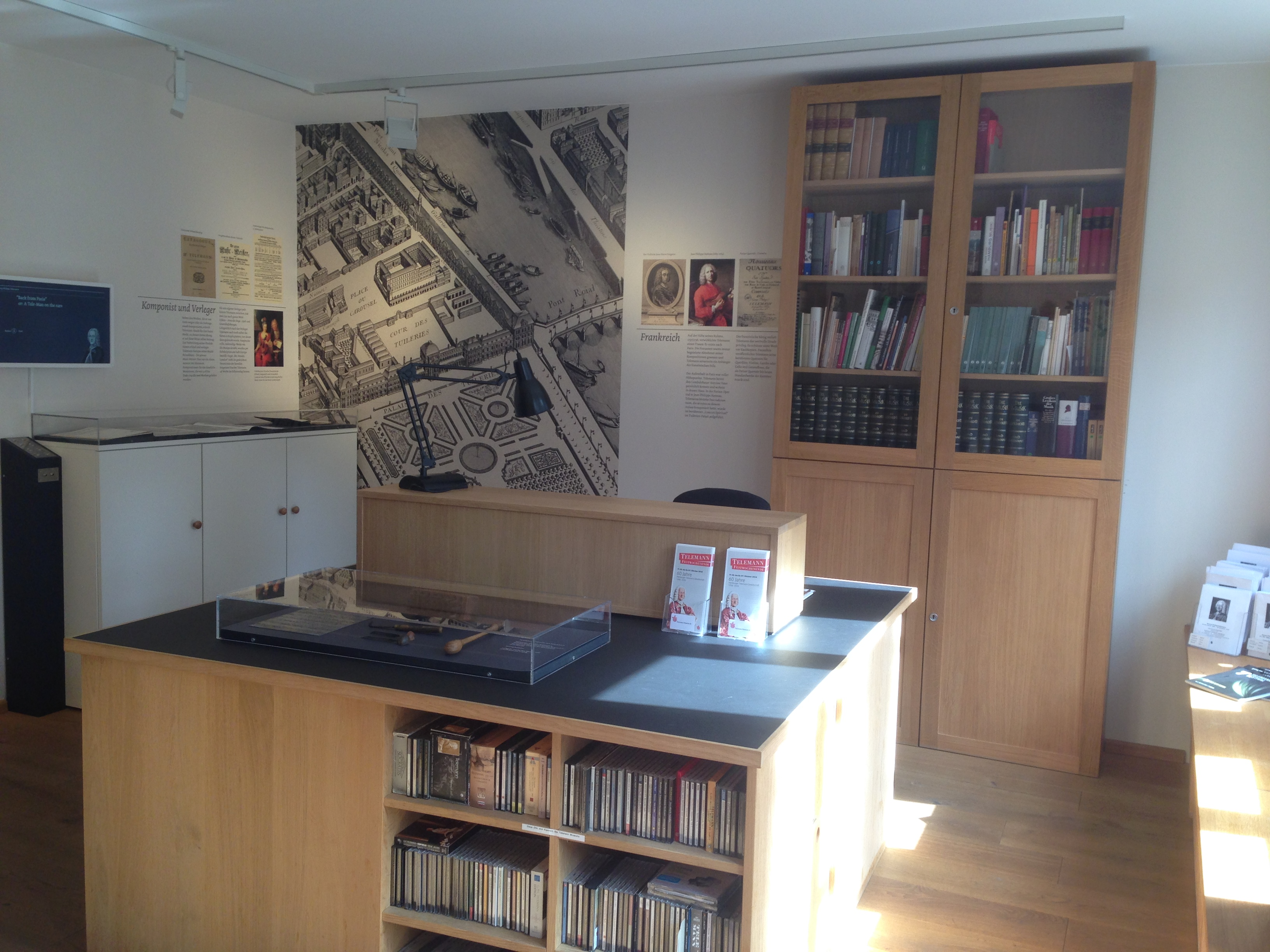

== See also ==
- List of museums in Germany
- List of music museums
