= Museum Elbinsel Wilhelmsburg =

Museum in Germany

Coordinates: 53°29′16″N 10°01′05″E

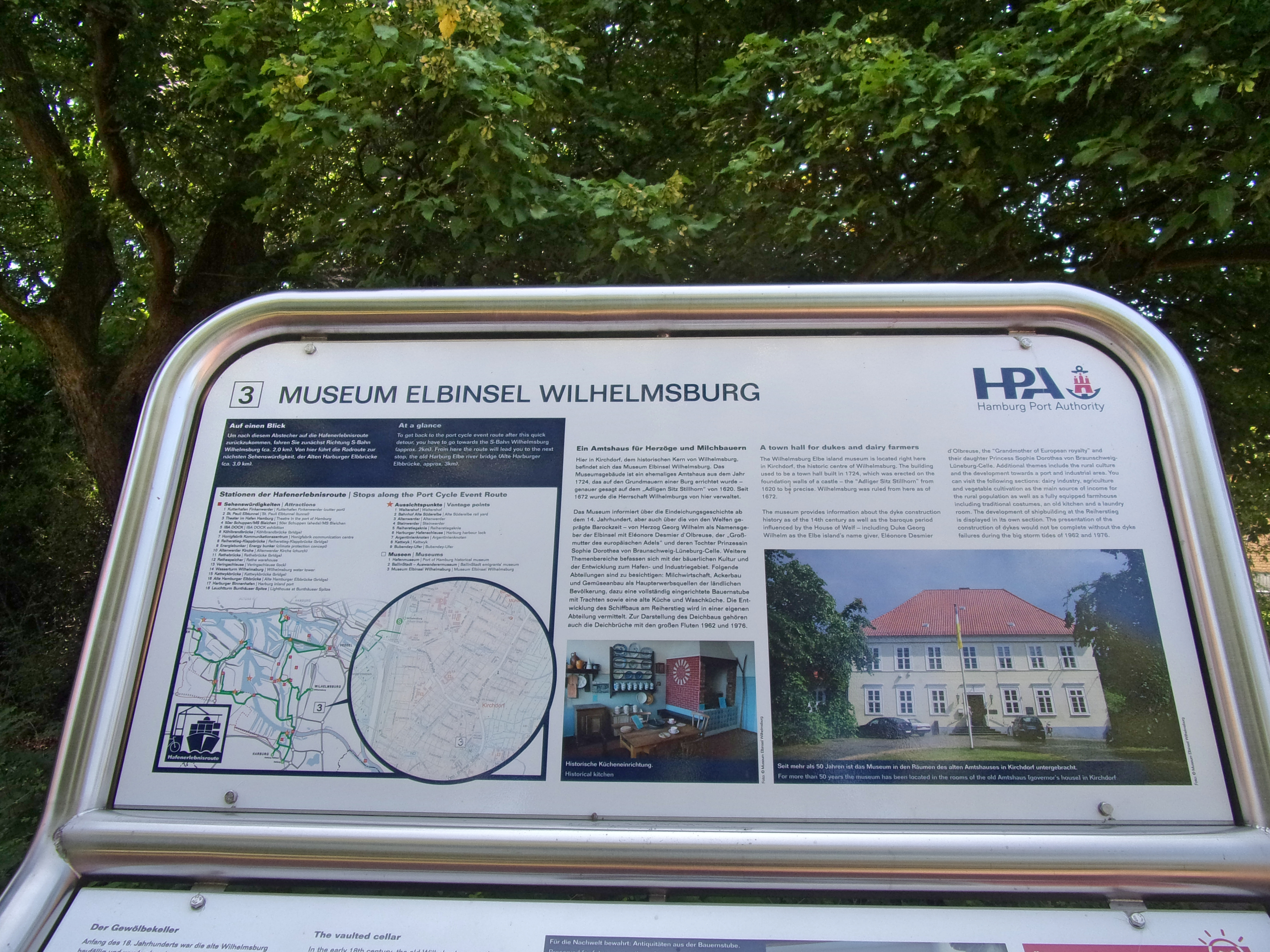

Museum Elbinsel Wilhelmsburg, Hamburg

Elbinsel Museum is a museum in Kirchdorf Süd, Wilhelmsburg, Hamburg, Germany. The museum was founded in 1907 by a local history group. The first collections were exhibited in a room of the local city hall that was built in 1903. At that time many industrial enterprises were established the area near the port of Hamburg. Farmhouses and cottages had to give way to provide housing for factory employees. This left large amounts of furniture and antiques behind. It enabled the local history group to hold valuable old pieces and preserve them for posterity, but the one room storage area at the local City Hall where the items were stored was soon filled to the brim. Finding numerous other places to hold the ever-growing collection proved to be unsuccessful, in 1942 it moved into its final destination which were on the premises of the old administrative building in Kirchdorf, where it has enjoyed great popularity for the last 50 years.

The museum participates at the event Long Night of Museums in Hamburg.
