= Brahms Museum (Hamburg) =

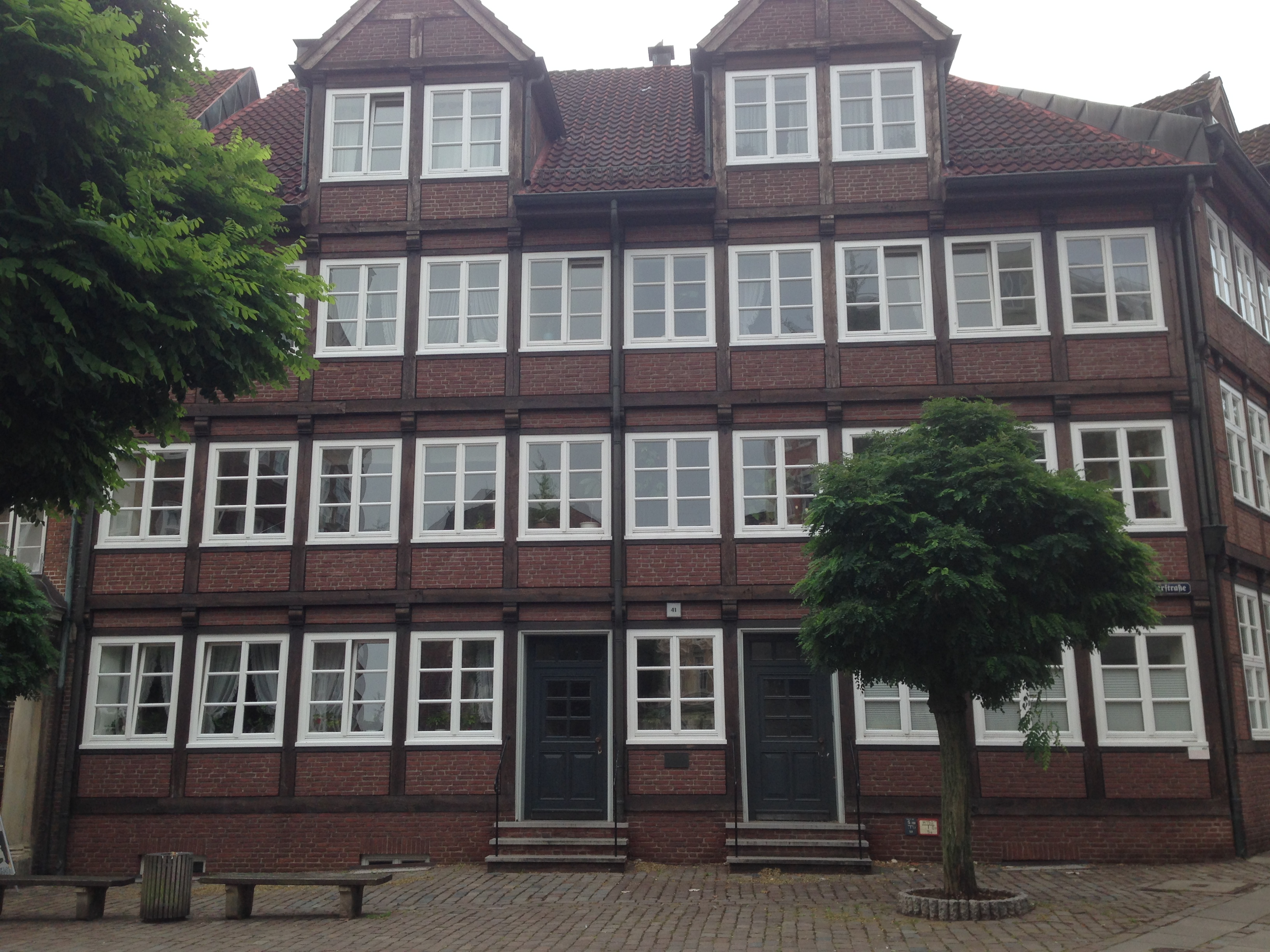
- entrance of the museum
- Established: 1971
- Location: Peterstraße 39, Hamburg-Neustadt
- Coordinates: 53°33′4.46″N 9°58′36.73″E
- Type: biographical museum
- Collections: about Johannes Brahms
- Curator: Alexander Odefey
- Website: www.brahms-hamburg.de/museum/

The Brahms Museum is a museum in the Composers Quarter in Hamburg-Neustadt, Germany. It is dedicated to the classical composer Johannes Brahms.

== Collection and activities ==
The museum was founded in 1971 and is situated on two stories of an historical building in the Peterstraße, near to where Brahms was born. A section of the collection deals with the first three decades of his life in Hamburg. One can see the table piano of Baumgardten & Heins from circa 1860 on which Brahms gave piano lessons. Several utensils from his life are shown, as well as artworks, several busts and an extensive collection of photographs.

There is a library with more than 300 books, the complete edition of Brahms of the publisher G. Henle Verlag, audio recordings, a number replicas of music notations, letters, concert programs, and other documents.

The Lichtwark-Saal of the Carl Toepfer Foundation, a location near to the museum, is a place for temporary Brahms exhibitions, lectures and concerts. Regularly there are walking tours through Hamburg along historical places out of the life of Brahms.

== Impression ==
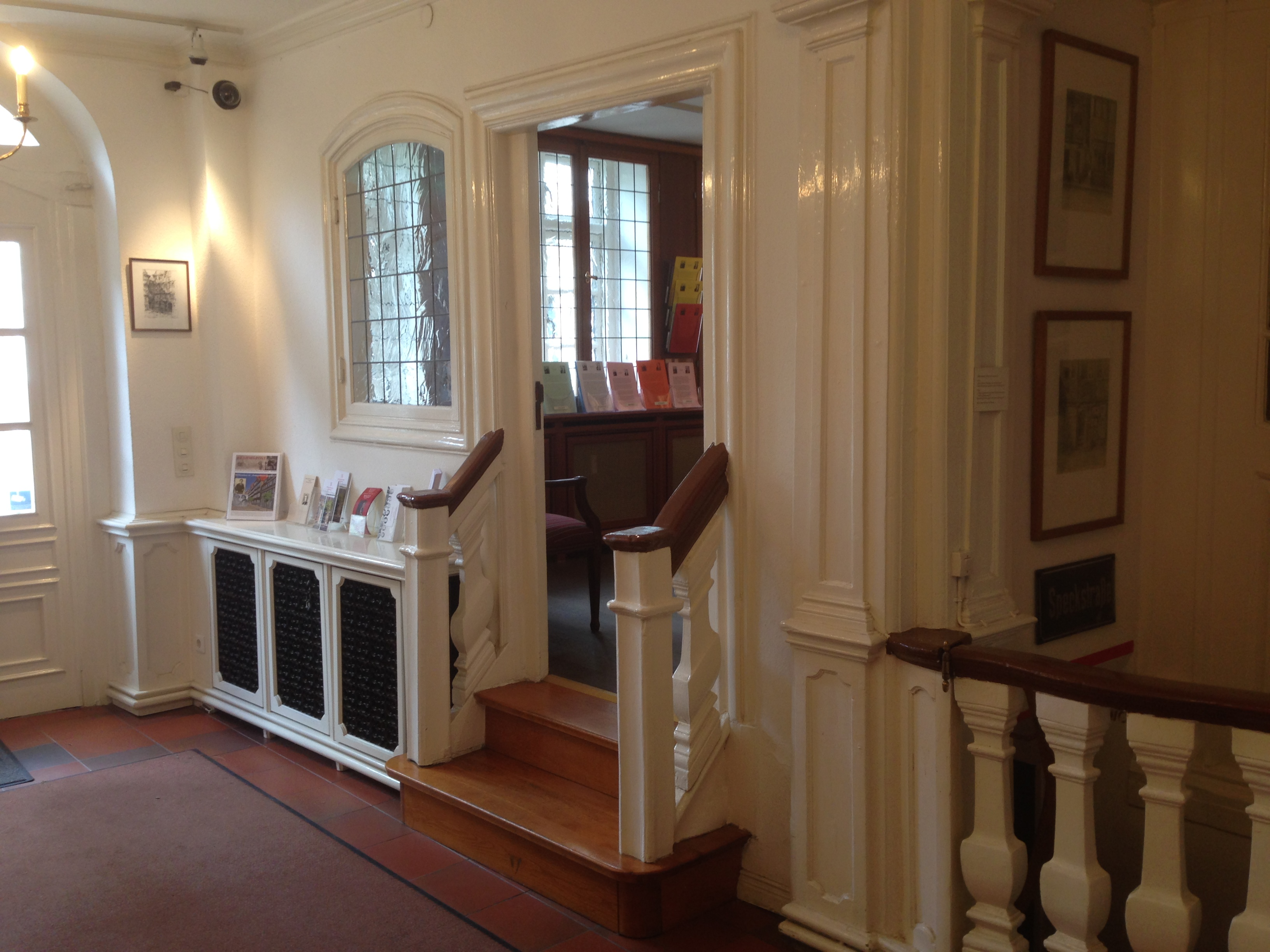

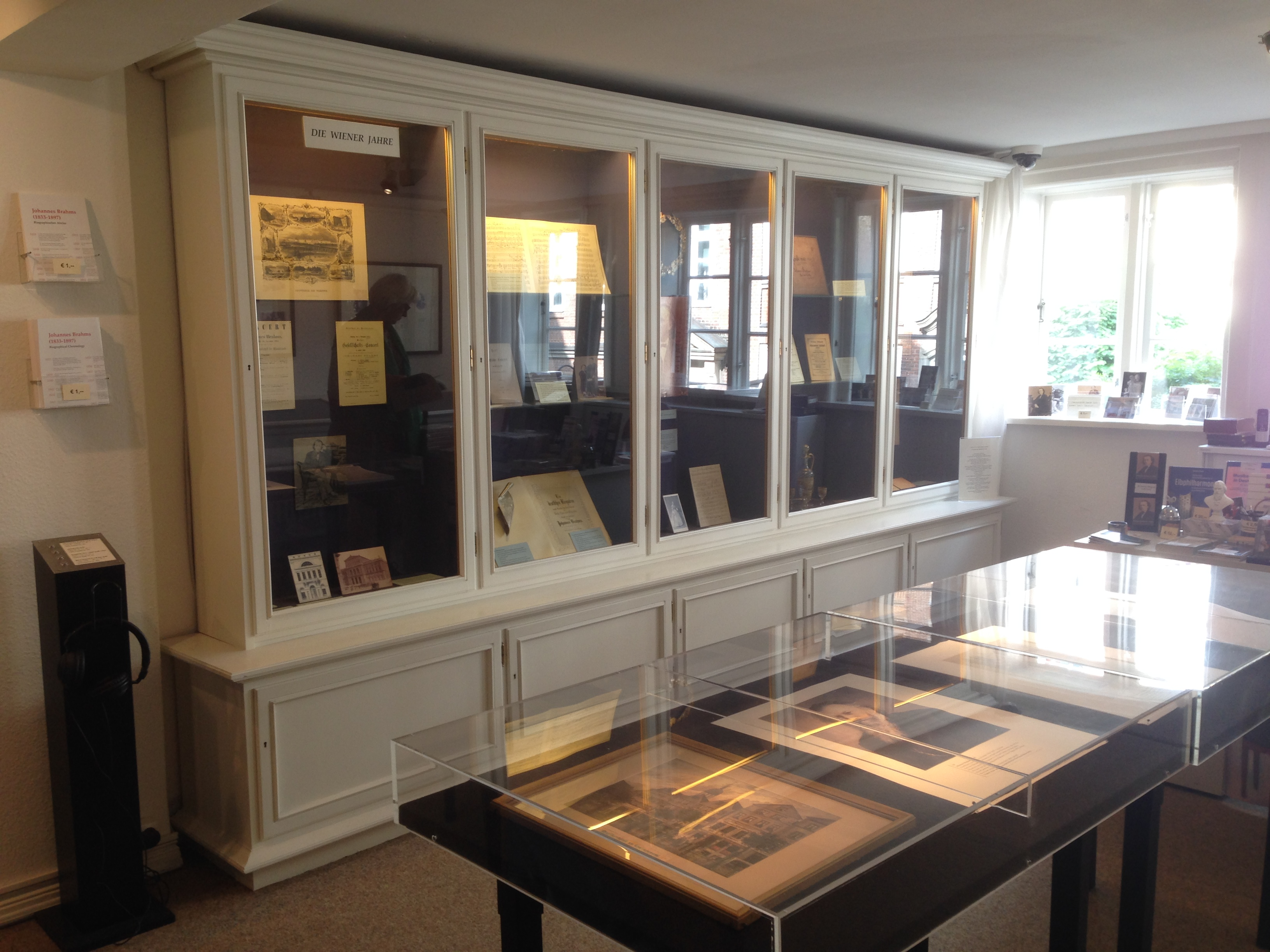

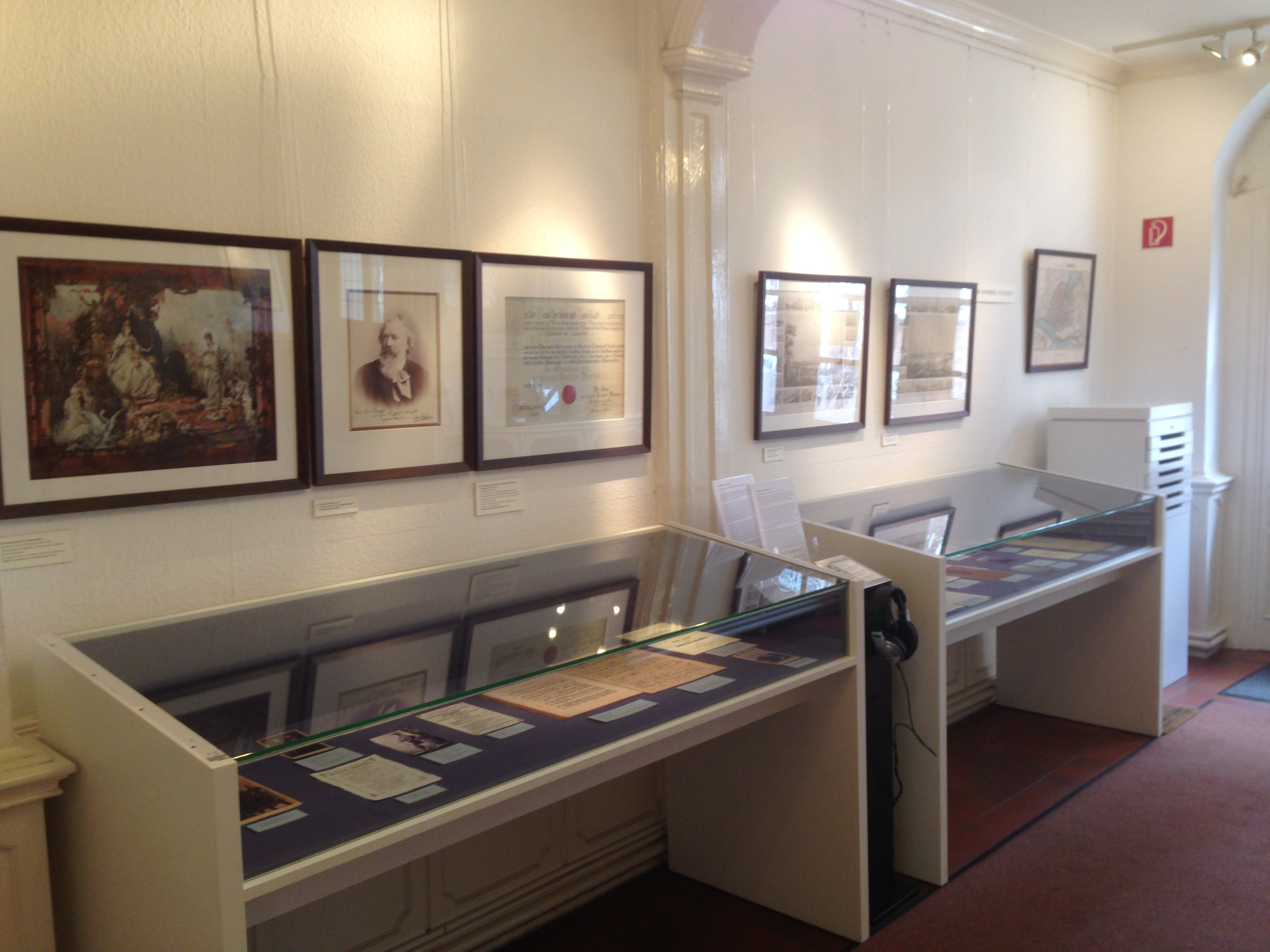

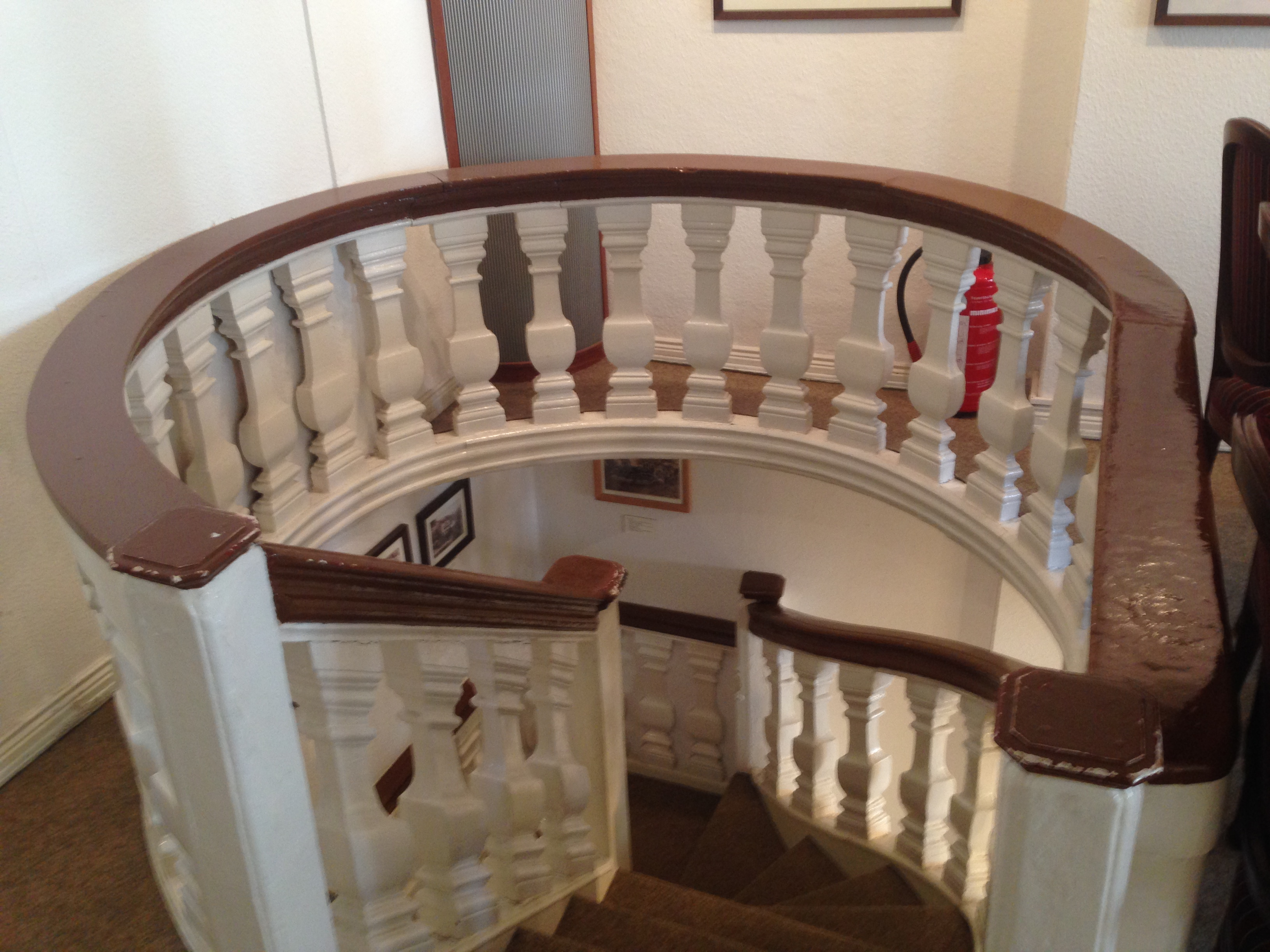

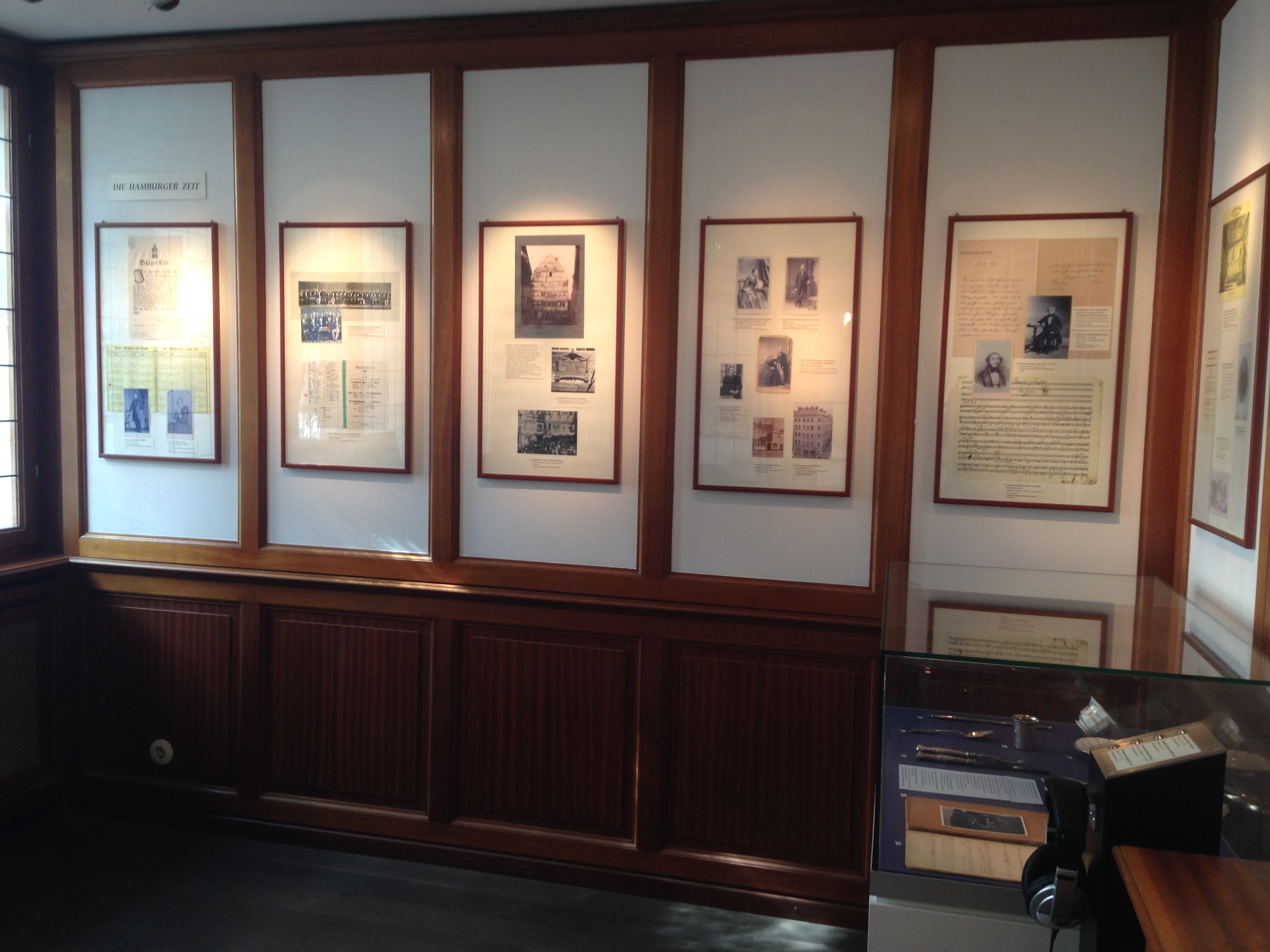

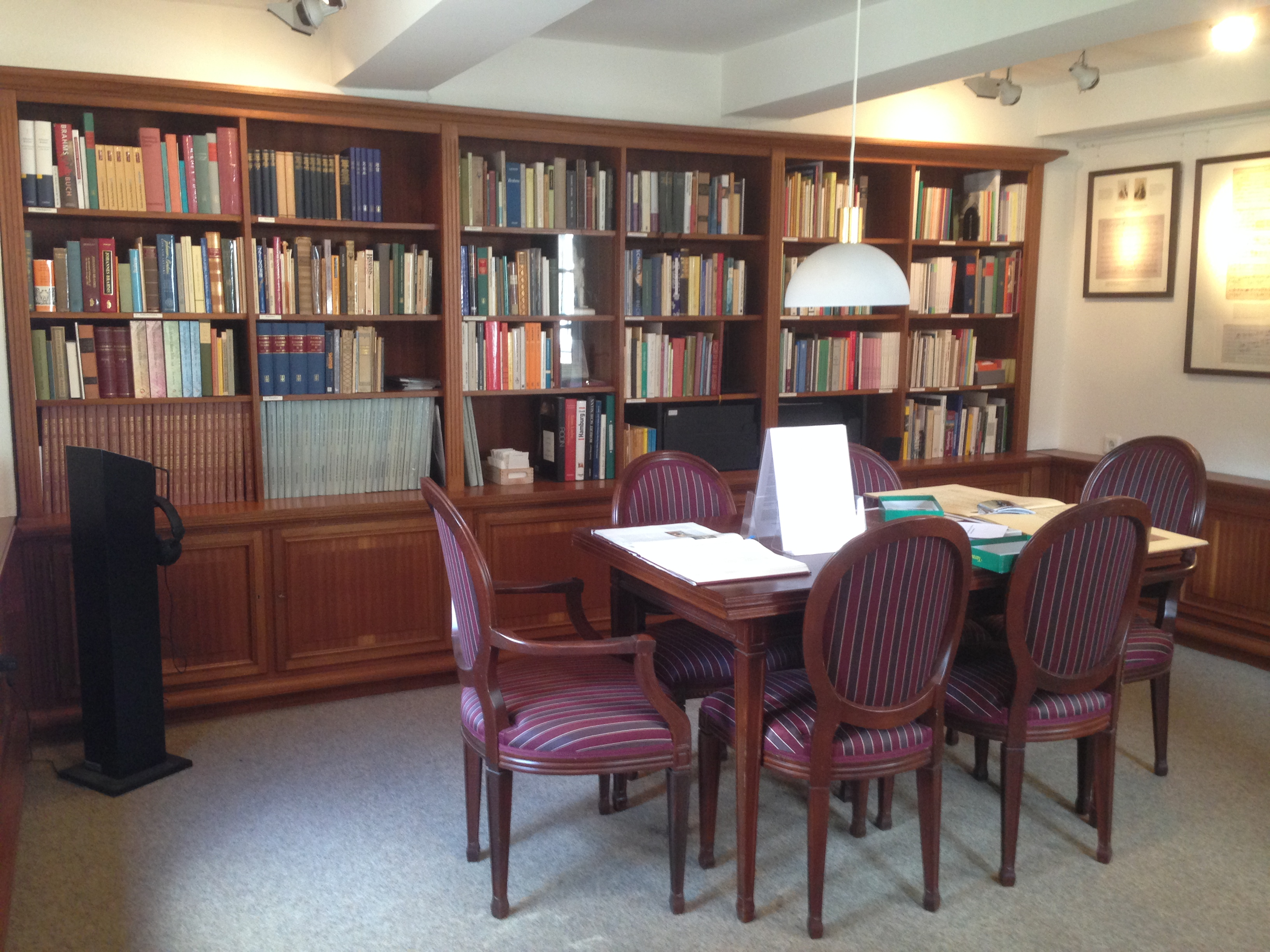

== See also ==
- List of museums in Germany
- List of music museums
