= Johann Adolph Hasse Museum =

Johann Adolf Hasse Museum
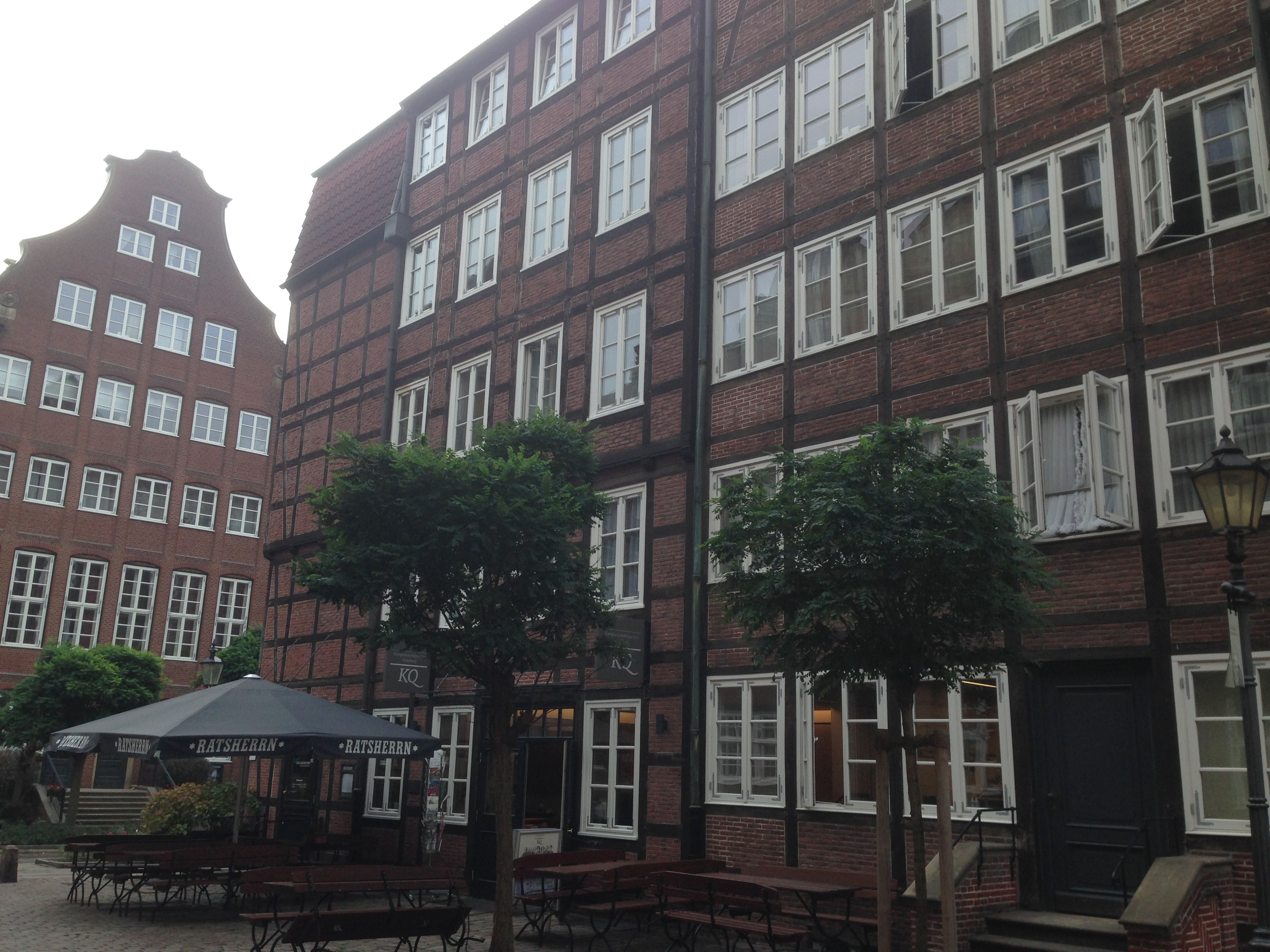
- entrance of the museum

- Location within Hamburg Location within Germany
- Established: 18 March 2015
- Location: Peterstraße 29, Hamburg-Neustadt
- Coordinates: 53°33′4.46″N 9°58′35.57″E
- Type: biographical museum
- Collections: about Johann Adolf Hasse
- Curator: dr. Alexander Odefey
- Website: www.komponistenquartier.de/die-museen/johann-adolf-hasse-museum/

The Johann Adolph Hasse Museum is a museum in the Composers Quarter in Hamburg-Neustadt, Germany.

The museum is dedicated to the life and work of the opera composer Johann Adolph Hasse. The presentation starts with his childhood and youth, Hasse being a descendant of church musicians from Hamburg-Bergedorf. He obtained his first music lessons from his father.

The presentation continues with his career as a prominent composer. He and his wife, the opera singer Faustina Bordoni, gained international prestige and played respected roles at the European courts and theaters.

The collection consists of text books of his operas (libretti), historical prints of musical compositions, scenic designs and costumes. One piece from the collection is a replica of an opera stage from the baroque era. The museum makes use of multimedia appliances and is accessible to wheelchair users.

== Impression ==
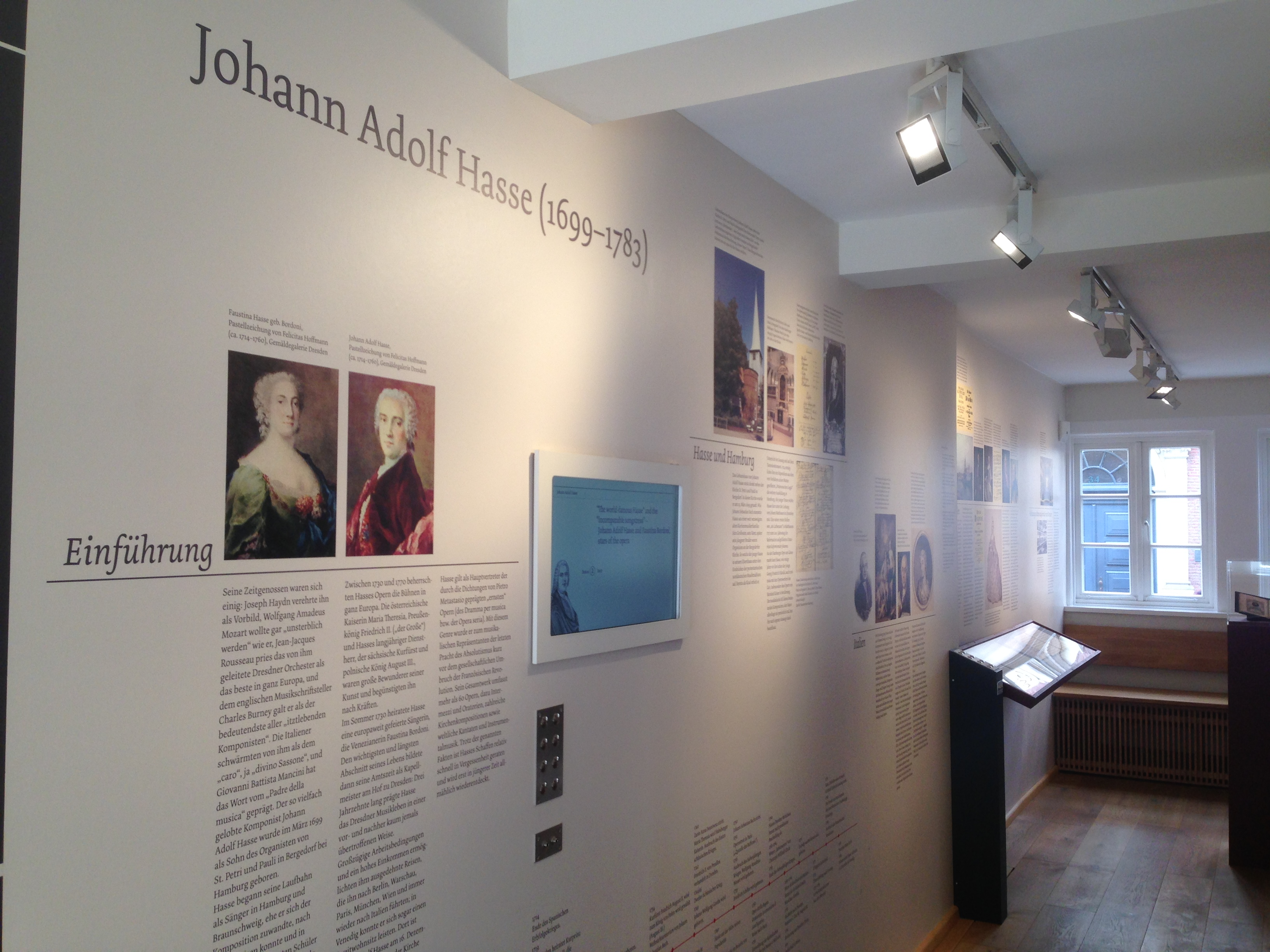

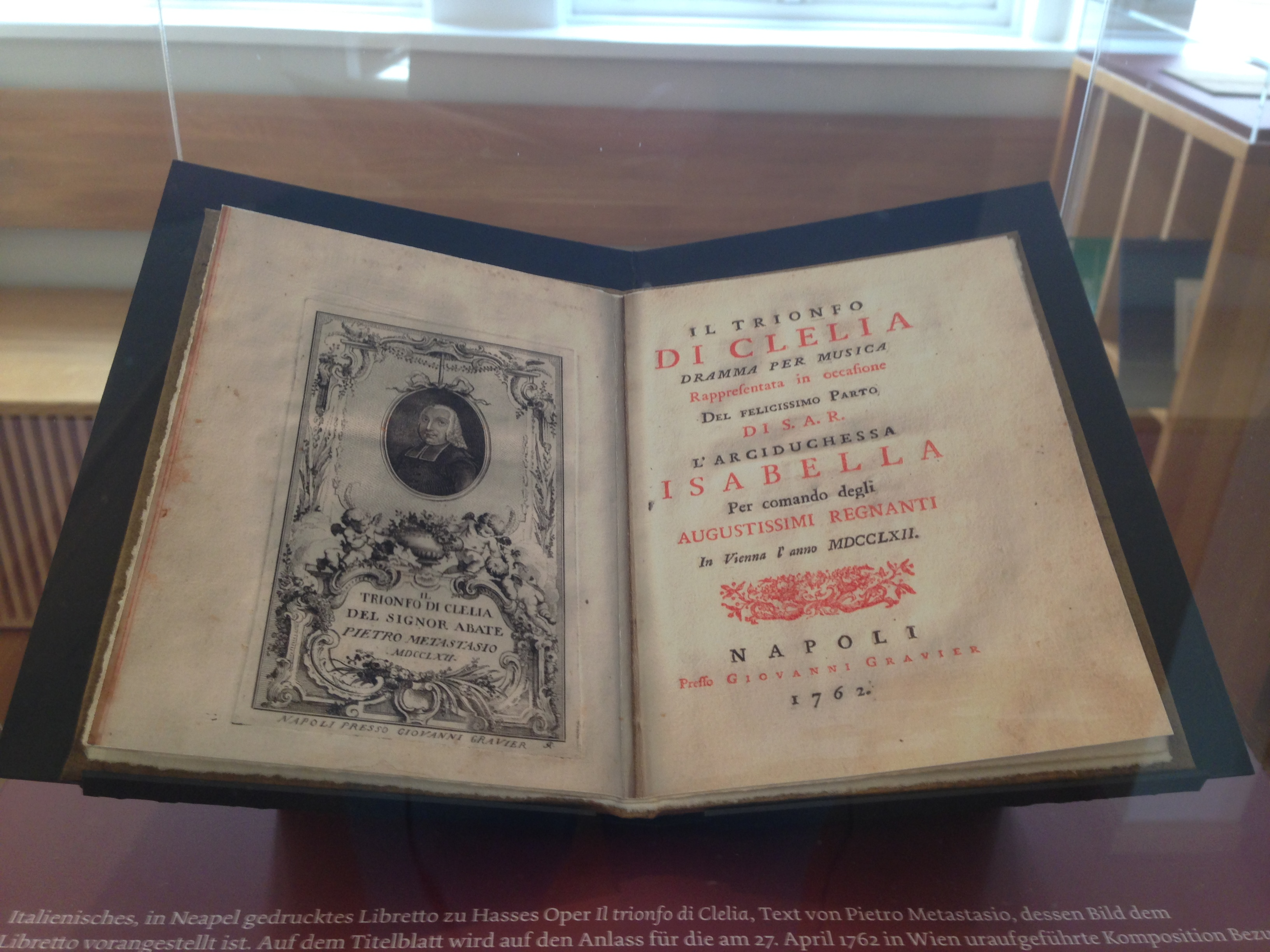

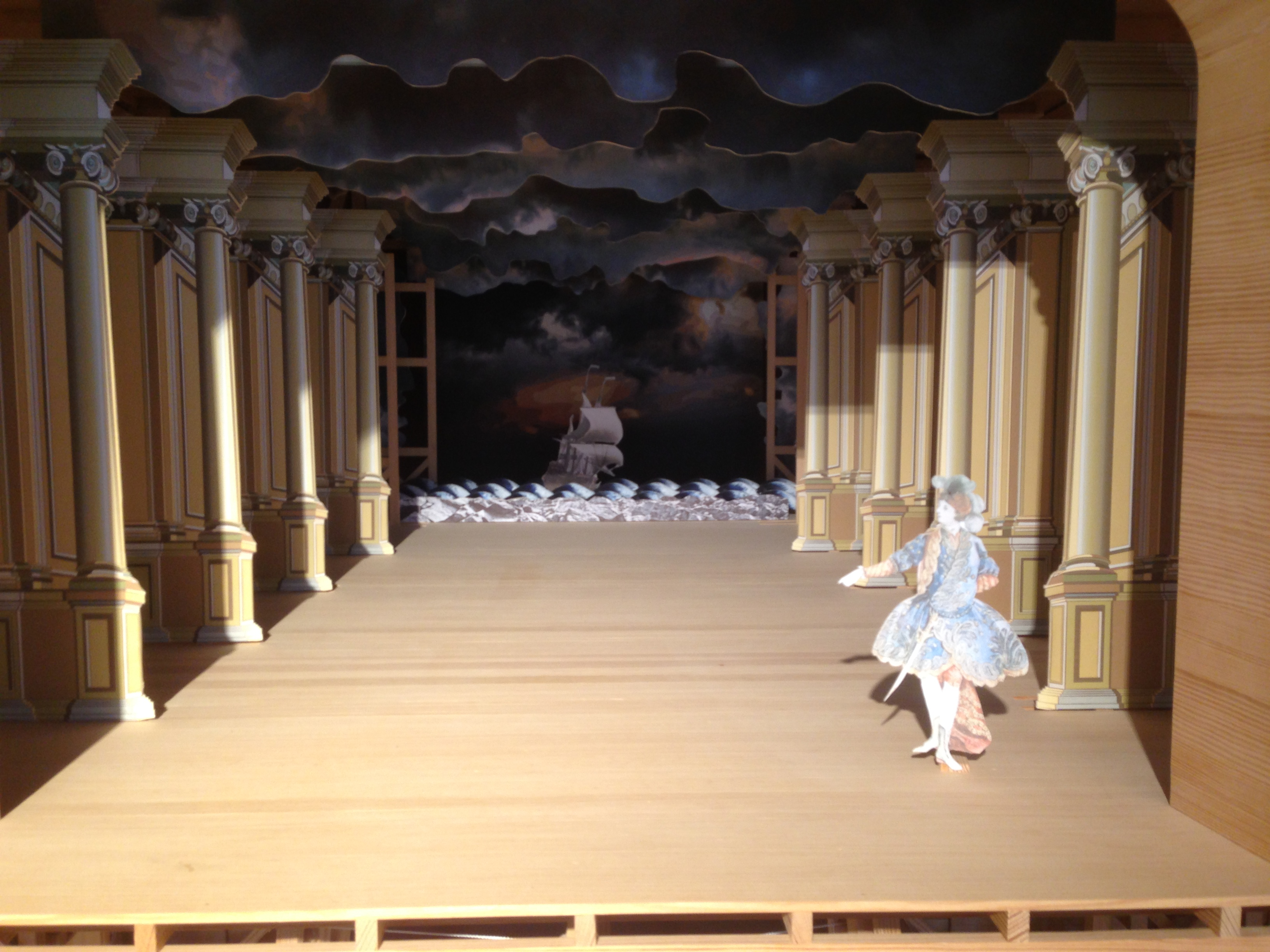

== See also ==
- List of museums in Germany
- List of music museums
