= Gustav Mahler Museum =

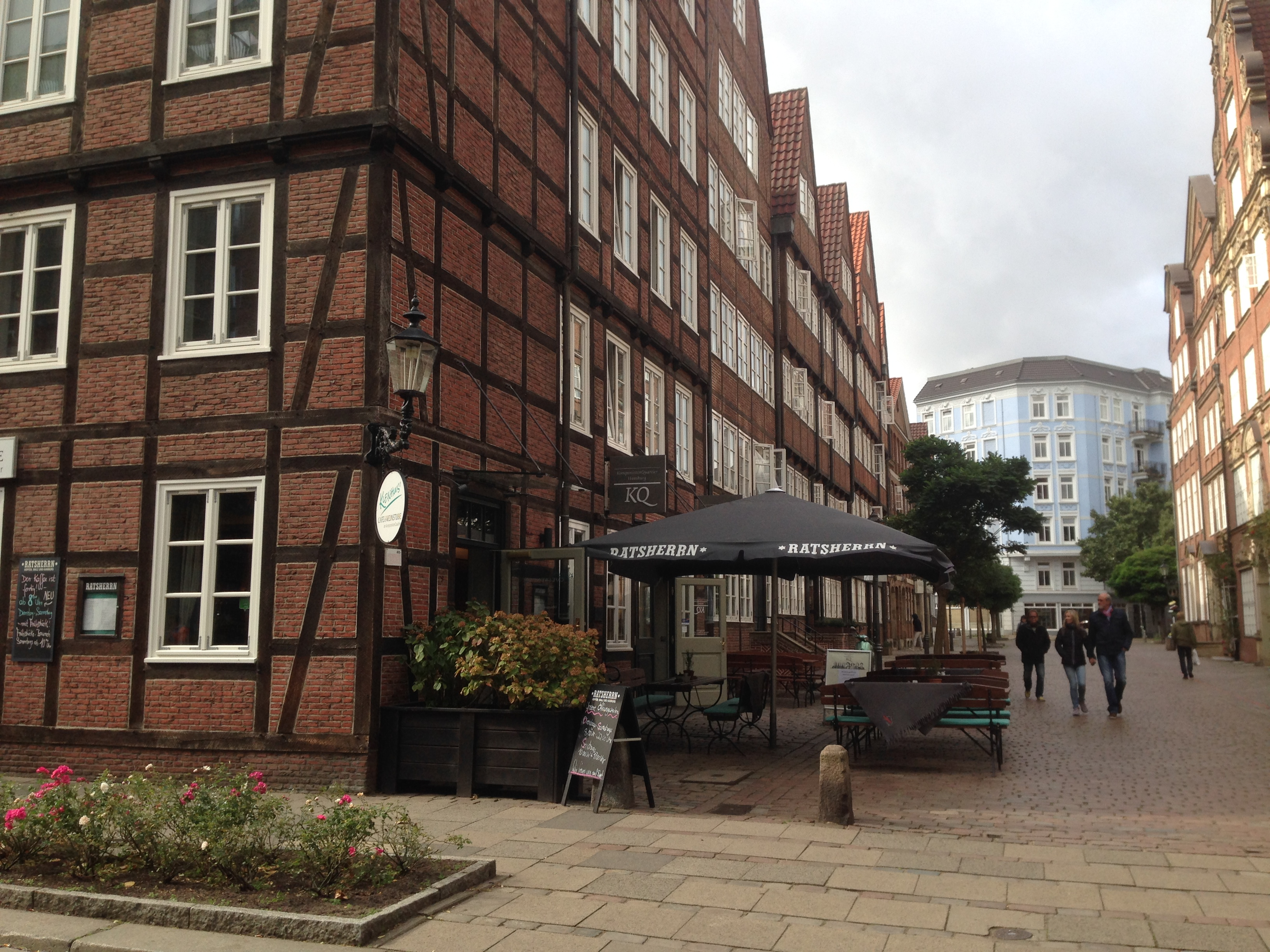
- entrance of the museum

- Location within Hamburg Location within Germany
- Established: 29 May 2018
- Location: Peterstraße 29, Hamburg-Neustadt
- Coordinates: 53°33′4.46″N 9°58′35.57″E
- Type: biographical museum
- Collections: about Gustav Mahler
- Curator: dr. Alexander Odefey
- Website: www.komponistenquartier.de/die-museen/gustav-mahler-museum/

The Gustav Mahler Museum is a museum in Hamburg-Neustadt, Germany, dedicated to the memory of the classical composer Gustav Mahler. Established in a historic building in the Composers Quarter, it opened on 29 May 2018.

Mahler worked from 1891 to 1897 in Hamburg as chief conductor of operas. The museum pays much attention to his compositions, including the song Des Knaben Wunderhorn, his second and third symphony.

The museum houses several exhibits, like a player piano made by Welte-Mignon, which reproduces the composition accurately in the way Mahler intended it to sound. Reproductions of placards on an advertising column announce concerts of his work. Leaning against the column a black bicycle from 1895 can be seen with handgrips of cork and an oil lamp. Mahler learned traveling by bike in Hamburg and became a passionate cyclist.

Construction work delayed the opening by a year. When the museum was finally opened, the second construction phase had not yet been fully completed. The museum has a floor surface of 300 m^{2} and makes much use of multimedia appliances. The limited existence of original pieces was attended to when the museum was fitted out.

== Gallery ==
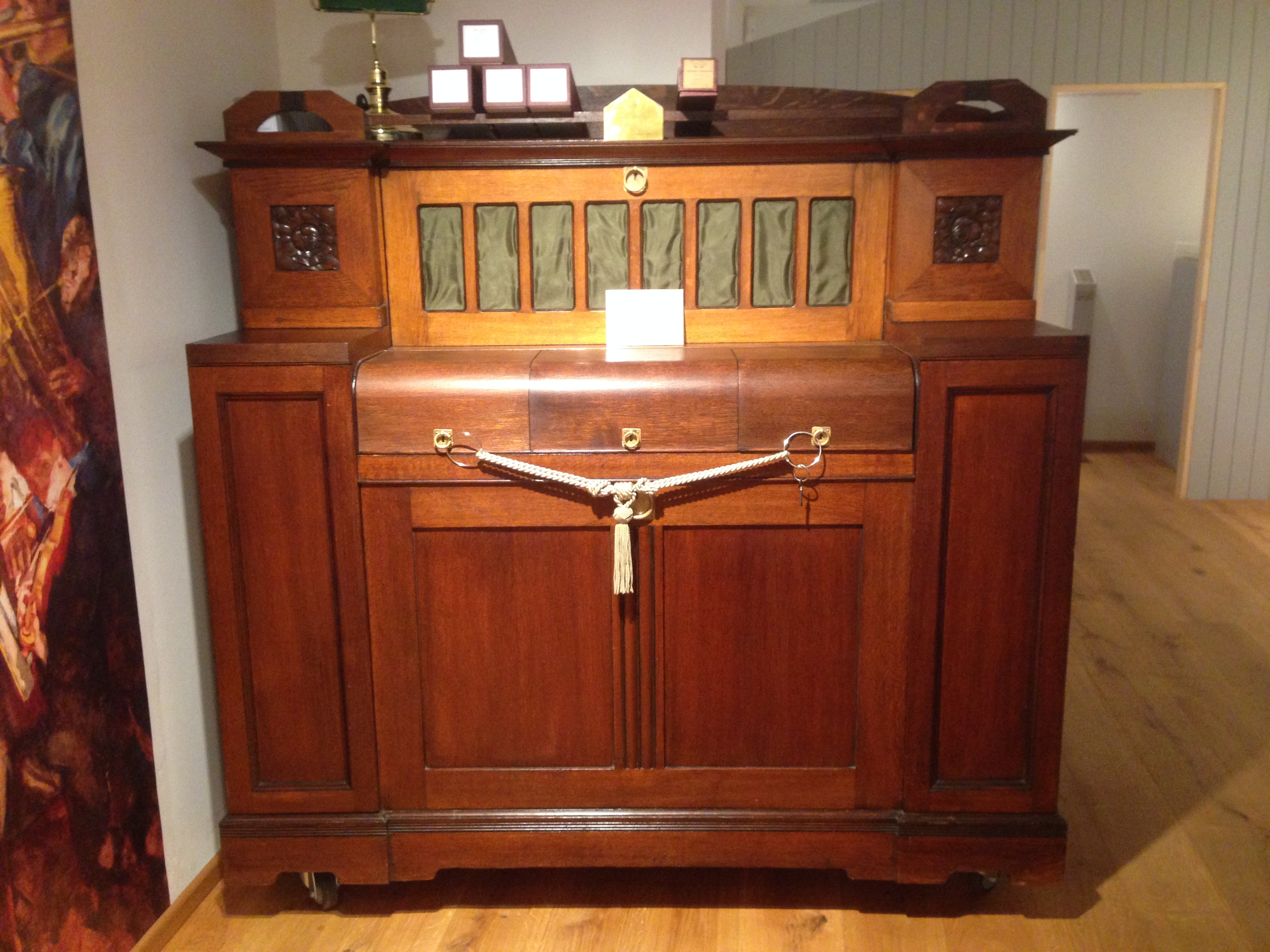

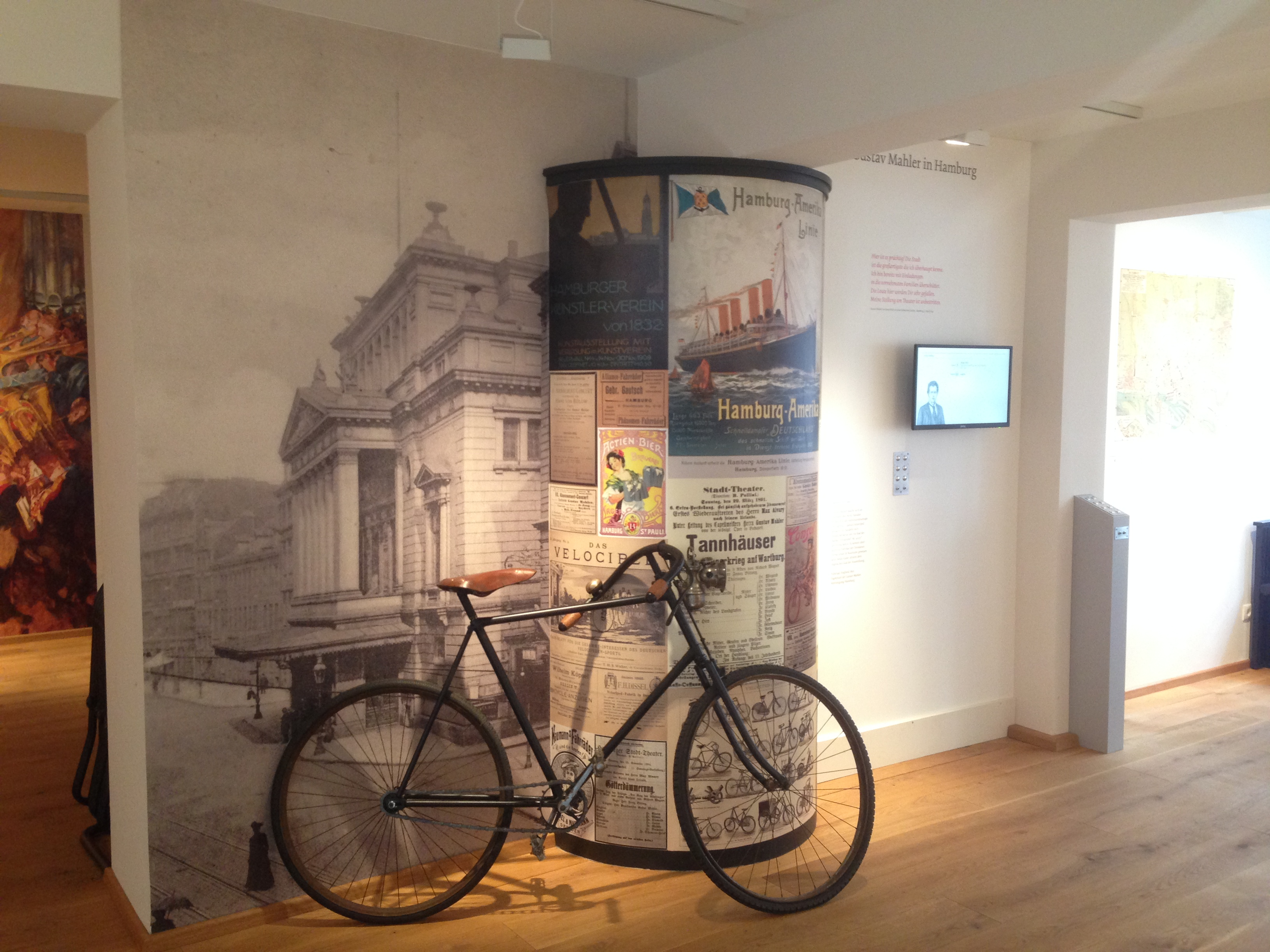

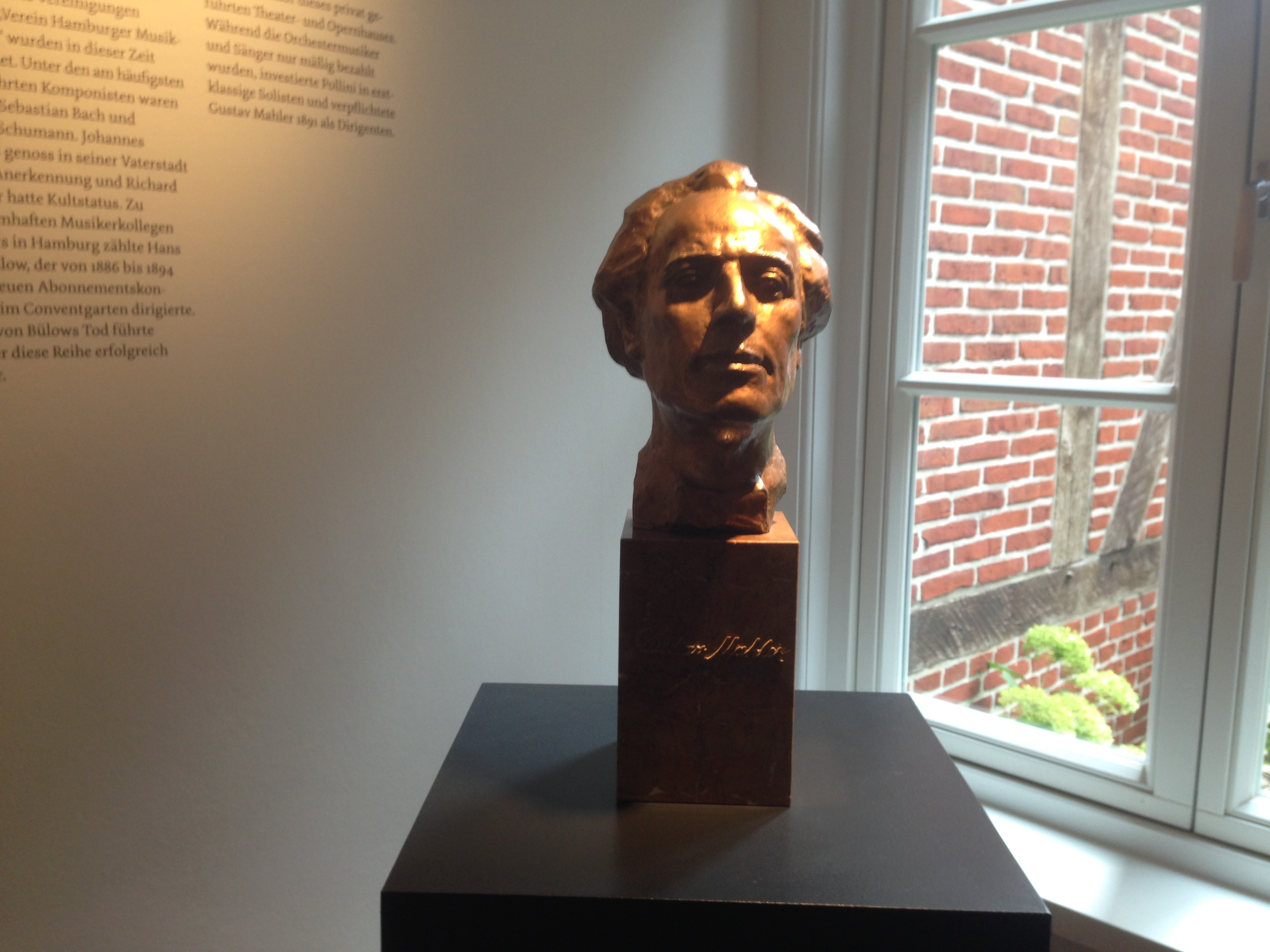

== See also ==
- List of museums in Germany
- List of music museums
