= Fanny & Felix Mendelssohn Museum =

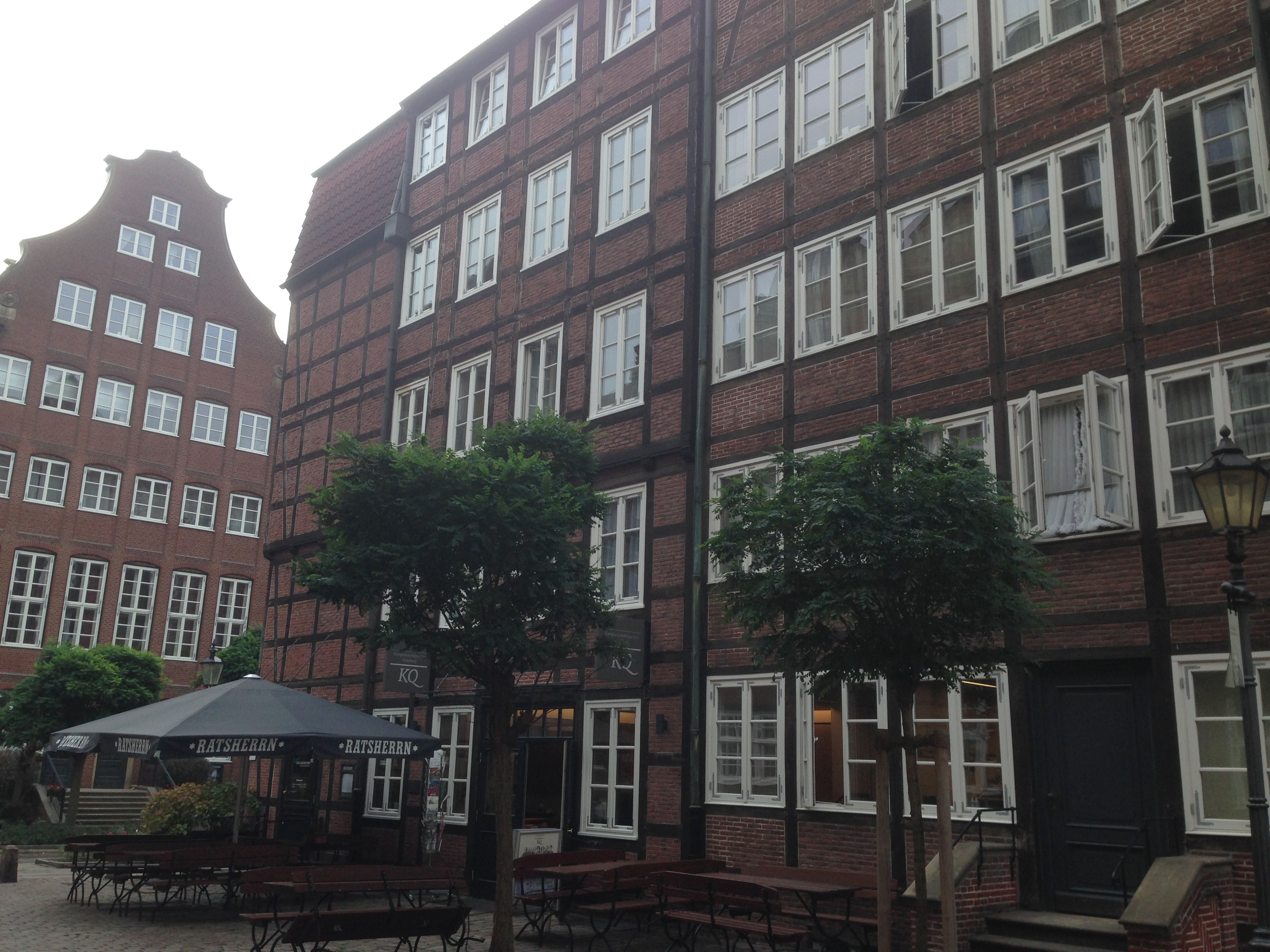
- entrance of the museum

- Location within Hamburg Location within Germany
- Established: 29 May 2018
- Location: Peterstraße 29, Neustadt, Hamburg, Germany
- Coordinates: 53°33′4.46″N 9°58′35.57″E
- Type: biographical museum
- Collections: about Felix and Fanny Mendelssohn
- Curator: dr. Alexander Odefey
- Historian: Beatrix Borchard
- Website: www.komponistenquartier.de/die-museen/fanny-and-felix-mendelssohn-museum/

The Fanny & Felix Mendelssohn Museum is a museum in the Composers Quarter in the Neustadt district of Hamburg, Germany. It is dedicated to the classical composers and siblings Fanny and Felix Mendelssohn. It opened on 29 May 2018.

The museum focuses on their lives, including their childhood and the circumstances in which people of Jewish descent lived and worked within the German culture of the time. In her lifetime, Fanny (1805–1847) wrote the compositions of more than four hundred songs. Felix (1809–1847) was younger than her and had composed since he was an adolescent. Their mother taught them to play the piano in their early years, but composers including Ludwig Berger, Marie Bigot and Carl Friedrich Zelter later took over the role. The siblings also inspired each other.

In the center, a forte piano symbolizes making music, to which Fanny and Felix were dedicated throughout their lives. Multimedia techniques are used, which enable visitors to go into detail on certain subjects. Visitors can learn how the siblings composed their work and listen to their music. On passing by detection devices audio recordings are activated. The museum opted for a scientifically justified presentation. The musicologist Beatrix Borchard was involved in the museum's planning.

Construction work delayed the opening by a year. When the museum was opened, the second construction phase had not yet been fully completed. At that time, the audio points, touch pads and several display cabinets were still not ready. The limited existence of original pieces was attended to when the museum was fitted out.

== Gallery ==
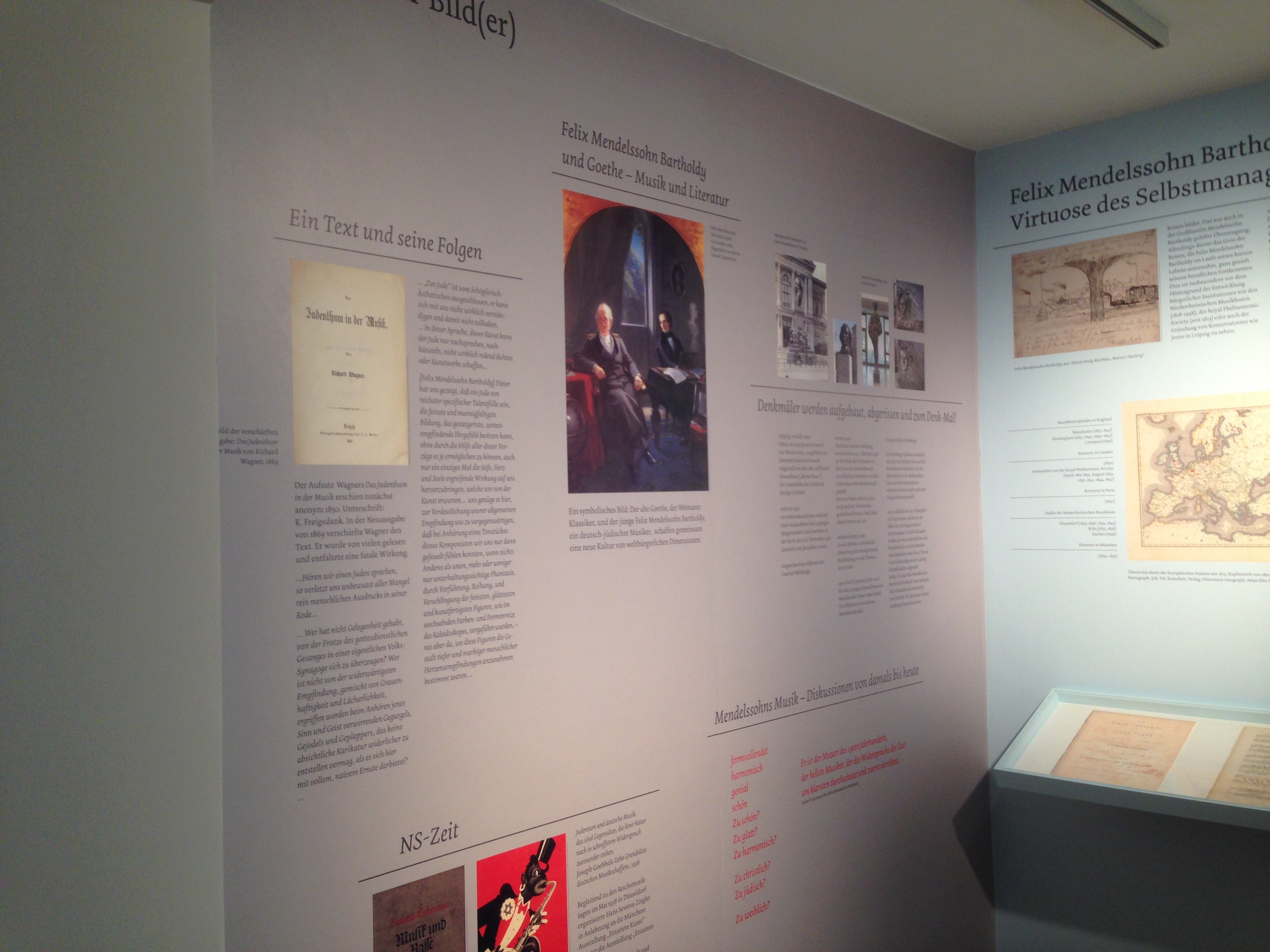

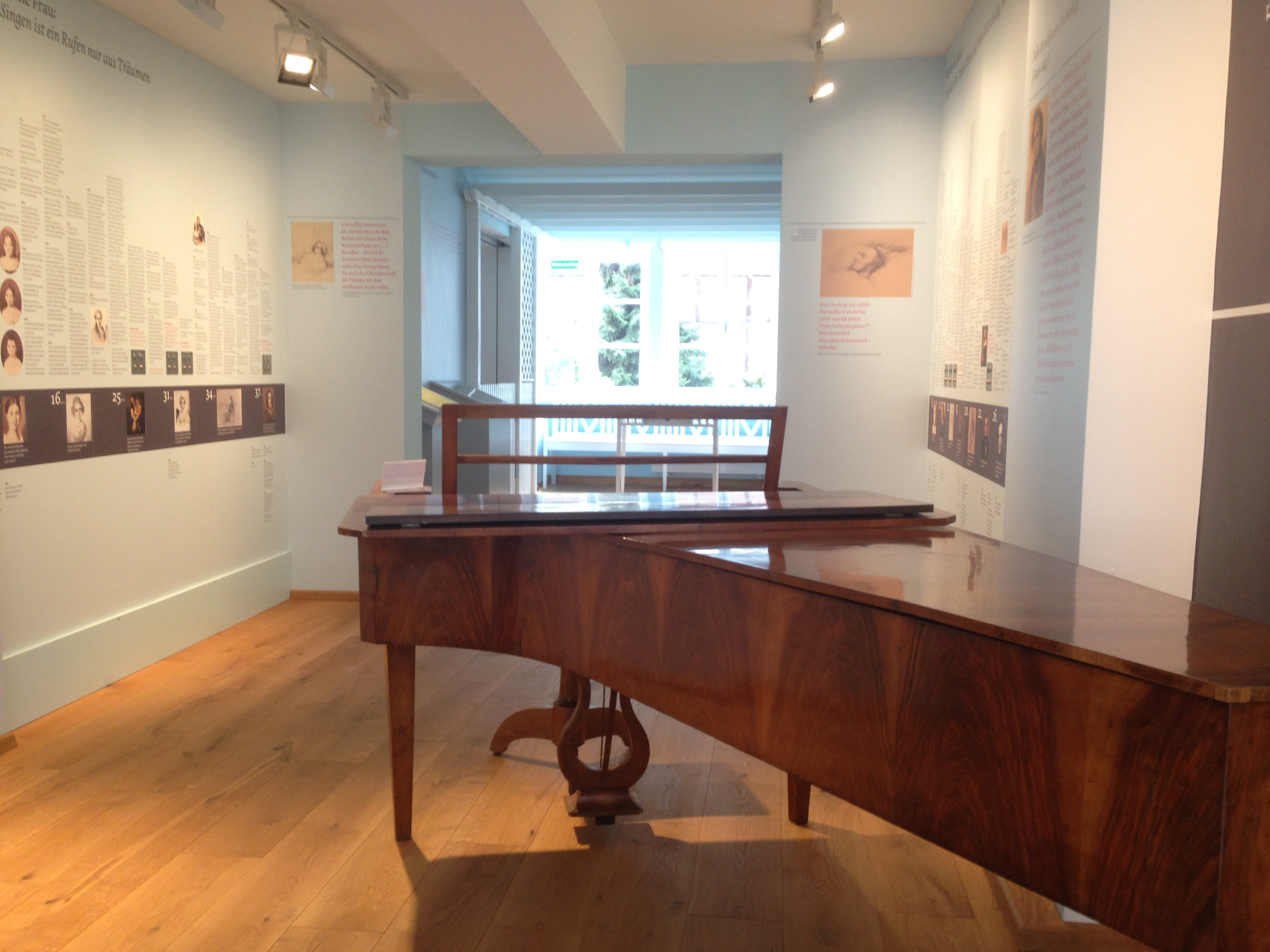

== See also ==
- List of museums in Germany
- List of music museums
