= Carl Philipp Emanuel Bach Museum =

Carl Philipp Emanuel Bach Museum CPE Bach-Museum
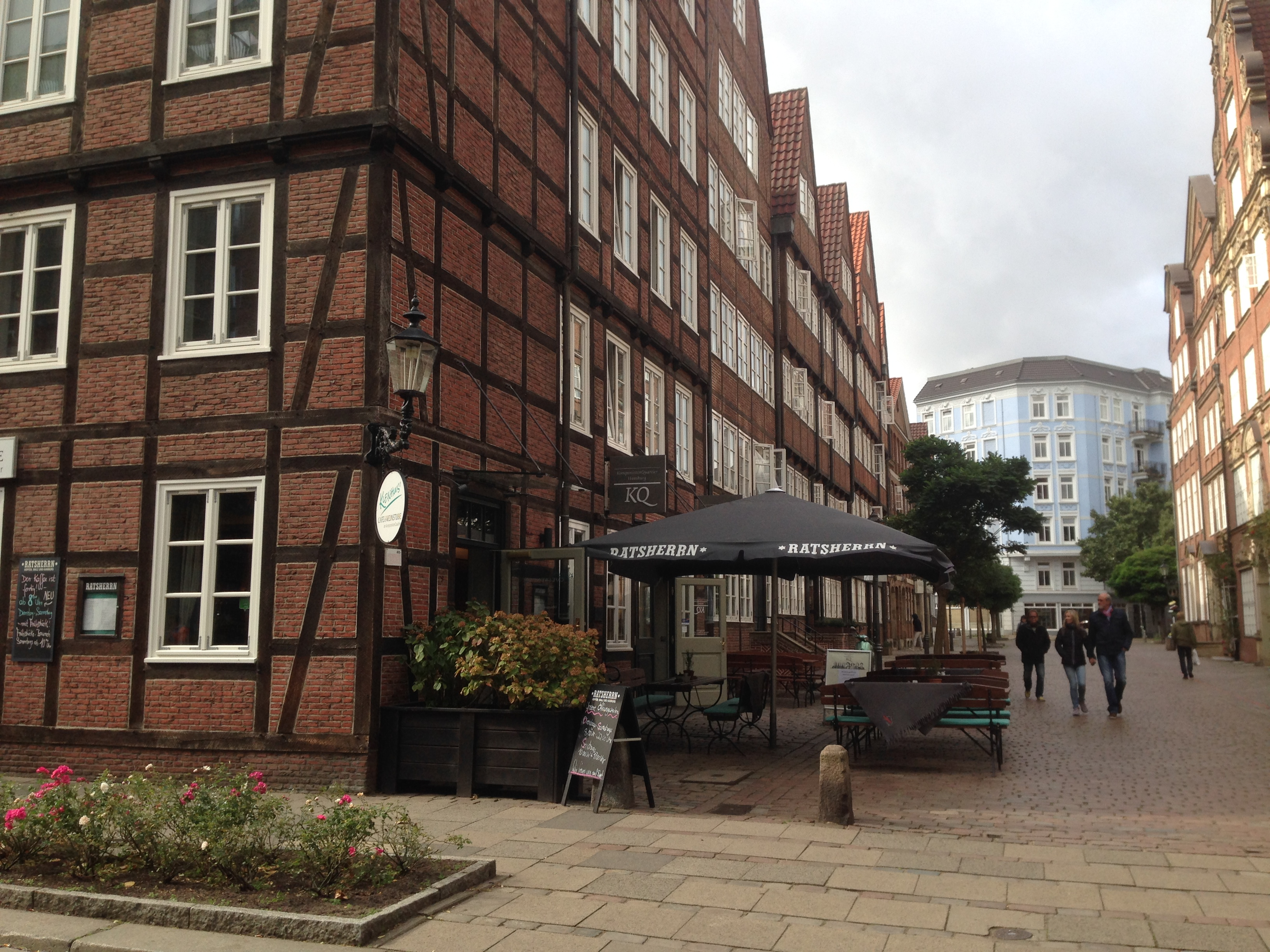
- entrance of the museum

- Location within Hamburg Location within Germany
- Established: 18 March 2015
- Location: Peterstraße 29, Hamburg-Neustadt
- Coordinates: 53°33′4.46″N 9°58′35.57″E
- Type: biographical museum
- Collections: about Carl Philipp Emanuel Bach
- Curator: dr. Alexander Odefey
- Website: komponistenquartier.de/die-museen/carl-philipp-emanuel-bach-museum/

The Carl Philipp Emanuel Bach Museum, also called the CPE Bach-Museum, is a museum in the Composers Quarter in Hamburg-Neustadt, Germany. It gives an impression of the work and life of the classical composer Carl Philipp Emanuel Bach. The museum was inaugurated on 18 March 2015 and is accessible for wheelchair users.

The museum gives insight in the environment Bach grew up. Musically he was the most gifted and known child of the five children of Johann Sebastian Bach. In Hamburg he succeeded Georg Philipp Telemann as the curator and music director of the five main churches of the city. During two decades he sojourned in the musical life here, from 1768 to 1788.

He left behind a great number of compositions, and held around 200 performances a year. At audio stations in the museum his music can be listened to. Information is given on the particularities of his music and the influence it had on the society in his time. Visitors can have a virtual tour through Hamburg in which they are confided a conversation between Bach and the contemporary music historian Charles Burney.

For an authentic appearance, some furniture was rebuilt with the characteristics from Bachs era. At the center of the museum one finds a clavichord, the favorite instrument of Bach. He was admired for his play on this instrument.

== Impression ==
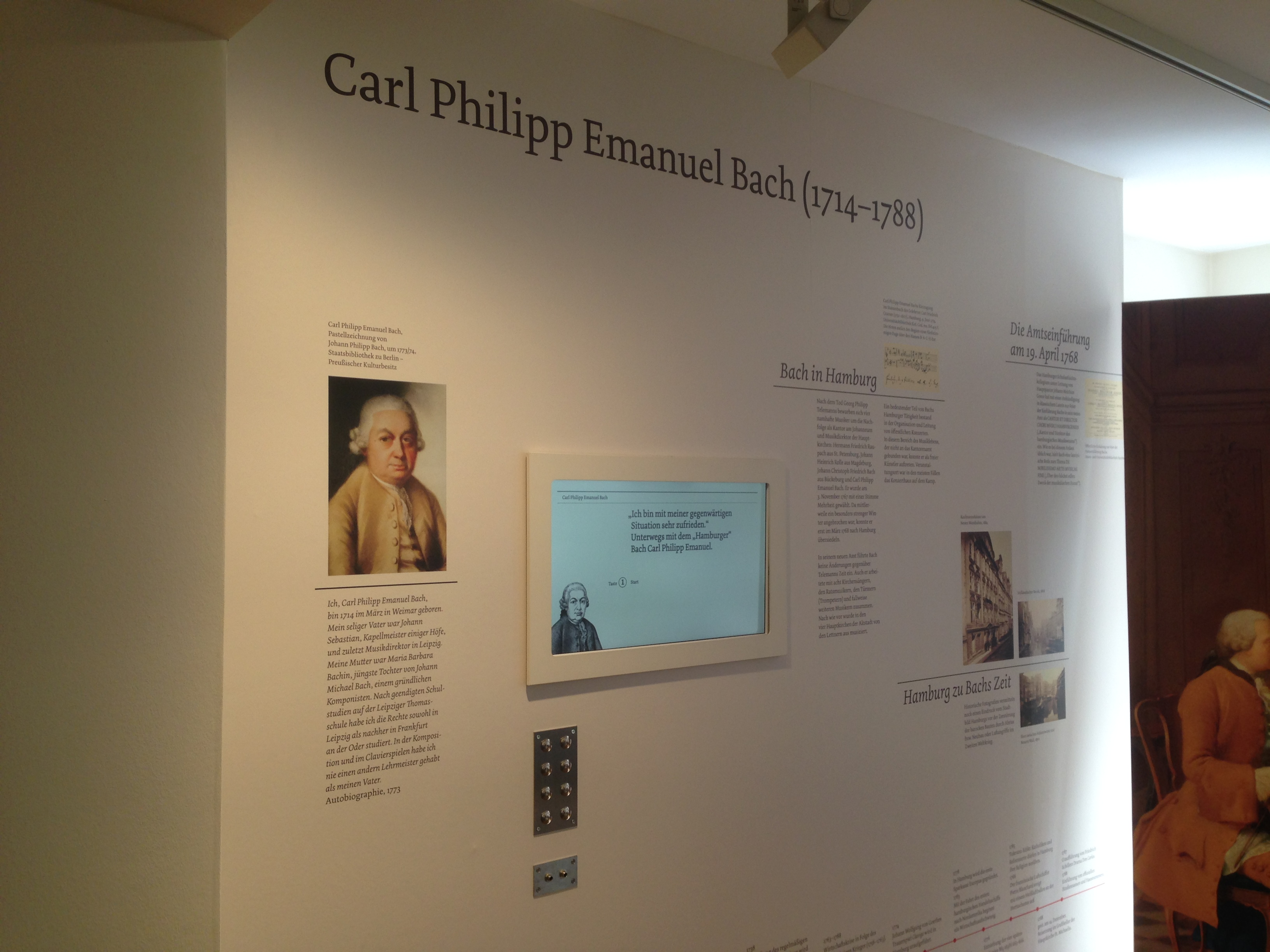

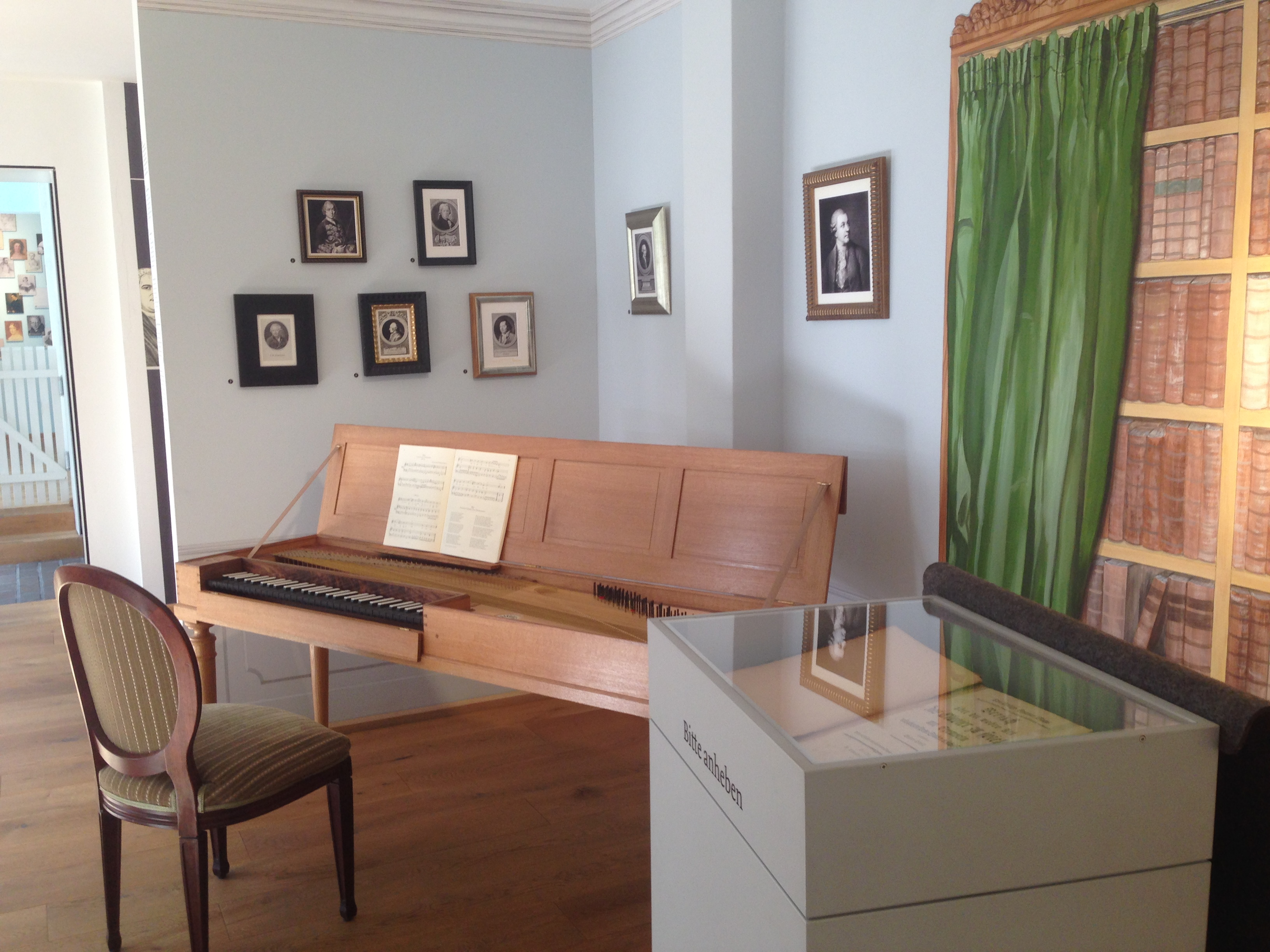

== See also ==
- List of museums in Germany
- List of music museums
