= Johann Adolph Hasse =

German composer, singer and teacher (1699–1783)

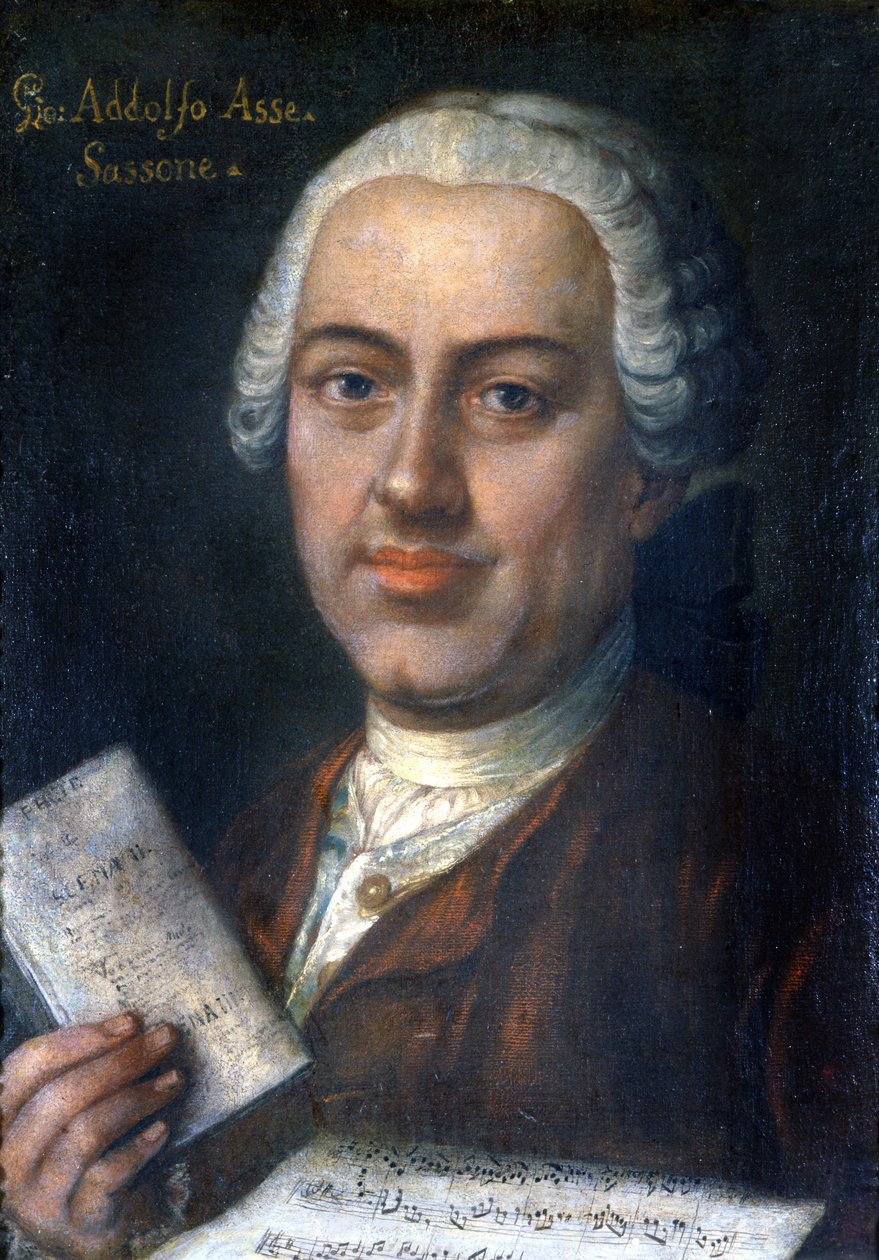
- Portrait of Hasse, 18th-century
- Born: Bergedorf near Hamburg, Holy Roman Empire
- Baptized: 25 March 1699
- Died: 16 December 1783 (aged 84); Venice, Republic of Venice
- Era: Baroque
- Spouse: Faustina Bordoni

Johann Adolph Hasse (baptised 25 March 1699 – 16 December 1783) (Note: Hasse italianized his name as 'Giovanni Adolfo', which lead to the alternative spelling 'Adolf'.) was an 18th-century German composer, singer and teacher of music. Immensely popular in his time, Hasse was best known for his prolific operatic output, though he also composed a considerable quantity of sacred music. Married to soprano Faustina Bordoni and a friend of librettist Pietro Metastasio, whose libretti he frequently set, Hasse was a pivotal figure in the development of opera seria and 18th-century music.

== Early career ==
Hasse was baptised in Bergedorf near Hamburg where his family had been church organists for three generations. His career began in singing when he joined the Hamburg Oper am Gänsemarkt in 1718 as a tenor. In 1719, he obtained a singing post at the court of Brunswick, where in 1721, his first opera, Antioco, was performed; Hasse himself sang in the production.

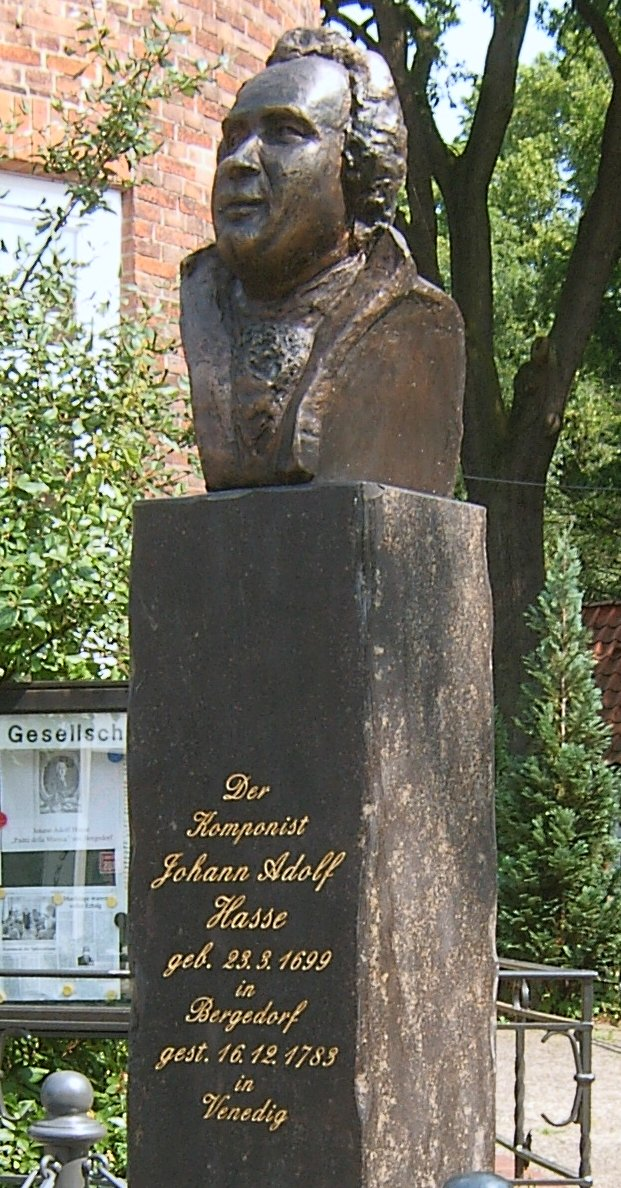
Memorial to Hasse in front of his birth house in Hamburg-Bergedorf

He is thought to have left Germany during 1722. During the 1720s, he lived mostly in Naples, dwelling there for six or seven years. In 1725, his serenata Antonio e Cleopatra, was performed at Naples; the principal roles were sung by Carlo Broschi, better known as Farinelli, and Vittoria Tesi. The success of this work not only earned Hasse many commissions from Naples's opera houses, but also, according to Johann Joachim Quantz, brought him into contact with Alessandro Scarlatti, who became his teacher and friend; Hasse also altered his style in several respects to reflect that of Scarlatti.

Hasse's popularity in Naples increased dramatically and for several years his workload kept him extremely busy. In this period he composed his only full opera buffa, La sorella amante, in addition to several intermezzi and serenatas. He visited the Venetian Carnival of 1730, where his opera Artaserse was performed at S Giovanni Grisostomo. Metastasio's libretto was heavily reworked for the occasion, and Farinelli took a leading role. Two of his arias from this opera he later performed every night for a decade for Philip V of Spain.

== Dresden and Venice ==
In 1730, Hasse married Faustina Bordoni, and was also appointed Kapellmeister at the Dresden court, though he did not arrive at Dresden until July 1731; earlier in the year, he had been active at Vienna, supervising a performance of his oratorio Daniello at the court of the Habsburgs. Soon after the couple's arrival in Dresden, Faustina performed before the court. In September, Hasse's Cleofide (set to a highly adapted Metastasio text) was given its premiere; it seems possible that J. S. Bach and his eldest son Wilhelm Friedemann Bach attended the performance; certainly C. P. E. Bach claimed that Hasse and his father had become good friends around this time. King Augustus II the Strong of Poland and Saxony granted him the title of the Royal-Polish and Electoral-Saxon Kapellmeister.

In October, Hasse left Dresden to direct premieres of his next operas at Turin and Rome, and he also wrote music for the Venetian theatres at this time. By late 1732, Hasse was in Naples again, though he spent the winter at Venice where his Siroe was first performed in particularly lavish style. In February 1733, Augustus II the Strong, Hasse's early royal patron at Dresden, died. As the court went into a year of mourning, Hasse was permitted to remain abroad. Many of his sacred works, composed for Venice's churches, date to this time.

For much of 1734, Hasse was at Dresden, but from 1735 until 1737, he was in Italy, largely at Naples. Faustina performed in the September 1735 premiere of Tito Vespasiano (another adapted Metastasio libretto) at Pesaro. Returning to the royal court in Dresden, during 1737, Hasse composed five new operas, but when the court moved to Poland in the autumn of 1738, he and Faustina came back to Venice, where both of them were extremely popular. His next stay in Dresden was also his longest, between the first months of 1740 and January 1744. In this time, he revised Artaserse, composing new arias for Faustina, and also wrote a couple of original intermezzi. His general avoidance of comic opera seems to have been due to Faustina, who feared that the style of singing demanded by opera buffa would damage her voice.

== Dresden: 1744–1763 ==
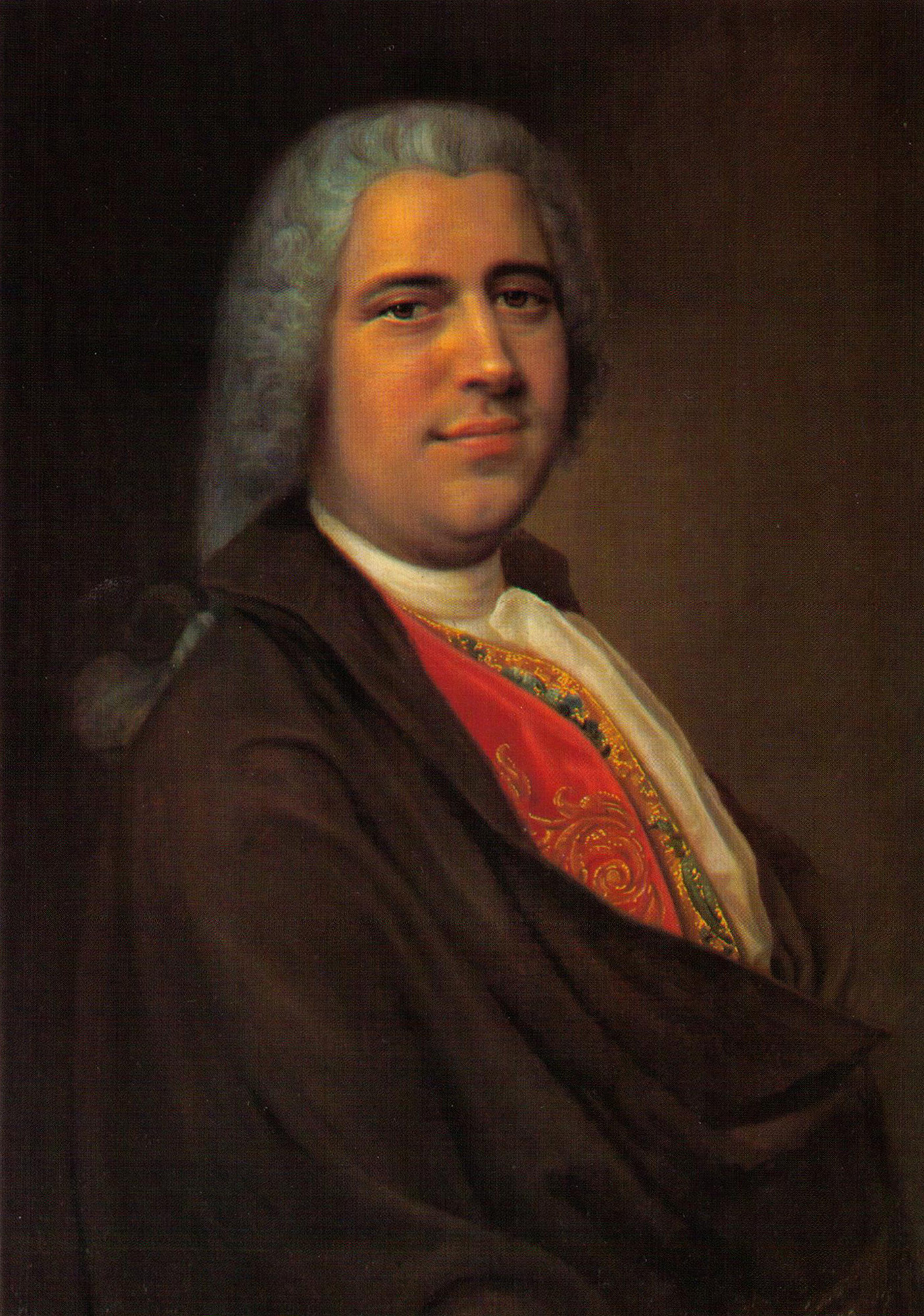
Hasse in 1740, painted by Balthasar Denner

Between the winter of 1744 and late summer 1745, Hasse was in Italy, but then returned to Dresden for a year. Frederick the Great, a keen flute player, visited the court in December 1745, and it is likely that many of Hasse's flute sonatas and concertos that date to this time were written for Frederick. The King of Prussia was also present at a performance of one of Hasse's Te Deums, and himself ordered a performance of the composer's opera Arminio. Soon after Hasse visited Venice and Munich, returning to Dresden in June 1747 to stage his opera La spartana generosa, performed to celebrate multiple royal weddings at this time. Also at this time the hierarchy at Dresden was restructured; Nicola Porpora was named Kapellmeister, while Hasse himself was promoted to Oberkapellmeister.

In 1748, Hasse performed two of his operas, Ezio and Artaserse, in Bayreuth in the half finished Markgräfliches Opernhaus, because of the marriage of Elisabeth Fredericka Sophie of Brandenburg-Bayreuth, the daughter of Wilhelmine of Bayreuth. The marriage of princess Maria Josepha of Saxony to the French Dauphin gave Hasse the opportunity to journey to Paris in the summer of 1750, where his Didone abbandonata was performed.

On 28 March 1750, Hasse presented his last oratorio La conversione di Sant' Agostino in the chapel of the royal palace in Dresden. The libretto, penned by the Dresden Electress Maria Antonia Walpurgis (1724–1780), concerns the conversion of a sinner to sainthood and was modeled after and edited by Metastasio. The Dresden premiere was followed by numerous performances of the work in Leipzig, Hamburg, Mannheim, Padua, Rome, Riga, Prague, Potsdam and Berlin which is a testament to the work's popularity in the latter half of the 18th century.

The 1751 Carnival in Dresden saw the retirement of Faustina from operatic performance. Hasse continued to produce new operas throughout the decade, including a setting of Metastasio's Il re pastore, a text later used by Mozart. In 1756, the Seven Years' War compelled the court at Dresden to move to Warsaw, though Hasse himself lived mostly in Italy, travelling to Poland solely to supervise productions of his operas, if at all. In the autumn of 1760, he moved to Vienna, where he stayed for the next two years, returning to Dresden in 1763 to find much of his home destroyed and the musical apparatus of the court opera wrecked. Hasse's main patron at Dresden, king Augustus III of Poland and Saxony died soon after and his successor, who also died quickly, deemed elaborate musical events at the court superfluous. Hasse and Faustina were paid two years' salary but given no pension.

== Vienna and Venice: last years ==
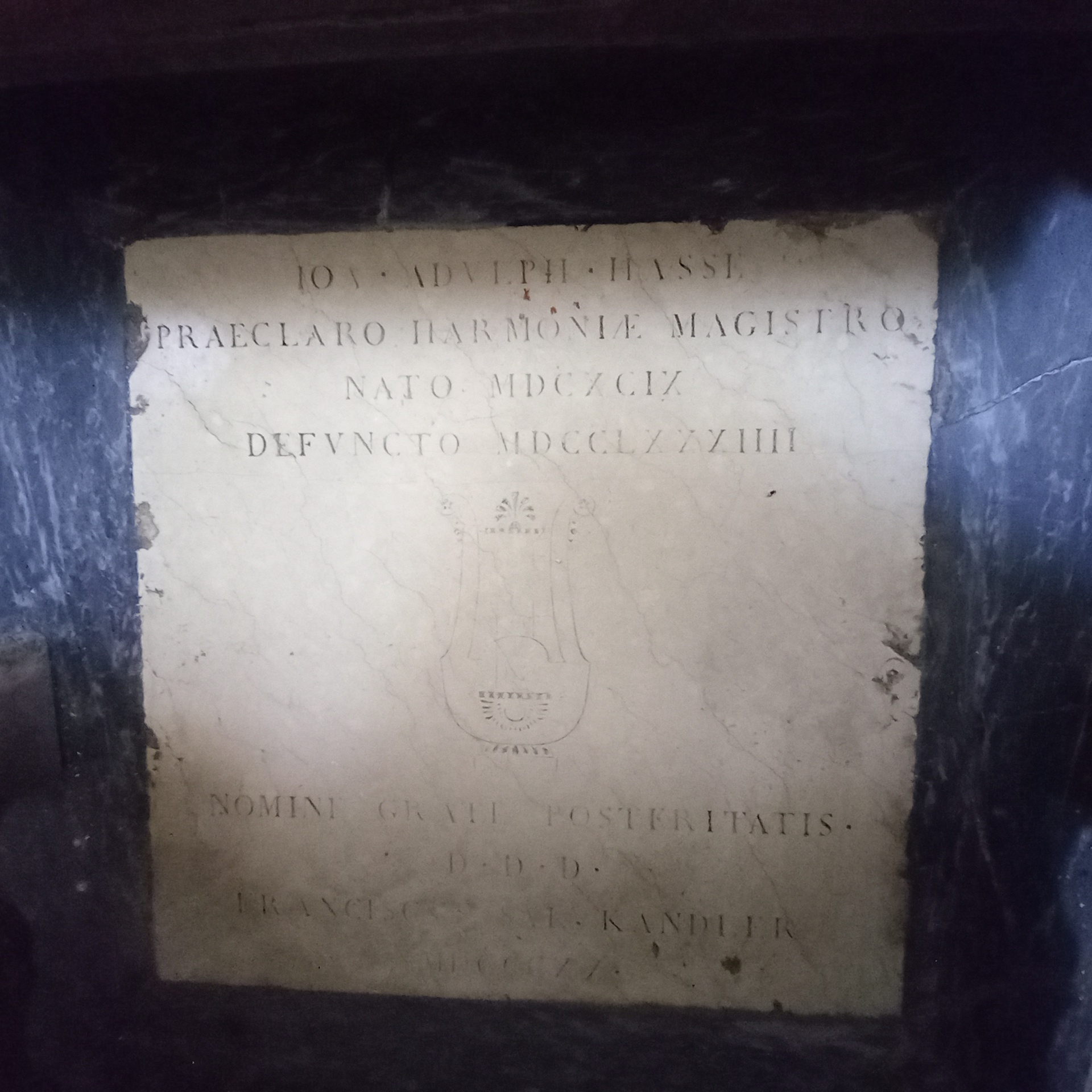
The grave of Hasse in the church of San Marcuola in Venice.

In 1764, Hasse travelled to Vienna, where the coronation of Joseph II was marked by a performance of his festa teatrale Egeria, again set to a libretto by Metastasio. For the most part, he remained at Vienna until 1773. Mozart was present at a performance of his Partenope in September 1767. Most of his operas composed during this period were also successfully produced at Naples. He was the favourite of Maria Theresa, and it can be argued that he took up the job of de facto court Kapellmeister. With the premiere of Piramo e Tisbe (September 1768) Hasse had intended to retire from opera but was compelled by Maria Theresa to compose a further work, Ruggiero (1771), again set to a Metastasian libretto. In 1771, when hearing 15-year-old Mozart's opera Ascanio in Alba, Hasse is reported to have made the prophetic remark: "This boy will cause us all to be forgotten."

At this time, operatic style was undergoing significant change, and the model of opera seria that Hasse and Metastasio had settled found itself assailed by the threat of the reforms of Christoph Willibald Gluck and Ranieri de' Calzabigi, as laid down in the music and libretto for Gluck's opera Orfeo ed Euridice. Charles Burney, visiting Vienna in 1773, reported on the debate.

Party runs as high among poets, musicians and their adherents, at Vienna as elsewhere. Metastasio and Hasse, may be said, to be at the head of one of the principal sects; and Calsabigi and Gluck of another. The first, regarding all innovations as quackery, adhere to the ancient form of the musical drama, in which the poet and musician claim equal attention from an audience; the bard in the recitatives and narrative parts; and the composer in the airs, duos and choruses. The second party depend more on theatrical effects, propriety of character, simplicity of diction, and of musical execution, than on, what they style flowery description, superfluous similes, sententious and cold morality, on one side, with tiresome symphonies, and long divisions, on the other.

Finding his music under siege from an avant-garde surge in a new direction, Hasse left Vienna in 1773 and spent the final ten years of his life in Venice, teaching and composing sacred works. Faustina died in November 1781, and Hasse himself, after a long period of suffering from arthritis, just over two years later. He was almost completely ignored after his death, until F. S. Kandler paid for his gravestone in Venice, where he is buried in San Marcuola, and authored a biography of Hasse in 1820.

== Relationship with Metastasio ==
Hasse's friendship with Metastasio, and his appreciation of the art form the librettist had created, increased over the years. The early Metastasio texts he set were all greatly altered for the purpose, but Frederick the Great and Francesco Algarotti both exerted influence in order to make Hasse pay greater respect to Metastasio's works. In the early 1740s, he began setting new Metastasian libretti unadapted, and his personal relations with the librettist also improved significantly at around this time. In one of his letters, dated to March 1744, Metastasio made the following comments:

...never until now had I happened to see him [Hasse] in all his glory, but always detached from his many personal relationships in such a way that he was like an aria without instruments; but now I see him as a father, husband and friend, qualities which make an admirable union in him with those solid bases of ability and good behaviour, for which I will cherish him so many years...

In the following years, Hasse reset his earlier works based on Metastasio's texts, this time paying great attention to the poet's original intention, and during the 1760s, as Metastasio wrote new texts, Hasse was, as a general rule, the first composer to set them. Burney left the following note:

This poet and musician are the two halves of what, like Plato's Androgyne, once constituted a whole; for as they are equally possessed of the same characteristic marks of true genius, taste, and judgement; so propriety, consistency, clearness, and precision, are alike the inseparable companions of both...

== Style and reputation ==
Despite Giovanni Battista Mancini's claim that Hasse was the padre della musica, and despite the composer's massive popularity as a figure at the very forefront of 18th-century serious Italian opera, after his death Hasse's reputation vastly declined and his music lay mostly unperformed (with the exception of some of his sacred works, which were revived now and again in Germany). In particular, his operas sank without trace and revival only began as the 20th century approached its end: Gluck's reforms took opera away from Hasse's style and Metastasio's Arcadian ideals to a new direction from which it would not return.

In his day, Hasse's style was noted primarily for his lyricism and sense of melody. Burney put it this way:

[Hasse] may without injury to his brethren, be allowed to be as superior to all other lyric composers, as Metastasio is to all other lyric poets.

Careful choice of key was also a crucial factor in Hasse's style, with certain emotions usually marked out by certain key choices. Amorous feelings were expressed by A, for instance, while for expressions of aristocratic nobility Hasse used C and B flat; on the other hand, his supernatural and fear-inducing music usually went into the keys of C and F minor. Most of his arias begin in the major, switching only to minor for the B section before returning to major for the da capo. As his career developed his arias grew much longer but a lyrical sense was still his overriding target.

In Hamburg, the Johann Adolph Hasse Museum is dedicated to his life and work.

== Notes and references ==
Notes

Sources

- Hansell, Sven (2001). "Hasse, Johann Adolf [Adolph]". Grove Music Online (8th ed.). Oxford University Press. doi:10.1093/omo/9781561592630.013.90000380289. ISBN 978-1-56159-263-0. (subscription, Wikilibrary access, or UK public library membership required)
