= List of museums in Belgium =

This is a list of museums located in Belgium.

== Alken ==
- Zoe was Alleke

== Antwerp ==
- DIVA Museum for Diamonds, Jewellery and Silver
- EcoHuis
- Etnographic Museum
- Fotomuseum
- Royal Museum of Fine Arts (KMSKA)
- Museum of Modern Art Antwerp (MuHKA)
- Plantin-Moretus Museum
- Museum aan de Stroom (MAS; Museum at the current)
  - Volkskundemuseum
  - National Maritime Museum
- Maagdenhuismuseum (Virgin House Museum)
- Middelheim Museum
- ModeMuseum (Fashion Museum)
- Rubenshuis (Rubens House)
- Rockox House
- Mayer van den Bergh Museum
- Museum Vleeshuis

== Beveren ==
- Organ collection Ghysels, Kallo

== Boussu ==
- Grand Hornu, Hornu

== Bruges ==
- Groeningemuseum
- Diamantmuseum Brugge

== Brussels ==
- Belgian Centre for Comic Strip Art
- BELvue Museum
- Horta Museum
- Magritte Museum
- Musical Instrument Museum
- Royal Museum of the Armed Forces and of Military History
- Royal Museums of Art and History
- Royal Museums of Fine Arts of Belgium
- Royal Belgian Institute of Natural Sciences

== Deinze ==
- Museum van Deinze en de Leiestreek

== Dendermonde ==
- Jazz Center Flanders

== Dilbeek ==
- Tramsite Schepdaal

== Dinant ==
- Mr Sax's House

== Engis ==
- Gourmet Library and museum, Hermalle-sous-Huy

== Essen ==
- Karrenmuseum

== Genk ==
- Bokrijk Open-Air Museum

== Ghent ==
- Museum of Fine Arts
- Stedelijk Museum voor Actuele Kunst (SMAK)
- Design museum Gent
- Museum of Industry
- Ghent University Museum
- Ghent City Museum
- Huis van Alijn

== Grimbergen ==
- Museum for Old Techniques (MOT)

== Halle ==
- South-West Brabant Museum
- Den Ast

== Harelbeke ==
- Peter Benoit Huis

== Hasselt ==
- Art Museum Z33
- Modemuseum Hasselt
- Jenevermuseum

== Herentals ==
- Hidrodoe

== Kampenhout ==
- Brabant Center for Music Traditions

== Knokke-Heist ==
- HEY Museum

== Koksijde ==
- Paul Delvaux Museum

== Kruishoutem ==
- SONS Museum

== Leuven ==
- M - Museum Leuven

== Libin ==
- Euro Space Center

== Liège ==
- Curtius Museum
- Ansembourg Museum
- Archéoforum

== Lier ==
- Stedelijk Museum Wuyts-Van Campen en Baron Caroly

== Louvain-la-Neuve ==
- Musée Hergé
- Musée L

== Mechelen ==
- Jewish Museum of Deportation and Resistance
- Technopolis
- Toy Museum

== Mons ==
- Museum François Duesberg
- Beaux-Arts Mons
- Maison Van Gogh

== Morlanwelz ==
- Musée royal de Mariemont

== Namur ==
- NAM-IP
- MusAfrica Namur

== Ostend ==
- Atlantic Wall open-air museum

== Peer ==
- Armand Preud'homme Museum (1990-2018)

== Tellin ==
- Bell and Carillon Museum (1992–2013)

== Tervuren ==
- Royal Museum for Central Africa

== Thuin ==
- ASVi museum

== Tongeren ==
- Gallo-Roman Museum

== Tournai ==
- Musée des Beaux-Arts

== Tremelo ==
- Damiaanmuseum

== Willebroek ==
- Harmonium Art museuM

== Ypres ==
- In Flanders Fields Museum

== Zottegem ==
- Egmont Museum
- Archaeological museum of Velzeke
