= Stedelijk Museum (disambiguation) =

Stedelijk Museum ('city museum') most often refers to Stedelijk Museum Amsterdam, in the Netherlands.

Stedelijk Museum may also refer to:

== In Belgium ==
- Stedelijk Museum voor Actuele Kunst, Ghent
- Stedelijk Museum "Peter Benoit", Harelbeke
- Stedelijk Museum Wuyts-Van Campen en Baron Caroly, Lier

== In the Netherlands ==
- Stedelijk Museum Alkmaar
- Stedelijk Museum Bureau Amsterdam, part of Stedelijk Museum Amsterdam
- Stedelijk Museum Breda
- Van Abbemuseum, Eindhoven, formerly Stedelijk Van Abbemuseum
- Stedelijk Museum Kampen
- Stedelijk Museum 's-Hertogenbosch
