= Pieter Brueghel =

Pieter Brueghel may refer to:

- Pieter Brueghel the Elder (c. 1525–1569), Dutch and Flemish Renaissance painter
- Pieter Brueghel the Younger (1564–1638), son of the above, Flemish painter and copyist, also known as "Hell Brueghel"
