= René Haeseryn =

René Haeseryn (1929–2016) was a Belgian philologist, folklorist and terminologist.

== Life ==
Haeseryn was born in Massemen on 29 September 1929. An orphan, he was raised by foster parents. He studied at Ghent University, graduating as a Doctor of Philology in 1962 with a thesis on medieval Flemish onomastics. From 1971 to 1982 he worked at the Folklore Museum in Ghent, while also contributing to seminars on folklore at Ghent University. He also taught at the Higher Institute of Translators and Interpreters in Antwerp (now part of Antwerp University).

Haeseryn joined the Belgian Chamber of Translators, Interpreters and Philologists (now Belgian Chamber of Translators and Interpreters) soon after its founding in 1955, and for decades served as its vice-chair until resigning in 2011. From 1966 to 1993 he served as secretary general of the International Federation of Translators. He was for some years editor in chief of the international translation journal Babel, published by the IFT.

He died in Oostakker on 13 April 2016.

== Publications ==
- Onomastische studie van het Liber Inventarius (1281) van de Sint-Pietersabdij te Gent (Ghent, 1951)
- Bijnamen in de oudste rekening van Aardenburg Ao 1309-1310 (Ghent, 1954)
- Bouwstoffen tot de geschiedenis van de Vlaamse persoonsnamen in de 13de eeuw (Ghent, 1957)
- Oorspronck der Cameren van Rethorycke, Statuten ende Ordonnancien der selve onder den titel Jesus Metter Balsem Bloume (Ghent, 1960)
- De namen van de personen uit Dietse gebieden die in het Liber Inventarius (ao 1281) van de Gentse Sint-Pietersabdij voorkomen: Een naamkundige studie (Ghent, 1962)
- Het volkslied in de belangstelling (Ghent, 1963)
- Landelijke architectuur en vakwerkbouw (Ghent, 1963)
- Landbouwterminologie (Ghent, 1968)
- with Guy Janssens, ABN in restaurant en hotel (Lier, 1969; 2nd edition 1975)
- Eerste en plechtige communie, vroeger en nu (Ghent, 1972)
- Iconografie van het oude Sint-Elisabethbegijnhof te Gent (Ghent, 1972)
- Het Museum voor Volkskunde in het kinderen-Alijnshospies te Gent (Brussels, 1974)
- Internationale bescherming van de folklore (Bruges, 1984)
- Vakterminologie in het Nederlands (Brussels, 1989)
- with Gilbert De Bruycker and Valère F. Vanacker, Correct Nederlands thuis, in winkel en bedrijf (Heule, 1995)
- Cinquante ans de la FIT, 1953-2003 (2003)

== Honours and awards ==
- Pierre-François Caillé medal
- Alexander Pushkin medal
- knight in the Ordre des Arts et des Lettres
