= Resteigne =

- Village
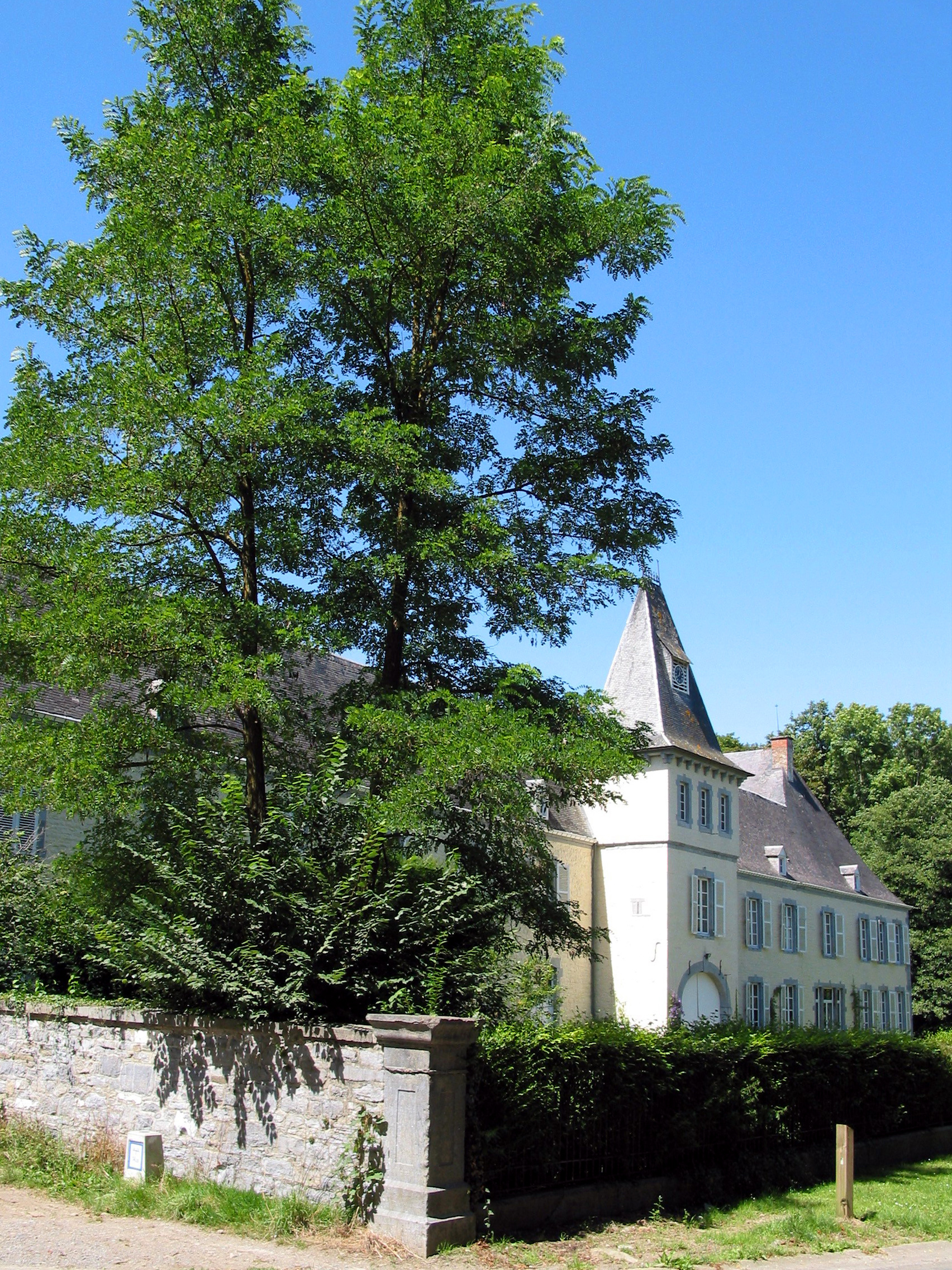

- Coordinates: 50° 5′ N, 5° 11′ E
- Merger with Tellin: 1977

Resteigne (French pronunciation: [ʁɛstɛɲ]; Walloon: Rèstègne) is a village and a sub-municipality of the Belgian municipality of Tellin. Resteigne is located in the province of Luxembourg and was an independent municipality until 1 January 1977.

Location
Region	Wallonia
Province	Luxembourg
Local authority	Tellin
Merger with Tellin	1977
Coordinates	50° 5′ N 5° 11′ E
General
Surface area	15.45 km^{2}
Residents (1/1/2020)	638 (41 inh./km^{2})
Other
Postal Code	6927
NIS code	84068(C)

== See also ==
- Constant-Ernest d'Hoffschmidt
- François d'Hoffschmidt
