= Bell and Carillon Museum =

Clocks and Carillon Museum
- Musée de la Cloche et du Carillon; Klokken- en Beiaardmuseum
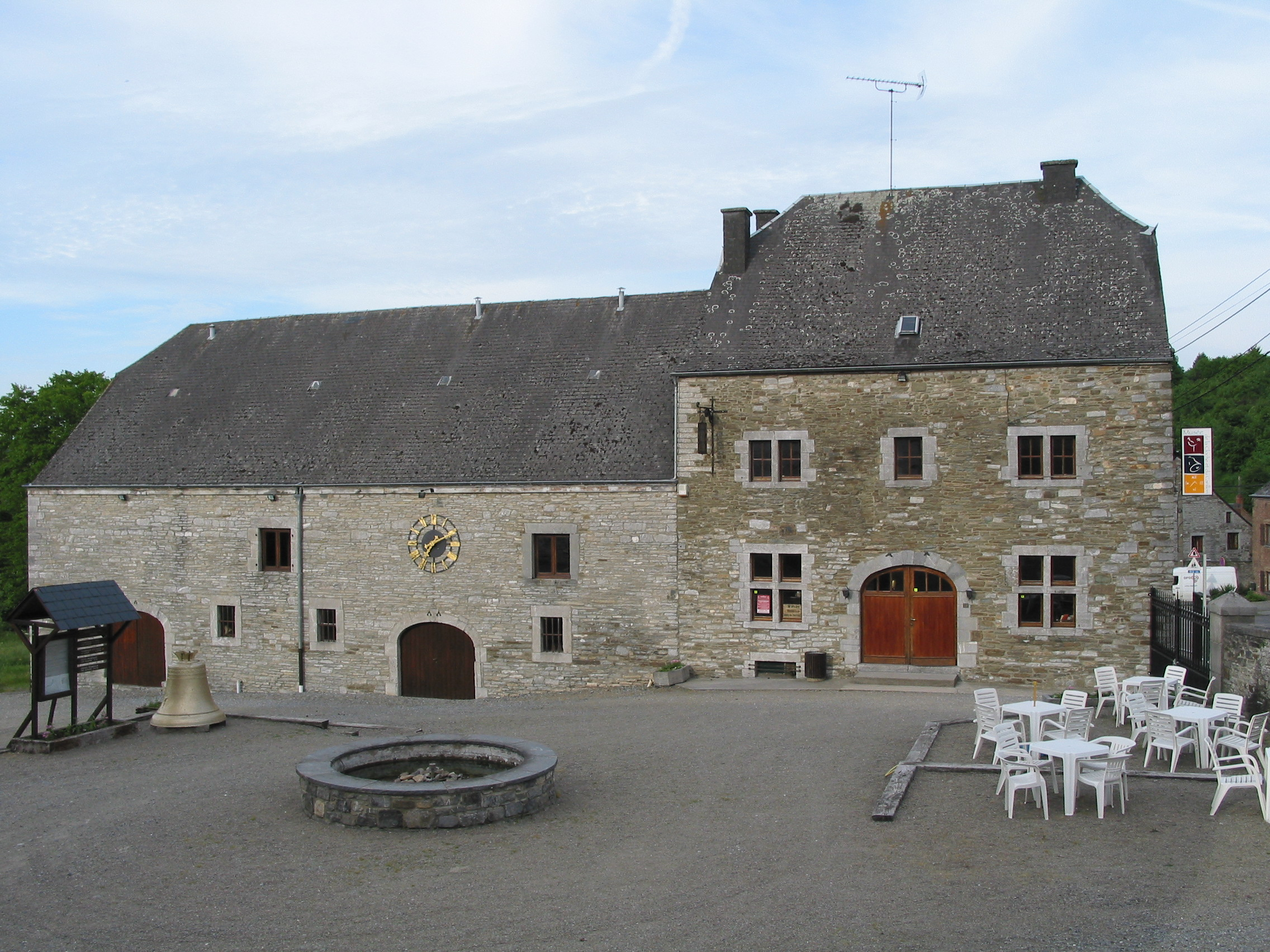
- the museum in 2005

- Location within Belgium
- Established: 1992
- Dissolved: 2013
- Location: Tellin
- Coordinates: 50°4′54.12″N 5°13′10.67″E
- Type: Camponology (Bell) museum
- Owner: municipality of Tellin
- Website: www.lafonderiedetellin.be

The Bell and Carillon Museum (French: Musée de la Cloche et du Carillon; Dutch: Klokken- en Beiaardmuseum) was a museum from 1992 to 2013 in Tellin in the Belgian Ardennes.

The museum was established in a bell foundry that was in service between 1830 and 1970. Beside bells and carillons it showed other objects, like weather-vanes that had been on church towers. There was also a documentary film shown on the process of molding.

The exploitation of the museum cost the municipality 35,000 euro on a yearly base. As a result it was decided on 28 February 2013 to close the museum at the end of the year. The year after the museum was obtained by the artisan and clock renovator Olivier Baudri that based its atelier there, with the goal to reopen the museum in the future.

It has since been reopened and usually is open 3 days a week (Wed, Fri, Sat) for a total of 13 hours. It is closed during Winter (Mid November to March)

== Gallery ==
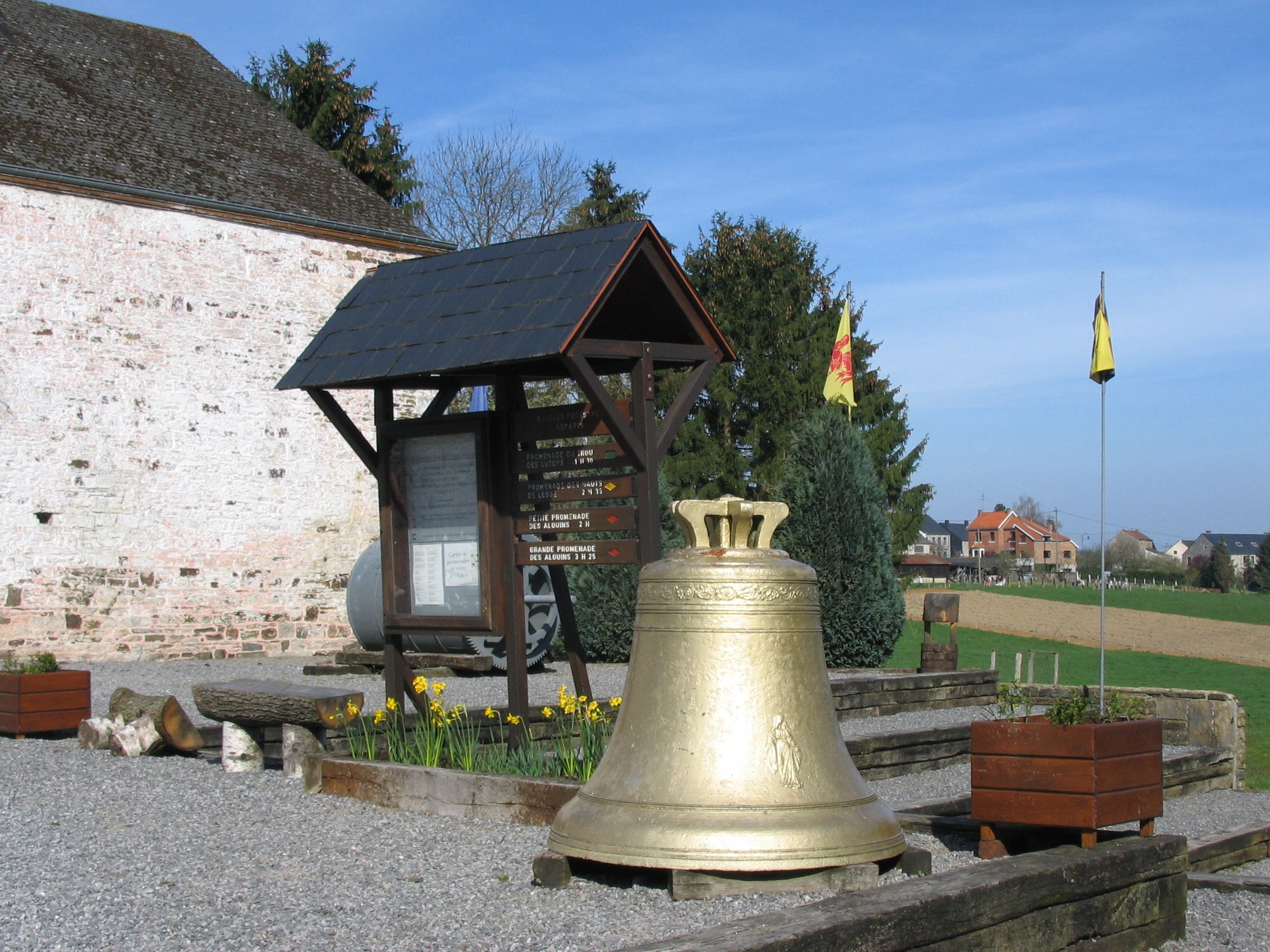

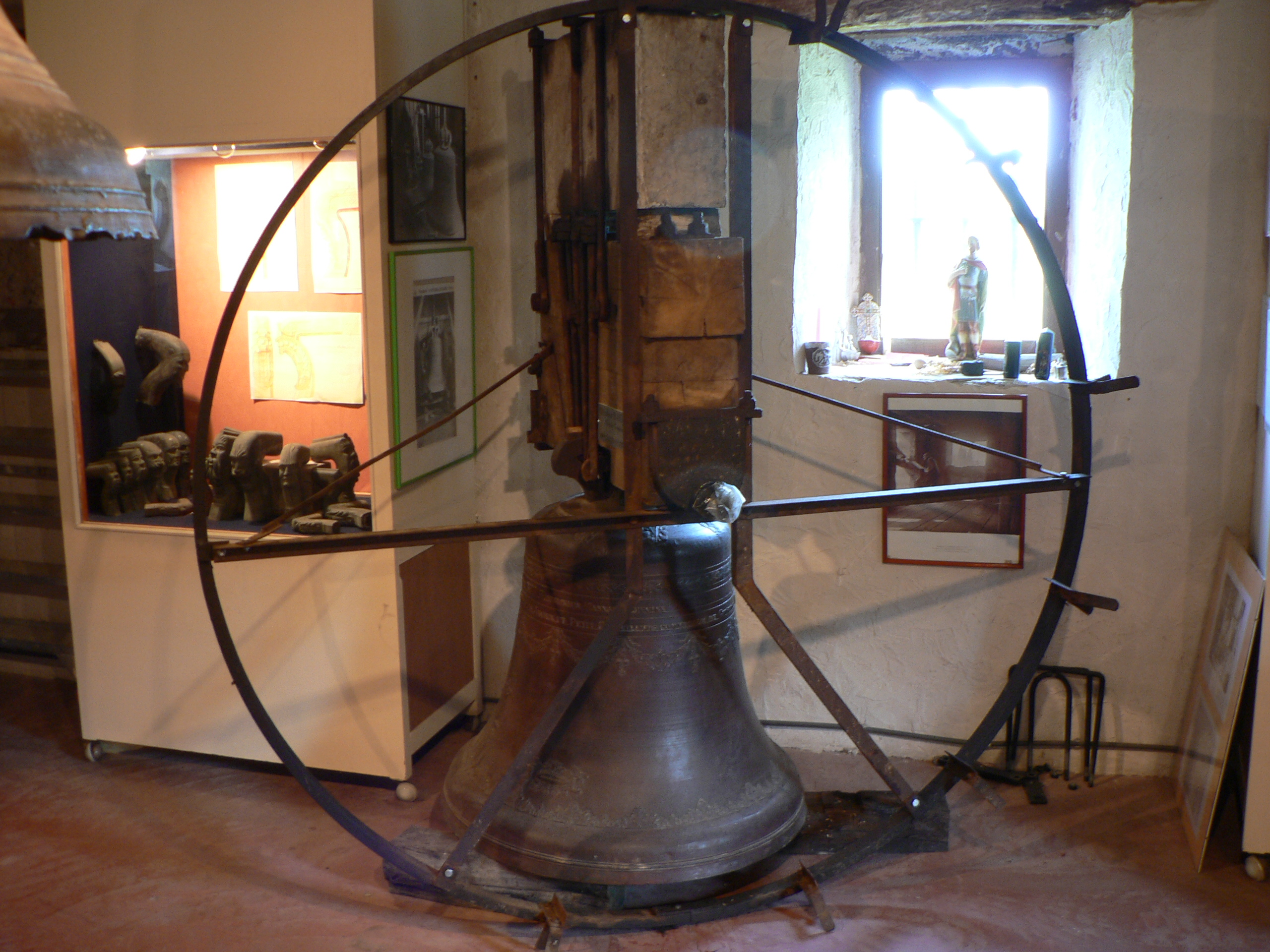

== See also ==
- List of museums in Belgium
- List of music museums
