= List of protected heritage sites in Tellin =

This table shows an overview of the protected heritage sites in the Walloon town Tellin. This list is part of Belgium's national heritage.

| Object | Year/architect | Town/section | Address | Coordinates | Number^{?} | Image |
|---|---|---|---|---|---|---|
| The roof and four walls and gables of the Spanish house Grupont and interior layout, except the outhouse but including adjacent sidewalks and curbs located on public roads ^{(nl)} ^{(fr)} | | Tellin | | 50.092226°N 5.278672°E | 84068-CLT-0002-01 Info | Het dak en de vier gevels en topgevels van het Spaans huis Grupont en het interieur lay-out, met uitzondering van de bijgebouw maar inclusief aangrenzende trottoirs en de stoepranden gelegen op de openbare weg en is een beschermingszone More images |
| Church of Saint Lambert in Bure ^{(nl)} ^{(fr)} | | Tellin | | 50.088808°N 5.259235°E | 84068-CLT-0003-01 Info | |
| The facades and roofs of the rectory of Saint-Lambert in Bure - the monastery wall of the vicarage garden - the wall of the disused cemetery and the ensemble formed by old disused cemetery, the church of Saint-Lambert, the presbytery, its garden and agricultural construction in the latter. ^{(nl)} ^{(fr)} | | Tellin | Bure | 50.088598°N 5.259333°E | 84068-CLT-0004-01 Info | |
| Grasslands and heathlands of the "Tienne Moseray" in ^{(nl)} ^{(fr)} | | Tellin | Resteigne | 50.099170°N 5.170209°E | 84068-CLT-0006-01 Info | |
| Resteigne castle: the facades and roofs ^{(nl)} ^{(fr)} | | Tellin | | 50.090382°N 5.174895°E | 84068-CLT-0009-01 Info | De gevels en daken: More images |
| Stations of the Cross, rue des Croisettes 91 to Grupont ^{(nl)} ^{(fr)} | | Tellin | | 50.089504°N 5.281568°E | 84068-CLT-0010-01 Info | |
| Bell foundry in Tellin ^{(nl)} ^{(fr)} | | Tellin | | 50.079759°N 5.216978°E | 84068-CLT-0011-01 Info | Klokkengieterij te Tellin te savoir More images |

== See also ==
- List of protected heritage sites in Luxembourg (Belgium)
