= Lucien Ceyssens =

Ecclesiastical historian (1902–2001)

Lucianus Ceyssens OFM
- Born: Willem Maria Ceyssens; 8 October 1902; Wijchmaal, Limburg, Belgium
- Died: 10 April 2001 (aged 98); Sint-Truiden, Limburg, Belgium

Academic background
- Thesis: Introduction du formulaire antijanséniste en Belgique. Premier essai (1692-1694) (1936)

Academic work
- Discipline: Historian
- Sub-discipline: Ecclesiastical history

Lucien or Lucianus Ceyssens (1902–2001) was a twentieth-century ecclesiastical historian who specialised in the history of Jansenism.

== Life ==
Ceyssens was born in Wijchmaal, Belgium, on 8 October 1902. In 1921 he entered the Order of St Francis, and in 1927 he was ordained priest.

He followed some history classes at the Catholic University of Louvain in 1929–31, and in 1934 was a student at the Faculty of Church History of the Gregorian University in Rome. From 1934 to 1963 he taught at the Pontifical University Antonianum in Rome, except during the years of the Second World War (1940–1945), when he was in Belgium.

As a historian, he had a marked impact on the modern understanding of the seventeenth-century religious controversies between Jansenists and anti-Jansenists. His sympathies were very much with the Jansenists.

In 1963 a Festschrift was published to mark his 60th birthday, Miscellanea Jansenistica offerts à Lucien Ceyssens, O.F.M., and in 1992 a collection of his own articles was published as Le Sort de la bulle Unigenitus to mark his 90th birthday.

He died at Sint-Truiden, Belgium, on 10 April 2001.

== Works ==
- De Minderbroeders te Turnhout (Campinia sacra 6; Antwerp, 1937).
- Jansenistica: studiën in verband met de geschiedenis van het Jansenisme, 4 vols. (Mechelen, 1950-1962).
- Sources relatives aux débuts du jansénisme et de l'antijansénisme: 1640-1643 (Leuven, 1957)
- "Recherches sur le Jansénisme dans les archives et bibliothèques de l'Europe", Archief- en Bibliotheekwezen in België 43 (1972): 217-235.
- Le Sort de la bulle Unigenitus (Leuven, 1992).

== Studies ==
- M. G. Spiertz, "L'oeuvre du professeur Ceyssens", in L'oeuvre littéraire de Lucien Ceyssens, edited by I. Vázquez (Rome, 1979), pp. 125–137.
- J A. G. Tans, "L'oeuvre scientifique de Lucien Ceyssens", in Autour de l'Unigenitus (Leuven, 1987), pp. vii-xv.
