= Armand Preud'homme =

Belgian componist and organist

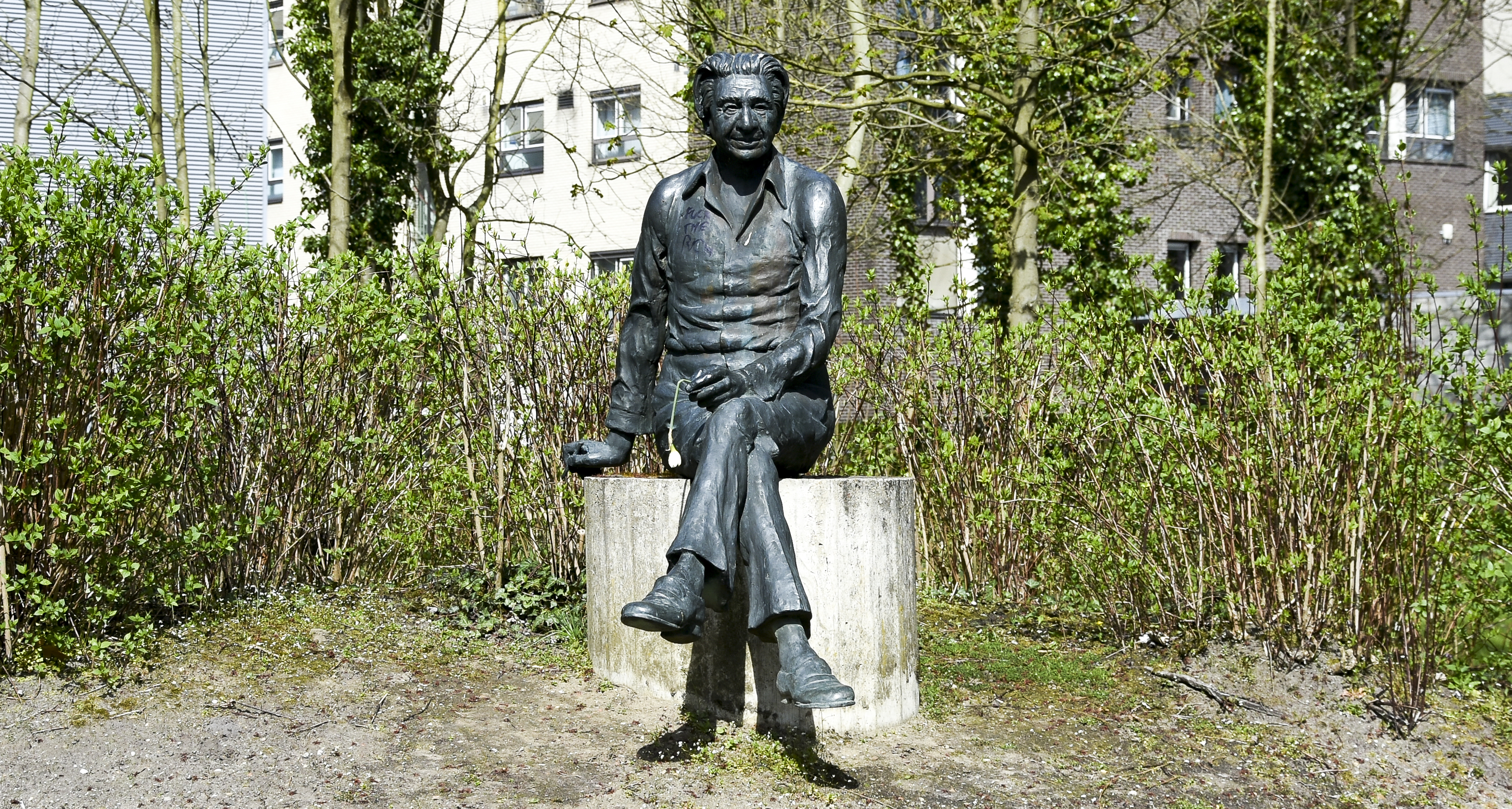
- Sculpture of Preud'homme in Hasselt by Jan Van den Brande
- Born: 21 February 1904
- Died: 7 February 1986 (aged 81)
- Era: 20th century

Armand Preud'homme (21 February 1904, in Peer – 7 February 1986, in Brasschaat) was a Belgian componist and organist.

== Biography ==
Preud'homme studied at the Limburg Organ and Singing School in Hasselt with Arthur Meulemans and at the Lemmens Institute in Mechelen with Jules Van Nuffel, Marinus De Jong and Flor Peeters. From 1930 to 1943 he played the organ in the Saint Amandus Church in Geel.

He composed the music to hundreds of songs and operettas with the texts of particularly Jozef Simons and Eugeen De Ridder. Favorite themes of his were connectivity of people and the nostalgia for his birth region. His most popular operetta Op de purp'ren hei with text of De Ridder was performed by the Royal Flemish Opera (nl, fr). His most popular song was arguably Kempenland; he wrote the music in 1938 and Simons wrote the text during the occupation of the Second World War. Many paramilitary groups used it as their march music.

He became the director of the music school of Mortsel in 1943. In the years of economic repression after the war he accepted work as an organist in restaurants and cinema's for a living. He was a mentor for the choir of Saint Lieven in Antwerp and from 1957 to 1968 he was a music teacher in Hasselt.

In 1959 a television movie on his music was released, called Melodieën van Armand Preud'homme. From 1990 to 2018 the Armand Preud'homme Museum in his birth house remembered to his work and life.
