= Brabant Center for Music Traditions =

Museum and music center in Kempenhout, Belgium

Brabant Center for Music Tradiations
- Brabants Centrum voor Muziektradities
- Location within Belgium
- Established: 9 December 2011
- Location: Kampenhout
- Coordinates: 50°56′27.987″N 4°32′47.526″E
- Website: www.kampenhout.be/bcm/

The Brabant Center for Music Tradiations (Dutch: Brabants Centrum voor Muziektradities) is a museum and folk music center in Kampenhout in Flemish Brabant, Belgium.

The center maintains a study and documentation center with around one thousand publications on traditional folk music in Flanders and the rest of Europe. During the year several changing thematic expositions are shown, next to the permanent musical instrument collection of violin and bagpipes player Hubert Boone, a collection of photographs of musicians and musical instruments and some music recordings.

The collection of Boone plays an important role in the center. As a scientific contributor he was affiliated to the Musical Instrument Museum of Brussels. He produced a variety of works on local music history and folk musical instruments. He was a key member of the folk dance group De Vlier and the ensemble Limbrant.

The center was inaugurated in the Glass Hall (Glazen Zaal) on 4 December 2011, in attendance of prominent Flemish music administrators and the mayor of Kampenhout. On this day an exhibition started on the society of the hummel instrument from the town Sint-Martens-Lennik, and live music was played by the MandolinMan Quartet.

== See also ==
- List of museums in Belgium
- List of music museums
