= Armand Preud'homme Museum =

Armand Preud'homme-museum
- Established: 1990
- Coordinates: 51°7′54.42″N 5°27′6.11″E
- Founder: Jaak Geuns
- Architect: Herman Jaminé
- Owner: municipality of Peer

The Armand Preud'homme Museum was a museum in Peer, Belgium, that was dedicated to the Belgian composer Armand Preud'homme (1904-1986). From 1990 to 2018 the museum formed a combination with the Heemkundig Museum (local museum) upstairs, called the Dulle Griet Museum.

Preud'homme was born in this house, when his father was a teacher and head of the municipal boys school. The land of the house and the school was acquired by the municipality on 3 April 1859. It was developed by the provincial underarchitect Herman Jaminé and built from 1860 to 1861.

Preud'homme was an organist and composed hundreds of songs and operettas on themes like connectivity of people and the nostalgia for his birth region. His most popular operetta was Op de purp'ren hei and his most popular song Kempenland; the latter one was popular during the occupation of the Second World War as march music for paramilitary groups.

The museum was founded by Jaak Geuns and was largely run by volunteers. It showed belongings of the musician, like his grand piano, news paper articles, photographs, and sheet music of his most famous songs and operettas.

The number of groups visiting the museum went down from eight hundred per year at the beginning to just a couple in 2018. In this year the municipality of Peer decided to close both museums. On this site it planned apartments and a service center.

== See also ==
- List of museums in Belgium
- List of music museums
