= Wijchmaal =

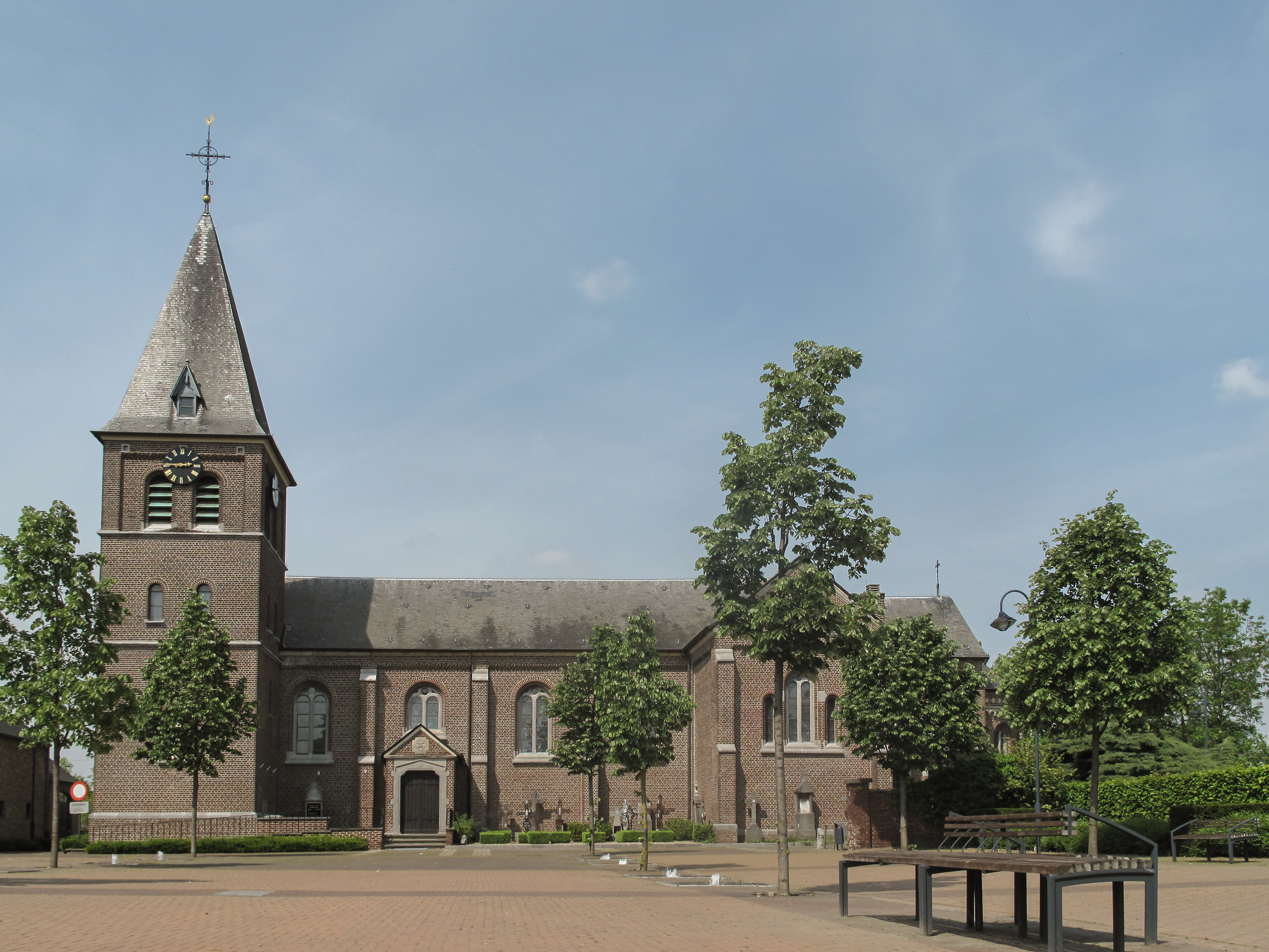
- Church of St Trudo, Wijchmaal

- Location in Belgium
- Coordinates: 51.135602°N 5.414588°E
- Country: Belgium
- Province: Limburg
- Municipality: Peer

Area
  - Total: 12.00 km^{2} (4.63 sq mi)

Population (2021)
  - Total: 3,018
  - Density: 251.5/km^{2} (651.4/sq mi)
- Postal codes: 3990

Wijchmaal is a village in the province of Limburg, Belgium, which since 1977 has been a subdivision of the municipality of Peer. It is located on the low Kempen plateau and has predominantly sandy soil. The village has medieval fishponds that once belonged to the Agnetendal convent in Peer, and an arboretum that originated in 1907 as an experimental plantation to grow wood that would make good pit props. Historically a relatively poor and sparsely populated agricultural settlement, in the later 20th century it became a commuter village for people employed in Eindhoven and Genk.

== Transport and communications ==
Wijchmaal lies about 10 kilometres (6.2 mi) north-east of the junction of the national roads N73 (Kessenich – Tessenderlo) and N74 (Hasselt – Eindhoven), and is served by the bus route between Hamont-Achel and Hasselt operated by De Lijn. Between 1890 and 1948 there was an important interchange on the rural tram system. Trains on the line between Hasselt and Eindhoven that opened in 1866 stopped in the village, but passenger trains stopped running to Wijchmaal in 1958, and goods trains in 1980.

== History ==
Bronze Age and Iron Age burial mounds and Roman inhumations were excavated in the village in the years around 1900.

The name Wijchmaal is first attested in 1007, under the form Vuicmale. Other medieval spellings include Wimale, Wichmale and Wyghmale.

In the 11th century the settlement's overlord was Sint-Truiden Abbey, and the village church, dedicated to St Trudo, was built or renovated by Abbot Adelard II of Sint-Truiden (1055–82) as a chapel of ease. Rights of presentment and tithes continued to belong to the abbey until the end of the 18th century, but during the Middle Ages the lordship passed to the control of the counts of Loon and then the prince-bishopric of Liège. The village had its own bench of aldermen until the French Revolution.

The church became a parish church in 1608, and the first parish priest was appointed in 1611. The parish of Wijchmaal once included a number of hamlets that are no longer distinct from the village itself. After the Concordat of 1801 the church, which had been closed during the years of the revolution, again became a chapel of ease. It was demolished and rebuilt in 1878, and extended in 1939.

A school is attested as early as 1616, but lessons took place in a room that the village rented from a tavern. A dedicated classroom was probably built in 1772. A village school for boys and girls was built in 1861 and demolished in 1976. A separate girls' school opened in 1913, run by Daughters of Charity of Saint Vincent de Paul, who after the interruption of the First World War began work on a convent in 1922. In 1926 they also opened a school for neglected and retarded children that would become the special needs school Medisch Pedagogisch Instituut Sint-Elisabeth. An entirely new village school was built in 1983-84.

== Notable people ==
- Lucien Ceyssens
