= Harmonium Art museuM =

- Location within Belgium
- Location: Klein-Willebroek
- Coordinates: 51°4′48.868″N 4°21′55.508″E
- Type: Musical instrument museum
- Collections: Pump organs
- Founder: Ben Roemendael
- Owner: Ben Roemendael
- Website: harmoniummuseum.be

The Harmonium Art museuM (HAM) is a museum on pump organs in the province of Antwerp, Belgium. It is located at the former Church of the Immaculate Conception in Klein-Willebroek.

The collection has been brought together by Ben Roemendael. In order to be able to show the organs to the public, he founded the museum. One can see free-reed and suction-reed organs. All instruments have been disassembled, cleaned and restored. There are eighty organs all together of which sixty can still be played on.

The pump organs are originating from different countries. One suction-reed organ was built in 1872 in the United States and has two keyboards and a pipe top of Mason & Hamlin. Another, German one was made by Lindholm and has a shared left and right expression and an extension register. The museum has the largest collection of pump organs of Belgian make, like from the families Anneessens, Loret, Kerckhoff and a great many more.

Beside the exposition, organ music is being performed of Belgian composers like Jacques-Nicolas Lemmens and César Franck. Other types of music are performed as well, like from a brass band or in a constellation with other musicians, like a soprano being accompanied by a pump organ and a piano.

== See also ==
- List of museums in Belgium
- List of music museums
