= Peer, Belgium =

Peer
- City and municipality
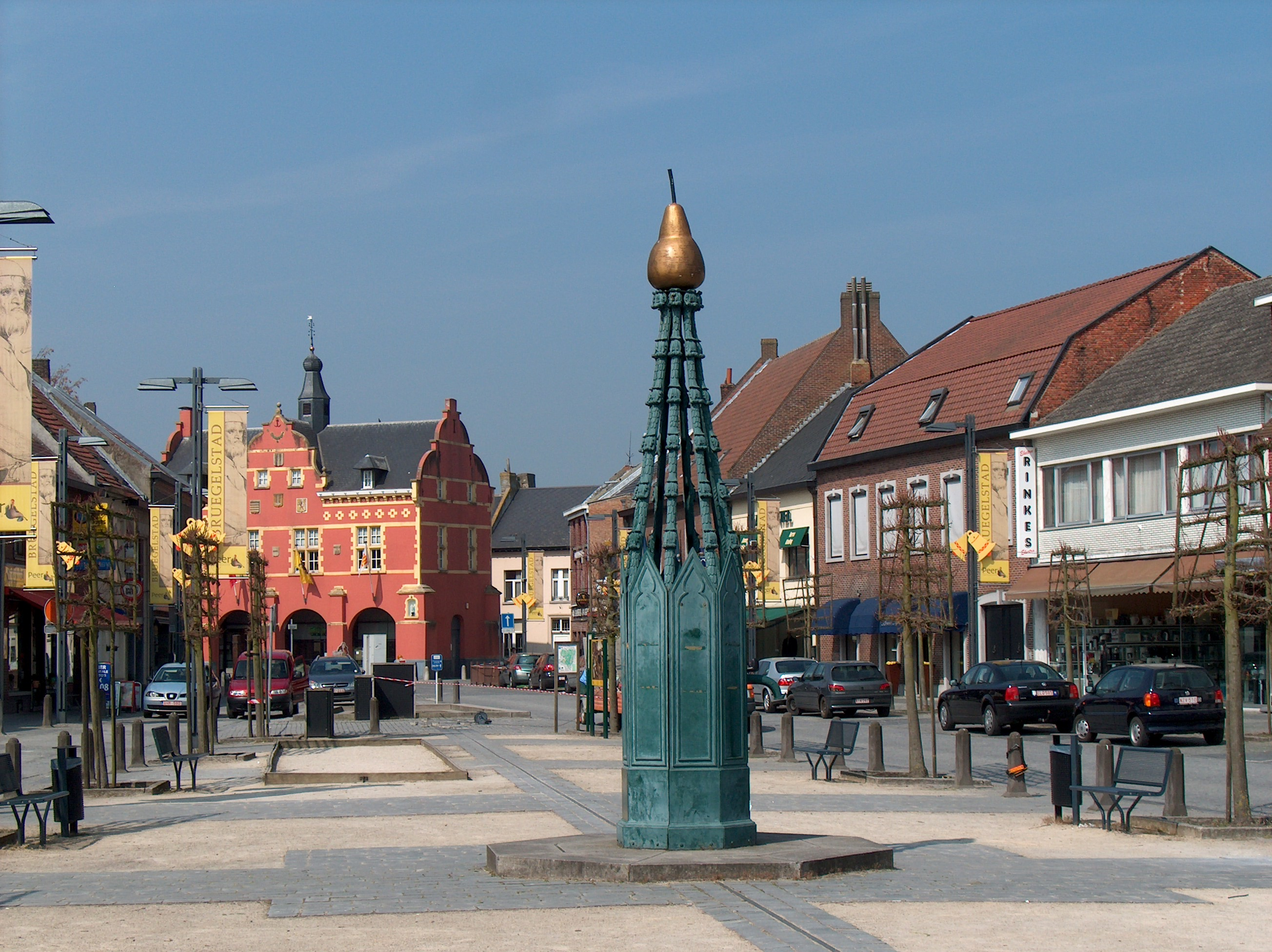

- Flag Coat of arms

- Location of Peer in Limburg
- Interactive map of Peer
- Location in Belgium
- Coordinates: 51°08′N 05°28′E
- Country: Belgium
- Community: Flemish Community
- Region: Flemish Region
- Province: Limburg
- Arrondissement: Maaseik

Government
  - Mayor: Steven Matheï (CD&V)
  - Governing party: CD&V

Area
  - Total: 87.24 km^{2} (33.68 sq mi)

Population (2021-01-01)
  - Total: 16,421
  - Density: 188.2/km^{2} (487.5/sq mi)
- Postal codes: 3990
- NIS code: 72030
- Area codes: 011
- Website: www.peer.be

Peer (Dutch pronunciation: [peːr]) is a municipality and city located in the province of Limburg, Flemish Region, Belgium. On January 1, 2006, Peer had a total population of 15,810. The total area is 86.95 km^{2} which gives a population density of 182 inhabitants per km^{2}.

The municipality consists of the following sub-municipalities: Peer, Grote-Brogel, Kleine-Brogel, Wauberg, Erpekom and Wijchmaal.

Peer is the site of Blues Peer, an annual blues music festival held in July.

== History ==
Peer is the birth place of the composer Armand Preud'homme. From 1990 to 2018 the Armand Preud'homme Museum remembered to his life and work.

The village Grote-Brogel, part of Peer, claims to be the birthplace of Pieter Bruegel. The Bruegel Foundation was also founded in Peer to research the history of Peer and Pieter Bruegel.

Kleine-Brogel, a village that is a part of Peer, includes Kleine Brogel Air Base. Rumours that American nuclear weapons under the NATO nuclear sharing program were stationed at Kleine Brogel were eventually confirmed by Minister of Defence Pieter De Crem in 2008.

== A series of historical maps with notable references to Grote Brogel as Bruegel ==
On a number of old maps, Grote Brogel is prominently depicted as Bruegel, Brugel or Breughel, while other, sometimes more important, places are not mentioned at all.

These maps are based on the work of "Jacob van Deventer".

In 1540 Sebastian Münster published a series of maps, including "BRABANTIA V > RHENIET X < NOVA TABVLA." On this map, Grote Brogel is marked as Brügel. The towns of Peer and Bree are also mentioned.

The map "Belgii inferioris descriptio emendata cum circumiacentium regionum confinijs" was later issued in book format under the supervision of Abraham Ortelius. It was first published in the French-language edition of Ludovico Guicciardini's extensive work on the Low Countries, Description de tout le Pais Bas, printed by Christoffel Plantin in Antwerp in 1582. This map mentions Bruegel while the towns of Peer and Bree are omitted. In 1585, Mercator published a larger edition of this map.

E. van Meteren, a nephew of Ortelius, produced a map of the Low Countries in which Bruegel appears as Brügel.

In 1597, Frans Hogenberg published a new version of DESCRIPTIO GERMANIAE INFERIORIS.

Johannes Mercator shows Breughel and Brey only in present-day Northern Limburg on a map of the County of Moers.

== Climate ==
Climate data for Peer
Month	Jan	Feb	Mar	Apr	May	Jun	Jul	Aug	Sep	Oct	Nov	Dec	Year
Mean daily maximum °C (°F)	5.5 (41.9)	6.6 (43.9)	10.4 (50.7)	14.0 (57.2)	18.8 (65.8)	21.1 (70.0)	23.4 (74.1)	23.5 (74.3)	19.6 (67.3)	14.9 (58.8)	9.2 (48.6)	6.4 (43.5)	14.5 (58.0)
Mean daily minimum °C (°F)	−0.5 (31.1)	−1.0 (30.2)	1.0 (33.8)	2.7 (36.9)	7.2 (45.0)	11.1 (52.0)	10.1 (50.2)	12.1 (53.8)	8.9 (48.0)	5.7 (42.3)	2.6 (36.7)	0.8 (33.4)	5.1 (41.1)
Average precipitation mm (inches)	72.3 (2.85)	57.1 (2.25)	73.3 (2.89)	50.5 (1.99)	63.8 (2.51)	84.9 (3.34)	68.7 (2.70)	62.7 (2.47)	66.8 (2.63)	66.0 (2.60)	76.2 (3.00)	79.7 (3.14)	822 (32.37)
Average precipitation days	13	10	13	10	11	12	10	9	10	11	13	13	135
Source: World Meteorological Organisation (UN)

Peer has in the summer quite a nice temperature, around 20 degrees Celsius. In the winter it normally snows.
