= Museum for Old Techniques =

Museum in Grimbergen, Belgium

Museum of old techniques
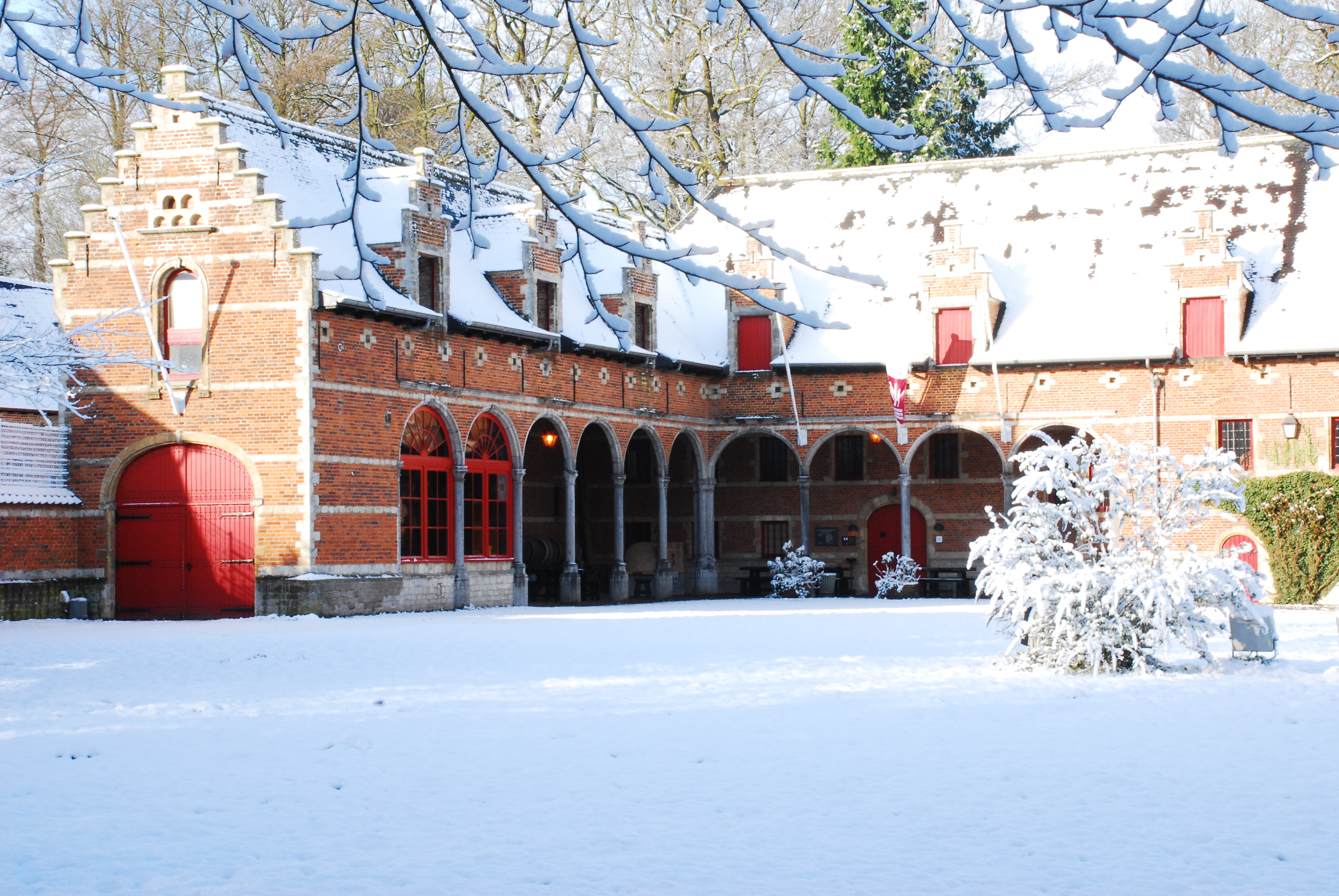
- Location: Grimbergen, Belgium
- Website: Official website

The Museum for Old Techniques (Dutch: Museum voor de Oudere Technieken, MOT) is located in Grimbergen, Belgium. The museum has an extensive collection of hand tools, technical manuals and trade catalogues.

The MOT studies the history of techniques, more specifically natural power. The subject is limited to what is driven by muscle, water or wind power.

== History ==
The MOT was founded in 1982 by Johan David, its curator. The town of Grimbergen made some historic buildings available for it. In 1999 the MOT was recognized as a museum by the Flemish Community.

== Buildings ==
The main building of the MOT is the Guldendal, situated in the shadow of the ruins of the Prinsenkasteel (Prince’s Castle). The administration and staff are accommodated in this building. Here, too, are the library, the educational service and the conference room.

In addition there are the Liermolen and Tommenmolen, two watermills, situated on the Maalbeek. The Liermolen is a working mill, which is used for milling demonstrations.

== Mission ==
The MOT aims to encourage an understanding of the past and present of mankind, here and elsewhere, by giving a realistic picture of the origin and evolution of techniques and their impact of everyday life and the environment.
