= Pieter Brueghel the Younger =

Flemish painter (1564–1638)

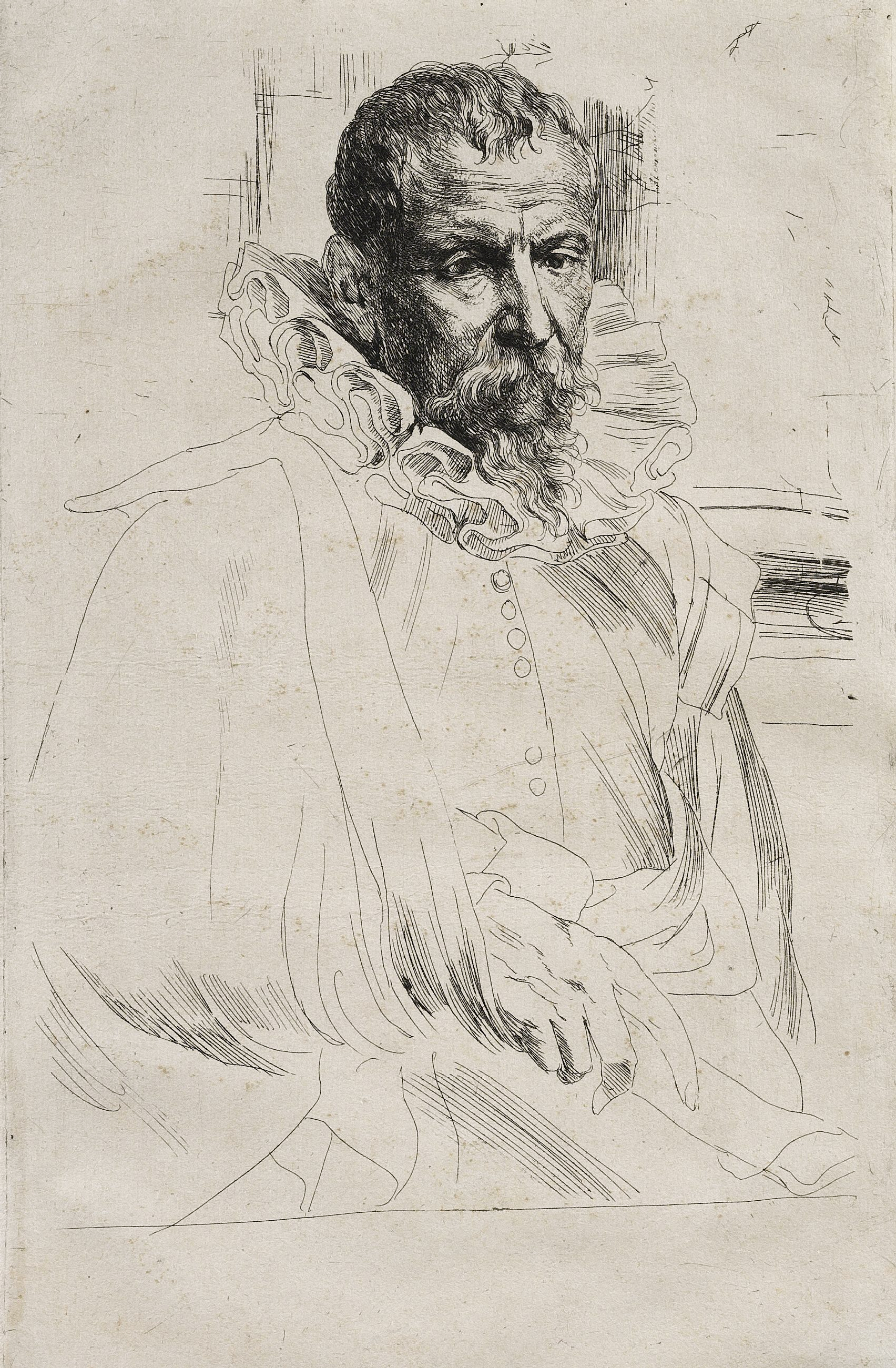
- Pieter Brueghel the Younger by Anthony van Dyck
- Born: 1564; City of Brussels
- Died: 1638; Antwerp
- Occupations: Painter, architectural drafter
- Children: Pieter III. Brueghel
- Relatives: Jan Brueghel the Elder

Pieter Brueghel (Note: Also spelt as Bruegel or Breughel. Before 1616 he signed his name as Brueghel and after 1616 as Breughel.) the Younger (/ˈbrɔɪɡəl/ BROY-gəl, also US: /ˈbruːɡəl/ BROO-gəl; Dutch: [ˈpitər ˈbrøːɣəl]; between 23 May and 10 October 1564 – between March and May 1638) was a Flemish painter known for numerous copies after his father Pieter Bruegel the Elder's work, as well as original compositions and Bruegelian pastiches. The large output of his studio (some 1,400 pictures exist with plausible links to Brueghel and his shop), which produced for the local and export market, contributed to the international spread of his father's imagery.

Traditionally Pieter Brueghel the Younger was nicknamed 'de helse Brueghel', 'Hellish Brueghel', on the belief that he was the author of several paintings with fantastic depictions of fire and grotesque imagery. These paintings have now been attributed to his brother Jan Brueghel the Elder.

== Life ==
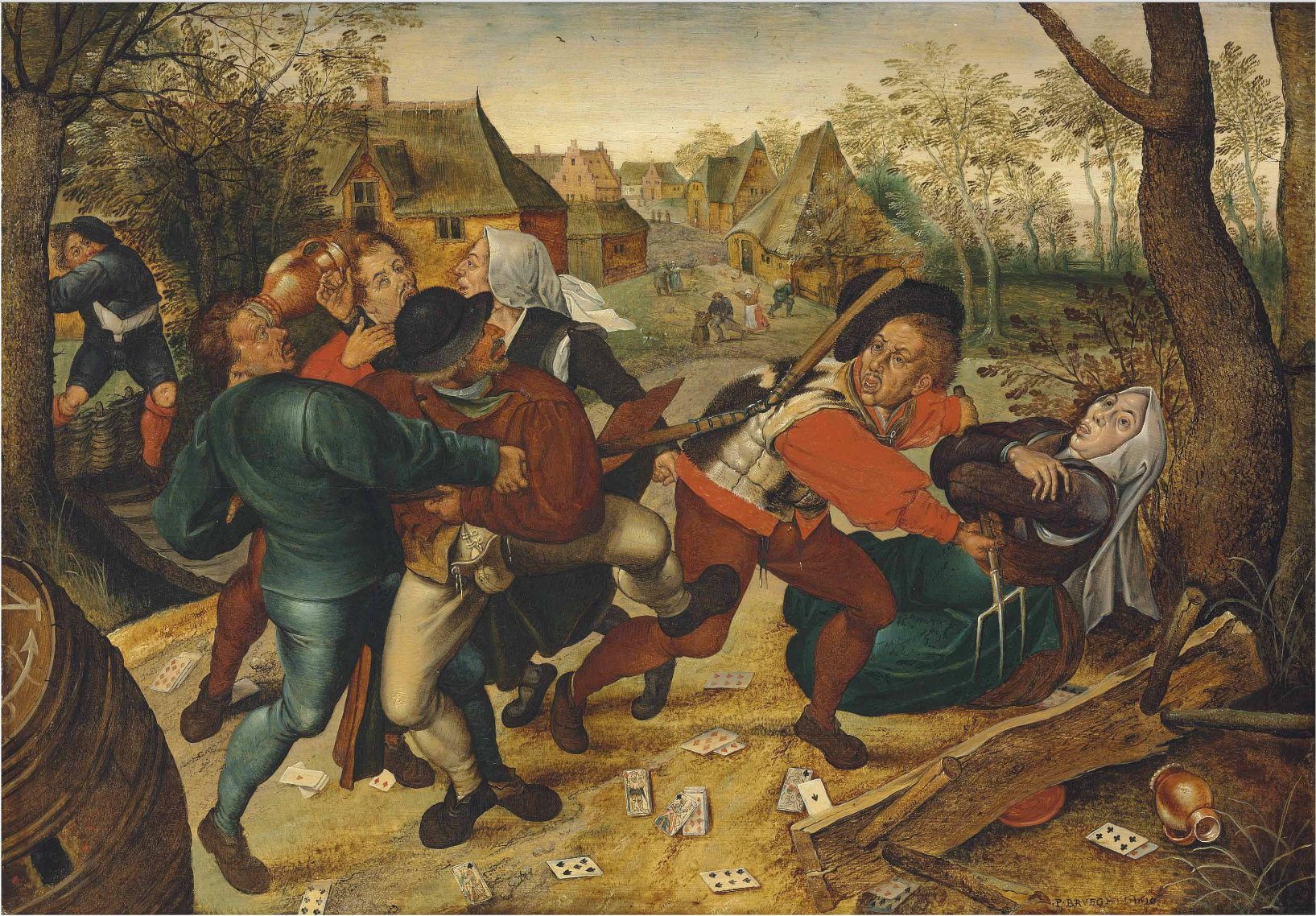
A country brawl

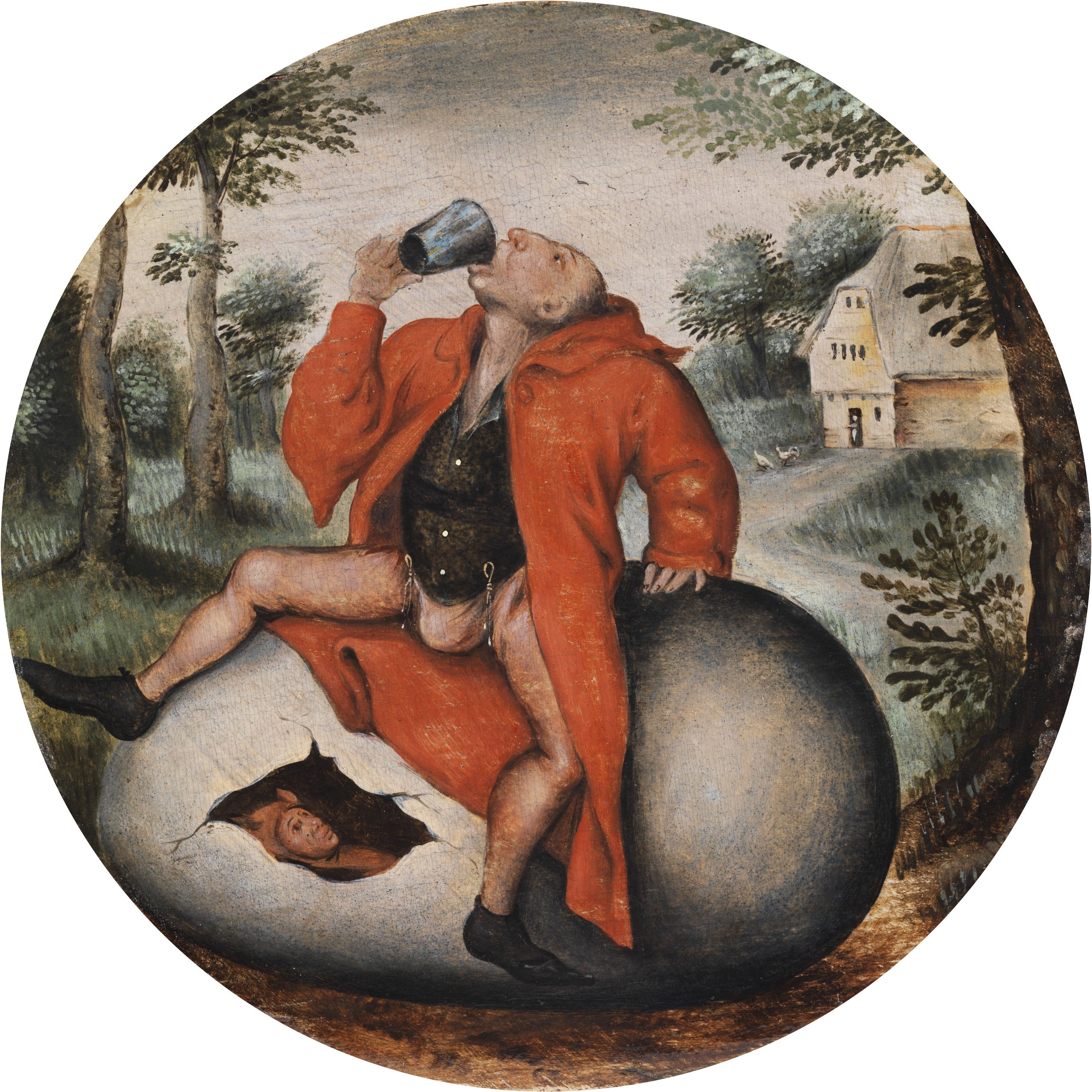
Drunkard on an egg

Pieter Brueghel the Younger was born in Brussels, the oldest son of the famous sixteenth-century Netherlandish painter Pieter Brueghel the Elder (known as "Peasant Brueghel") and Mayken Coecke van Aelst. His mother was the daughter of the prominent artist Pieter Coecke van Aelst (already deceased at the time of Pieter's birth) and artist and print publisher Mayken Verhulst. Mayken Verhulst was an accomplished artist in her own right, known for her miniature paintings. The Brueghel family lived in the centre of Brussels in the home of Mayken Verhulst. In 1569, when Pieter the younger was only five years old, his father died. Following the death of his mother in 1578, Pieter, together with his brother Jan Brueghel the Elder (also referred to as "Velvet Brueghel", "Paradise Breughel" and "Flower Breughel") and sister Maria, were raised by their maternal grandmother Mayken Verhulst. According to the biographer and art theorist Karel van Mander, who published a 'Life' of Pieter Bruegel the Elder in his 1604 Schilder-boeck (Painter Book), Mayken Verhulst provided her grandson Jan with artistic training. On that basis it has been assumed traditionally that, like his brother Jan, Pieter also received his initial artistic instruction from his maternal grandmother. Doubts have been raised, however, over Mayken Verhulst's role in the training of Jan Brueghel the Elder as Jan reportedly lived in Brussels from his birth in 1568 until 1583, while Mayken moved to Mechelen long before he had reached the age to start his artistic training. It is more likely he learned painting from relatives working as tapestry designers in Brussels and received from his maternal grandmother Mayken Verhulst only training in watercolour techniques, such as miniature painting. A similar training pattern may have been followed by Pieter Brueghel the Younger.

Early in 1583, Pieter and Jan moved to Antwerp. Pieter entered the workshop of the landscape painter Gillis van Coninxloo (1544–1607), who was related to the Brueghel family through marriage. Van Coninxloo's mother Adriana van Doornicke was the sister of the first wife of Pieter Coecke van Aelst who was Pieter's grandfather. His teacher was a Protestant and was forced to flee Antwerp in 1585 after the Fall of Antwerp. Pieter Brueghel the Younger is admitted as an independent master of the Guild of Saint Luke of Antwerp in 1585, enrolling as one of the 'free master's sons' (vrymeesterssonen).

It is not known exactly when Brueghel established his own independent studio after becoming an independent master. His first surviving dated painting dates to 1593, several years later. It is however known that from 1589 he was established in a house in Antwerp located on the Bogaardestraat, near to the junction with Sint-Antoniusstraat. The house, which he rented, was located in a poorer part of town, nestled amongst small shopkeepers' houses and at least one brothel, and comprised a front and rear building containing a large studio where Brueghel could work, store materials and, presumably, finished works. He lived at the property with his wife Elisabeth Goddelet (or Godelet), whom he married in 1588 and with whom he had seven children between 1589 and 1597, many of whom died young. One son called Pieter Brueghel III was also a painter. The family lived at this property until at least May 1609, before relocating, at some point before 1616, to the more affluent area on the Brabantse Korenmarkt behind the Tapestry Hall.

Nine formal apprentices, including Frans Snyders and Andries Daniels, passed through Brueghel's workshop between 1588 and 1626/27. Many other artists found work in his studio as 'journeymen' – peripatetic jobbing artists hired by day or by contract without need of Guild registration. With an average of one or two formal apprentices every few years, and perhaps several journeymen at any one time, Brueghel thus had a relatively large workforce at his disposal to assist with his prodigious output.

The precise date of Brueghel's death is not known. His name appears in the register of Antwerp's Guild of St. Luke in a section recording funerary debts for the year 1638, indicating that he died during the Guild year 1637–38.

== Work ==
=== General ===
Pieter Brueghel the Younger painted landscapes, religious subjects, proverbs, and village scenes. A few flower still-life paintings by Pieter have been recorded. His genre paintings of peasants emphasise the picturesque and are regarded by some as lacking Pieter the Elder's subtlety and humanism.

He and his workshop were prolific copyists of Pieter Bruegel the Elder's most famous compositions. His name and work were largely forgotten in the 18th and 19th centuries until he was rediscovered in the first half of the 20th century.

=== Original works ===
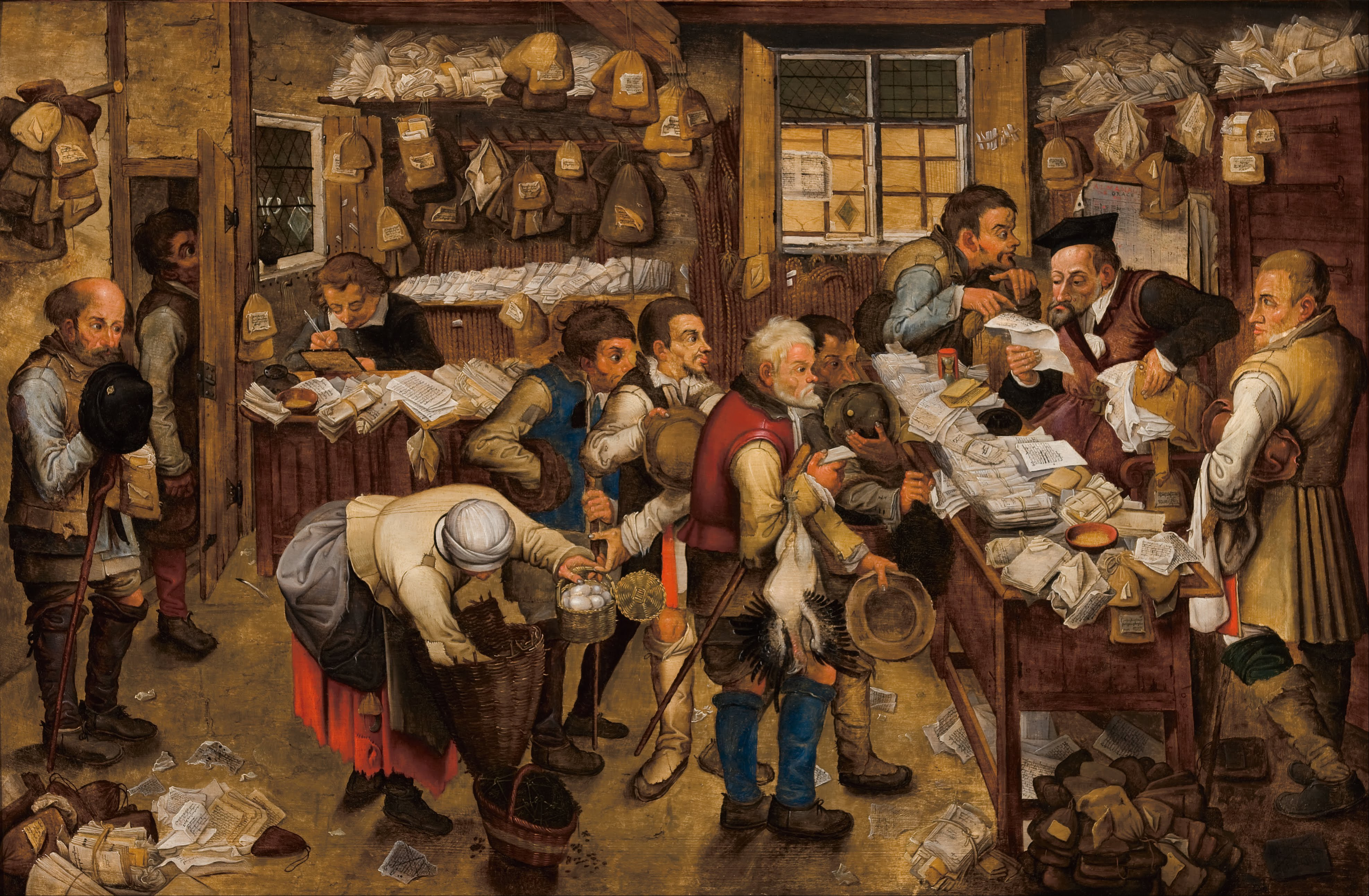
The Village Lawyer or The Tax Collector's Office

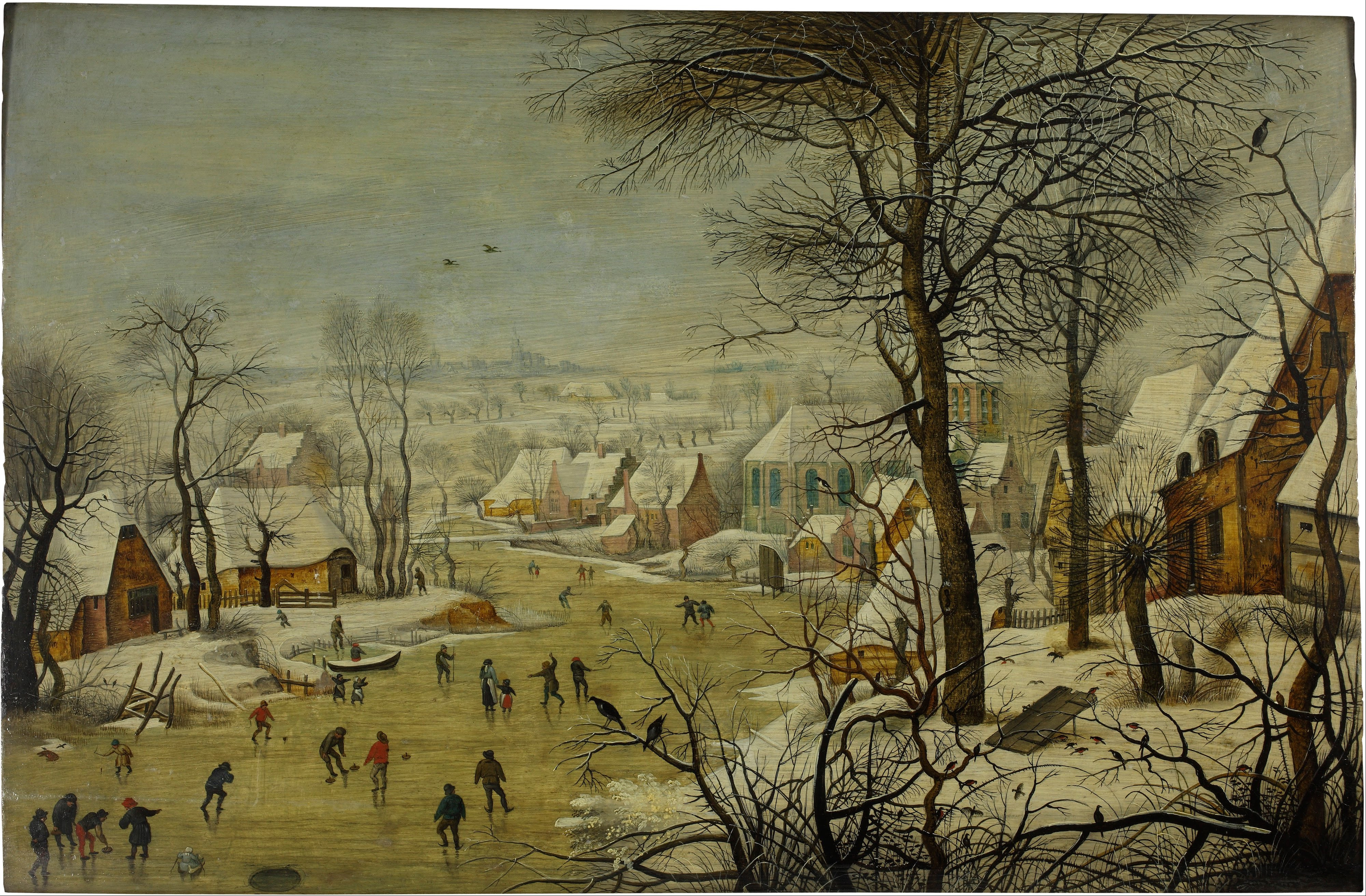
Copy of his father's Winter Landscape with a Bird Trap, which he copied in about 25 versions

Pieter Brueghel the Younger created original works largely in the idiom of his father which are energetic, bold and bright and adapted to the 17th-century style. One of the artist's most successful original designs was the painting of The Village Lawyer (sometimes also called the Tax Collector's Office, the Payment of the Tithe, the Lawyer of Bad Cases and the Notary's Office). The different titles of the work indicate that it may have been interpreted in these different ways in the 17th century. The title The Village Lawyer is probably the best suited since the person behind the desk is wearing a lawyer's bonnet, the collection of taxes usually did not occur in such setting and the paperwork and bags on the desk look like those for requests and decrees. The picture also shows peasants lining up with presents such as chickens and eggs to please the lawyer, which was a common occurrence, whereas tithe payments were made in grain. The painting shows his interest in and close observation of village life. Pieter Brueghel the Younger's workshop made many copies of the composition in different formats. There exist 19 signed and dated versions of this work (from between 1615 and 1622) out of some 25 originals and 35 questionable versions.

Another original composition of Pieter Brueghel the Younger is the Whitsun Bride, which is known in at least five autograph versions. One of the copies was formerly held by the Metropolitan Museum of Art. The picture depicts a Flemish springtime custom of choosing and crowning a queen at Whitsuntide. The festival is focused around a flower gathered in the fields by children. This painting distinguishes itself in style and colour clearly from his father's work. The painting uses bright colours, with much vermilion and a rich blue-green in the figures and blue for the sky. The colours display a unity of tone distinctive of the 17th century. The picture also displays a unity in drawing and composition. Another original composition by Pieter Brueghel the Younger are four small tondos representing the Four Stages of the River (all at the National Gallery Prague). As his style never evolved from the manner of his early career it is difficult to date his work.

In several cases, it is not clear whether a composition is an original composition by Pieter Brueghel the Younger or a copy after a lost work by his father.

=== Copyist ===
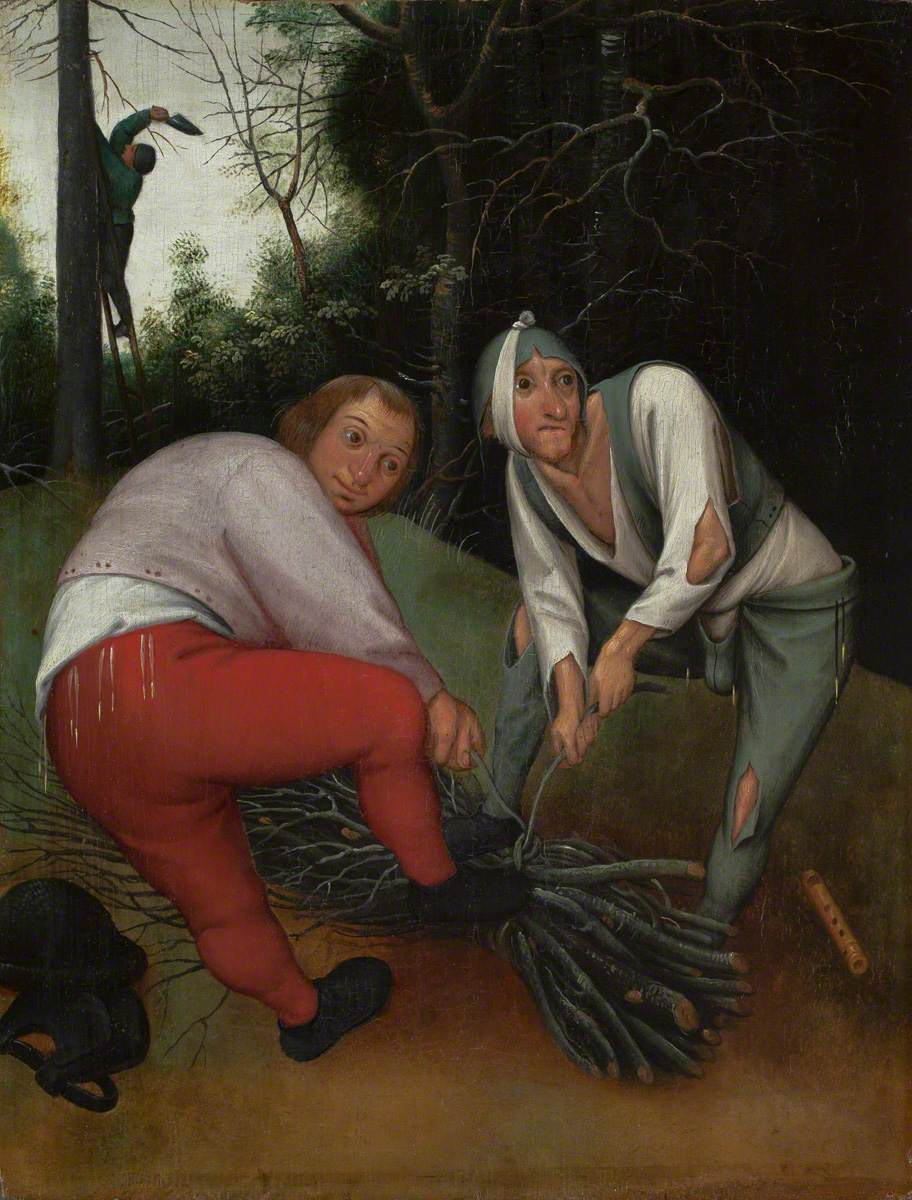
Two Peasants Binding Firewood (c.1604/16), Barber Institute of Fine Arts

Apart from these paintings of his own invention, Pieter Brueghel the Younger also copied the famous compositions of his father through a technique called pouncing. This large scale activity was only possible thanks to his large, well-organised workshop. Comparison of some copies with the originals reveals differences, both in terms of colour as well as the omission or addition of certain details. This may indicate that the copyist re-drafted some sections, or possibly based the copies on prints after original works, rather than on the originals themselves. Pieter the Younger frequently made paintings out of his father's figural designs, including drawings for prints.

As Pieter Brueghel the Younger did not always have access to the original paintings of his father he would in fact often rely on prints of his father's work to create his derived compositions. He also had access to (now lost) compositional drawings and intermediary cartoons which his father had made and then transferred to panels using pouncing. His work is often the only source of knowledge about works of his father that are lost. One example of just such a work is the Two Peasants Binding Firewood, of which several autograph versions exist (Barber Institute of Fine Arts; Private Collection), alongside various studio productions and even copies made outside the Brueghel workshop, which seems to preserve a now-lost original composition by the Elder Bruegel.

The subjects of the copied works cover the entire range of themes and works by Pieter the Elder, including specific religious compositions on both the grand and the small scale. The principal subjects are proverb and peasant scenes of his father.

Spring

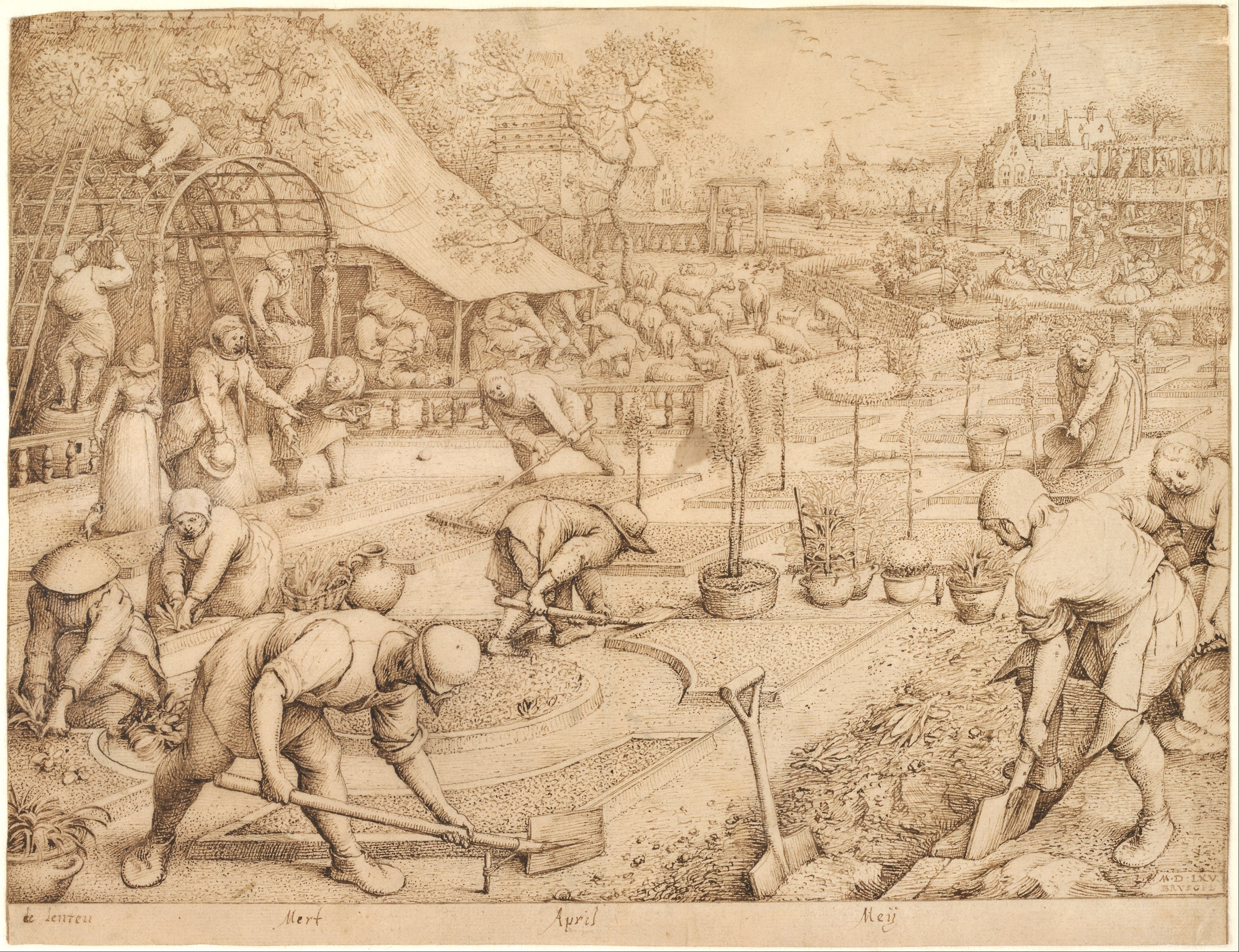
By Pieter Bruegel the Elder (1565), Albertina, depicting peasants tending to a garden

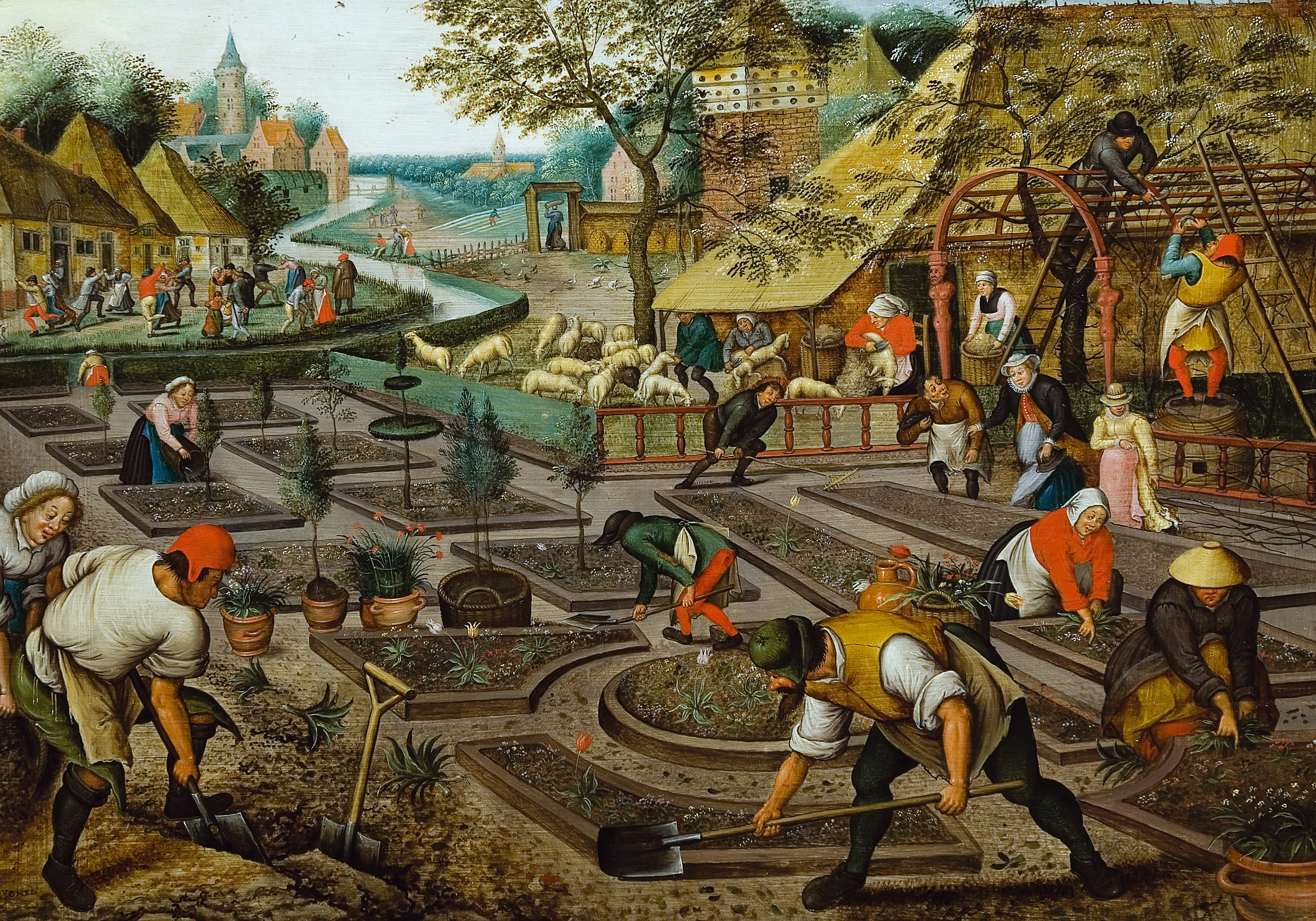
By Pieter Bruegel the Younger, National Museum of Art of Romania. This is a nearly identical mirror image of his father's drawing.

The most frequently copied work of his father was the Winter Landscape with Skaters and a Bird-trap. This work was reproduced by Pieter Brueghel the Younger and his workshop at least 60 times. Of these copies 10 are signed and 4 are dated (1601, 1603, 1616 and 1626). The next most popular work of Pieter the Elder was the Adoration of the Magi in the Snow of which Pieter Brueghel the Younger and his workshop produced about 30 copies.

The workshop also produced no less than 25 copies of Pieter Brueghel the Elder's St John the Baptist Preaching, the original of which is widely believed to be the picture dated 1566, in the Museum of Fine Arts Budapest. Some of the copies are held in the collections of museums such as the Hermitage Museum, the Royal Museum of Fine Arts Antwerp, the National Museum Kraków, the Rheinisches Landesmuseum Bonn, the Stedelijk Museum Wuyts-Van Campen en Baron Caroly and the Musée des Beaux-Arts de Valenciennes. Some of the copies are signed and dated. The quality and the large number of versions produced by Brueghel the Younger suggest that he had first-hand knowledge of his father's original. Scholars have contended that Brueghel the Elder's original picture offered a coded comment on the religious debates that raged in the Low Countries during the 1560s and that it represented a clandestine sermon as held by the Protestant reformers of that time.

Pieter the Younger changed some details of his father's original composition. For instance, some versions omit an unidentified figure of a bearded man in black, who is turned towards the spectator. The omission appears to confirm speculation that his prominent presence in the original composition was not accidental. The distinctive face of this figure suggests that it may be a portrait, possibly of the artist himself or the patron who commissioned the painting. The figure of Christ has often been identified either as the man in grey behind the left arm of the Baptist or the bearded man further to the left with his arms crossed. The continued popularity of the picture a generation after Pieter Brueghel the Elder's death when the subject had not only lost its political implications but ran contrary to the religious current of the time, shows there was a more aesthetic appreciation of the subject. The composition was then likely enjoyed more for its representation of humanity in all its diversity of race, class, temperament and attitude.

The large-scale production of copies of his father's oeuvre demonstrates that there was a significant demand for Pieter the Elder's work. At the same time the copies contributed to the popularisation of Pieter the Elder's idiom. Without the son's copying work the public would not have had access to his father's work, which was mainly held in elite private collections, such as the imperial collection of Rudolf II in Prague or the Farnese collection in Parma. At the same time Pieter the Younger extended his father's repertoire through his own inventions and variations on themes by his father.

The Preaching of St. John the Baptist

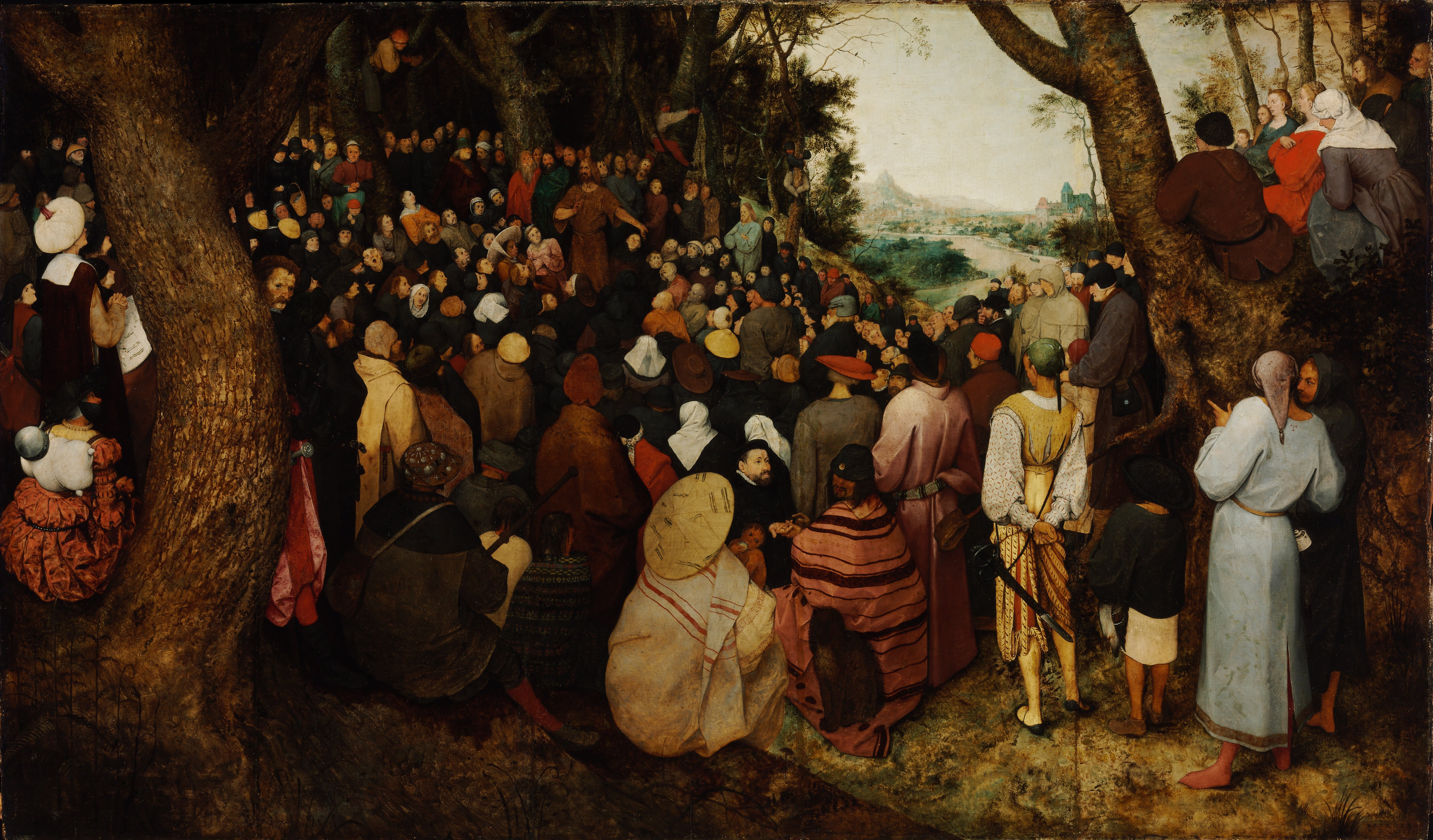
Original by Pieter Bruegel the Elder (1566), Museum of Fine Arts Budapest

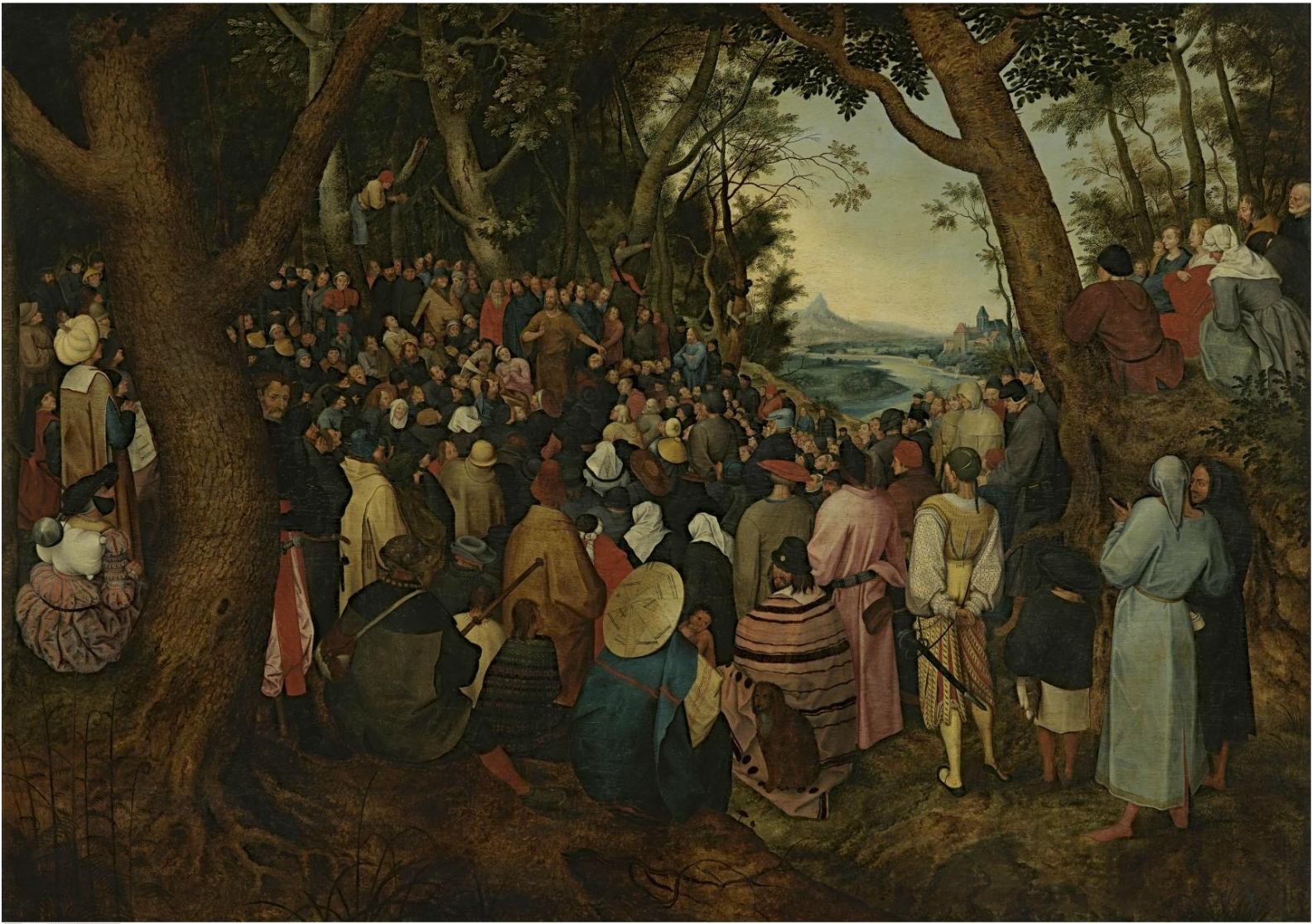
Copy (after 1616) by Pieter Brueghel the Younger of his father's work omitting the bearded man in black, facing the spectator in the original, Groeningemuseum
The Alchemist

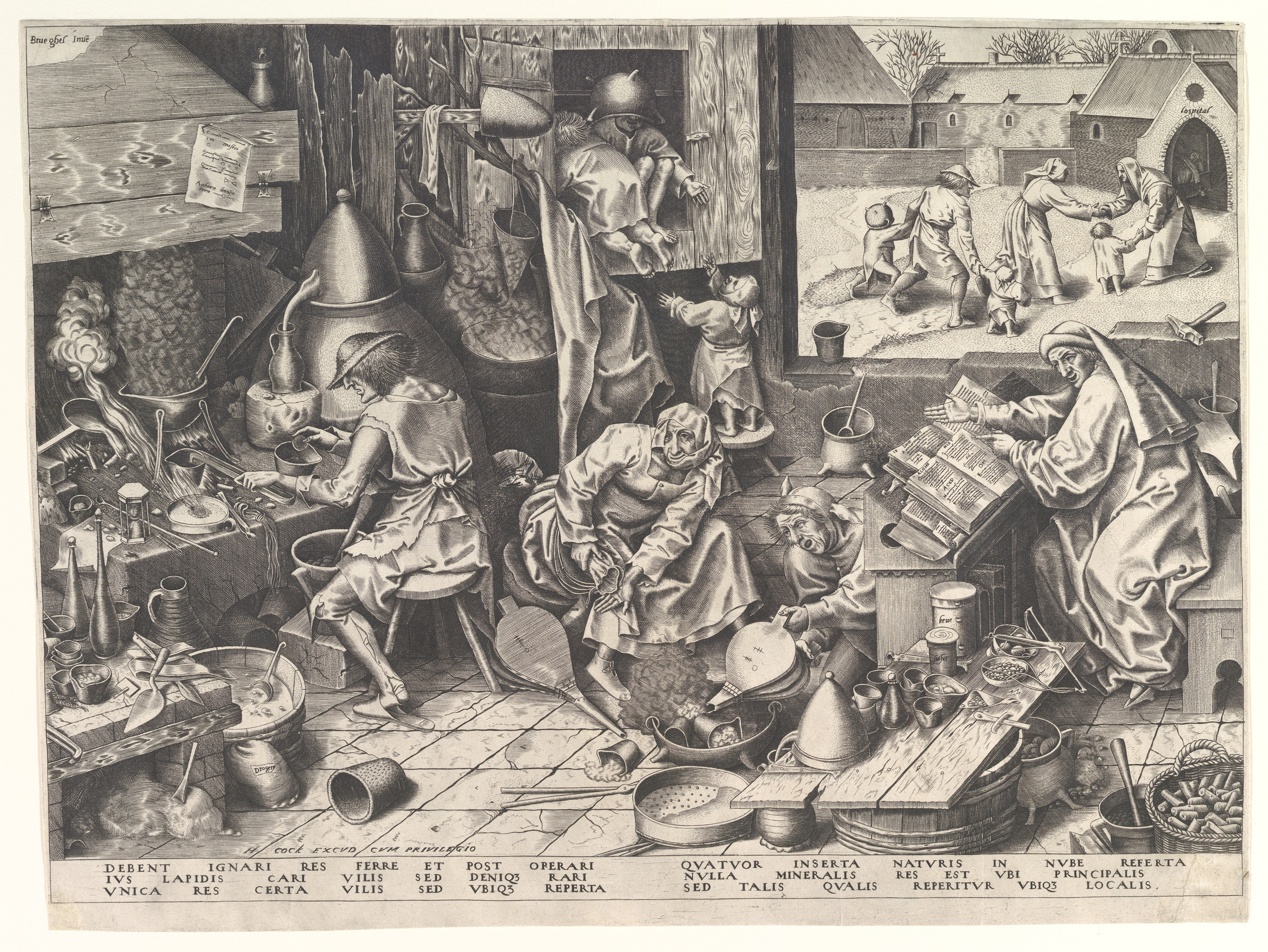
The Alchemist by Pieter Bruegel the Elder, Metropolitan Museum of Art, original etching

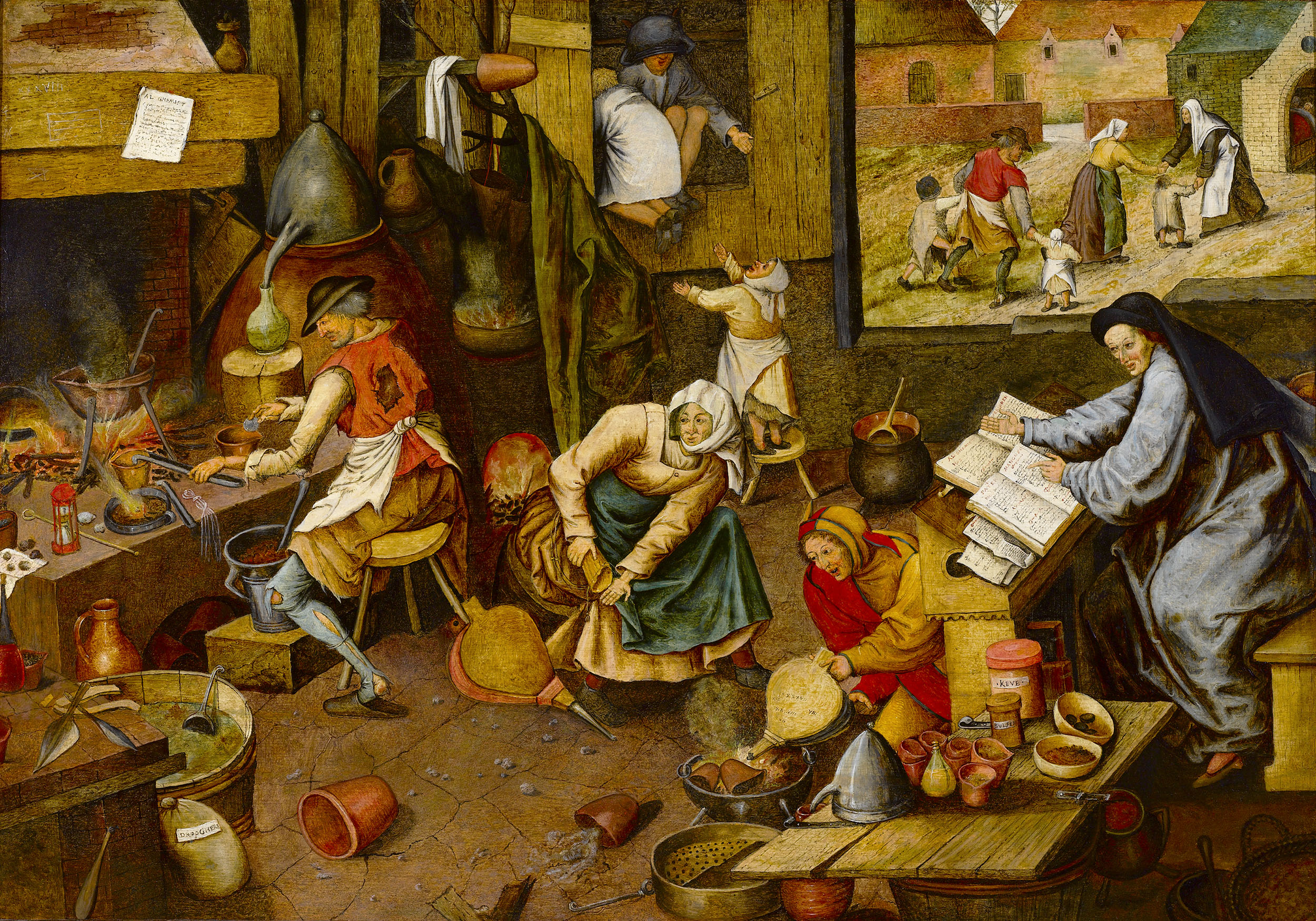
Copy of The Alchemist by Pieter Brueghel the Younger, recreated in colour on panel
The Parable of the Blind Leading the Blind

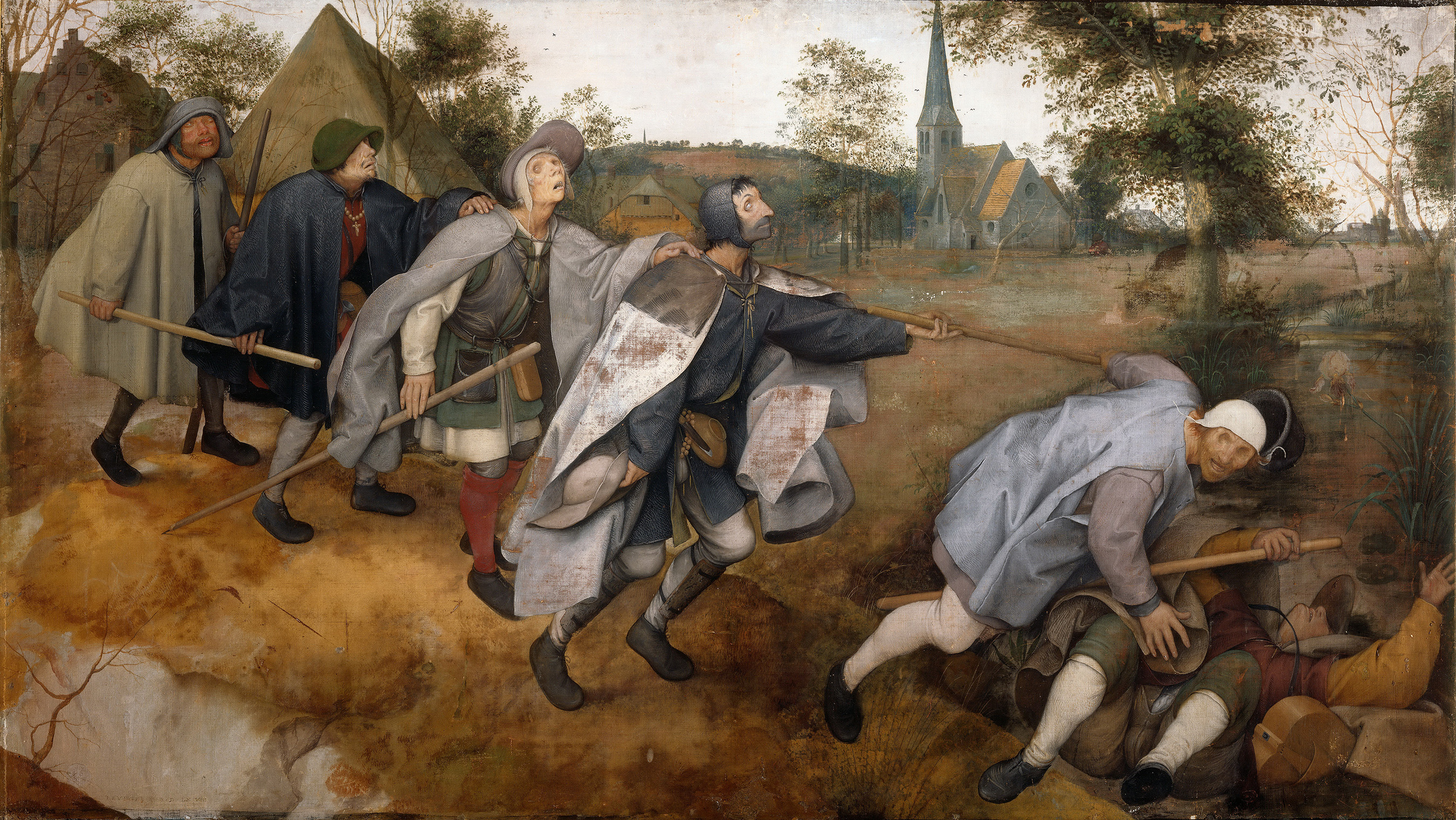
Original The Parable of the Blind Leading the Blind by Brueghel the Elder (1568)

Copy of The Parable of the Blind Leading the Blind by Brueghel the Younger (c. 1616)

== Selected works ==
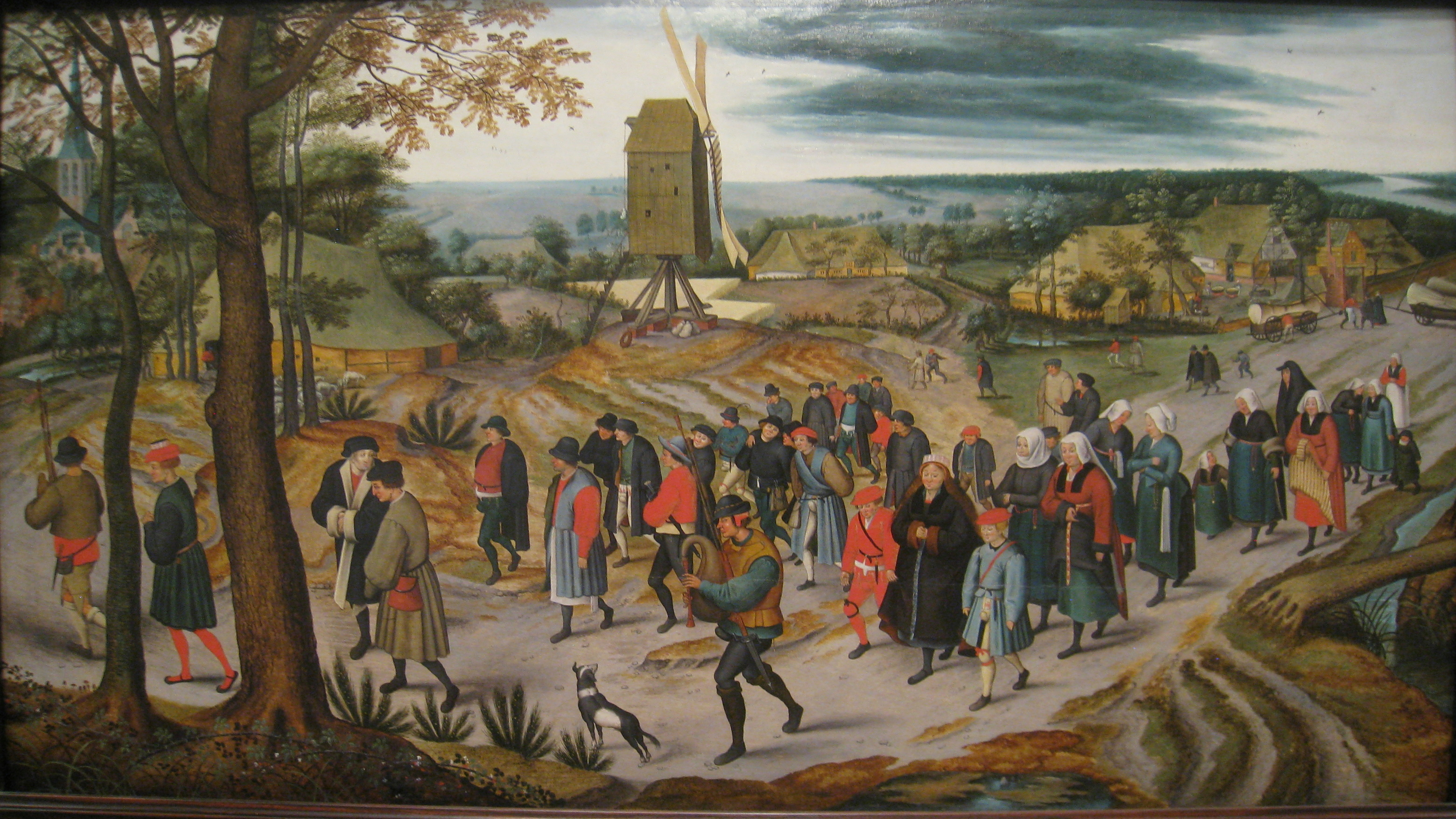
The marriage procession (1623)

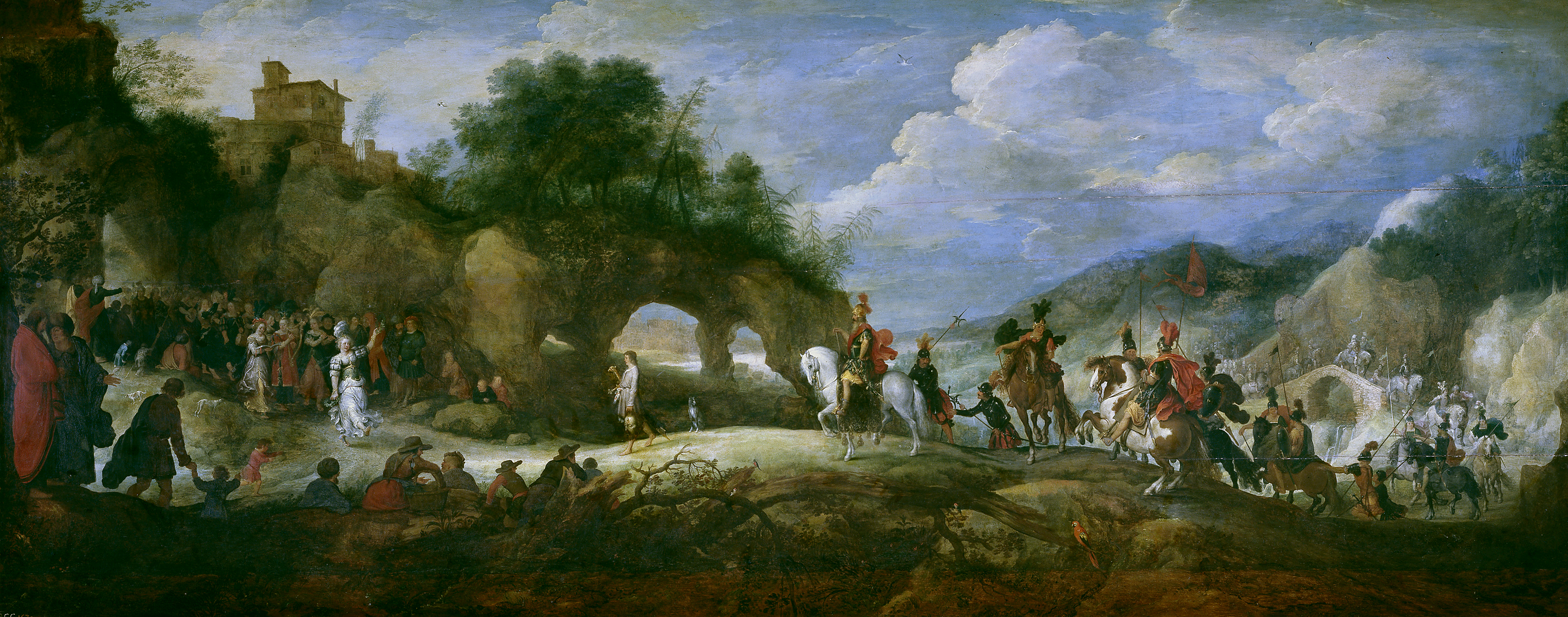
The Triumph of David over Goliath, collaboration with Adriaen van Stalbemt for the figures, Museo del Prado

- A Country Brawl
- A Village Festival
- Adoration of the Magi
- Census in Bethlehem (Copied by the son several times from the father's original (1567) in Brussels; one of the son's copies of 1610 in also at Brussels)
- Flemish Proverbs
- Massacre of the Innocents
- Peasant Wedding Dance
- Saint John's Dancers in Molenbeeck'
- The Alchemist
- The Crucifixion
- The Faithless Shepherd
- The Holy Family with St John
- The Procession to Calvary
- The Sermon of Saint John the Baptist
- The Seven Acts of Mercy
- The Village Lawyer
- The Visit to the Farm
- Village Fair
- Winter Landscape with a Bird Trap

== Family tree ==
Brueghel family tree

Pieter Bruegel the Elder
Pieter Brueghel the Younger	Jan Brueghel the Elder
Ambrosius Brueghel	Jan Brueghel the Younger	Anna Brueghel x David Teniers the Younger	Paschasia Brueghel	Hieronymous van Kessel the Younger
Jan Pieter Brueghel	Abraham Brueghel	Jan Baptist Brueghel	Jan van Kessel the Elder
