= Peter Benoit Huis =

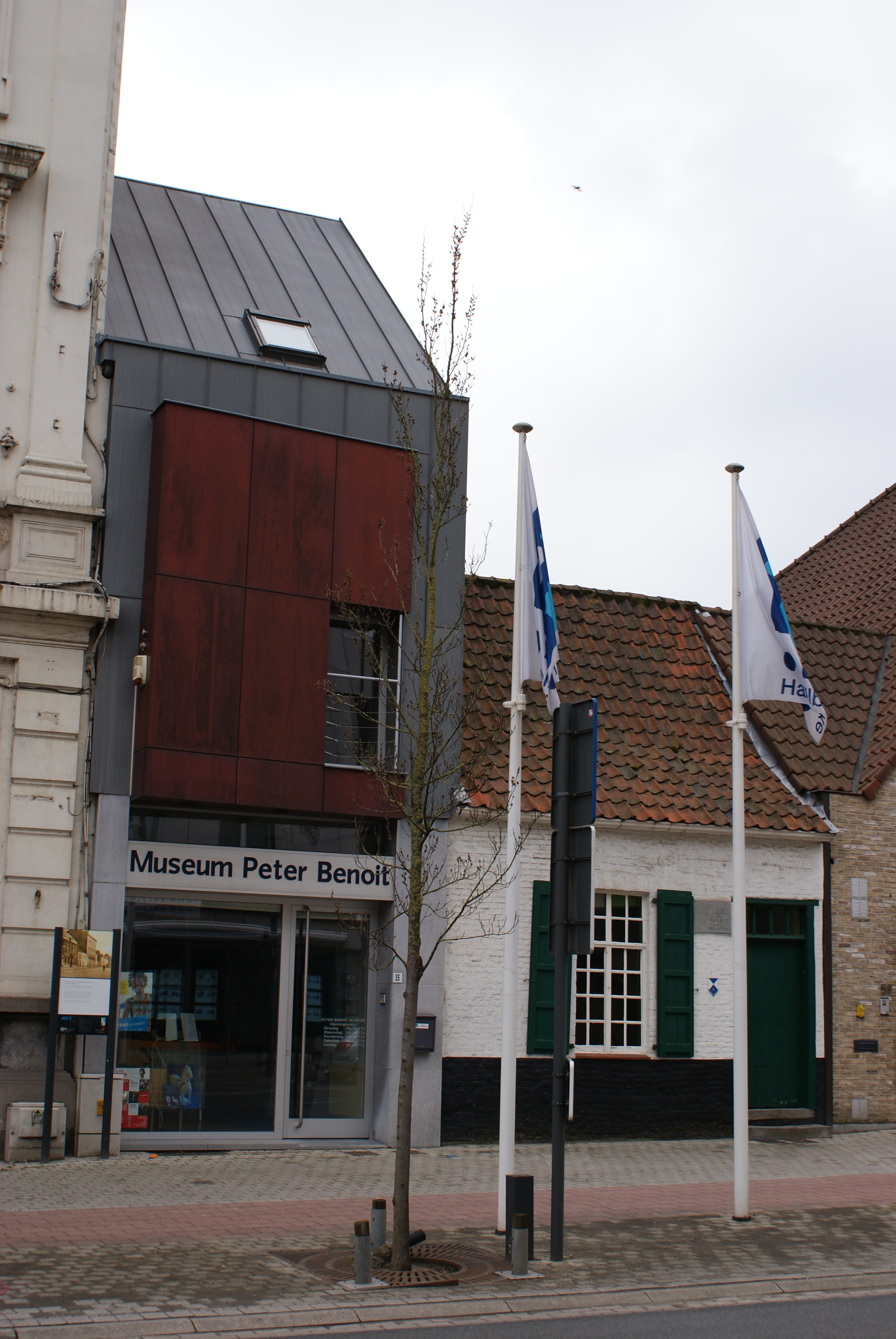
- Museum of Benoit

- Location within Belgium
- Location: Harelbeke
- Coordinates: 50°51′21.378″N 3°18′35.506″E
- Type: biographical museum
- Collections: on Peter Benoit
- Founder: Paul Vandebuerie
- Curator: Paul Vandebuerie
- Website: www.harelbeke.be/museum

Peter Benoit Huis (literally Peter Benoit House) is a museum in Harelbeke in West Flanders, Belgium.

The museum is dedicated to the work of the Flemish composer and musical educational theorist Peter Benoit (1834-1901). It was founded by Paul Vandebuerie, a composer from Harelbeke and collector in large part of the collection of the museum.

In 2001 the concept of the museum was newly designed to an experience museum. Benoits history is staged by five female personalities that have played a crucial role in his life. As a result, his life is being told from different angles. The characters are:

- Rosalie Monie, his mother from whom he learned to love music;
- Julie Zoë Pfotzer, whom he met during his stay in Paris;
- Flore Wantzel, the woman he married when he returned to Brussels;
- Constance Teichmann, who inspired him in Antwerp for his religious work;
- Agnes Mertens, his love until he died.

In the museum a film can be seen and music can be heard, both from him and from his colleague composers. One of his most renown music pieces is Phantasy 3. It was played for years as the closing melody of the broadcaster BRT. Near the museum, the little birth house of Benoit can be visited. It gives an impression of the poor circumstances in which he was born. The museum also hosts a library with a variety of works on Benoit and a collection of 4,000 folk songs.

== See also ==
- List of museums in Belgium
- List of music museums
