= Tellin =

Municipality in Wallonia, Belgium

Tellin Telin (Walloon)
- Municipality
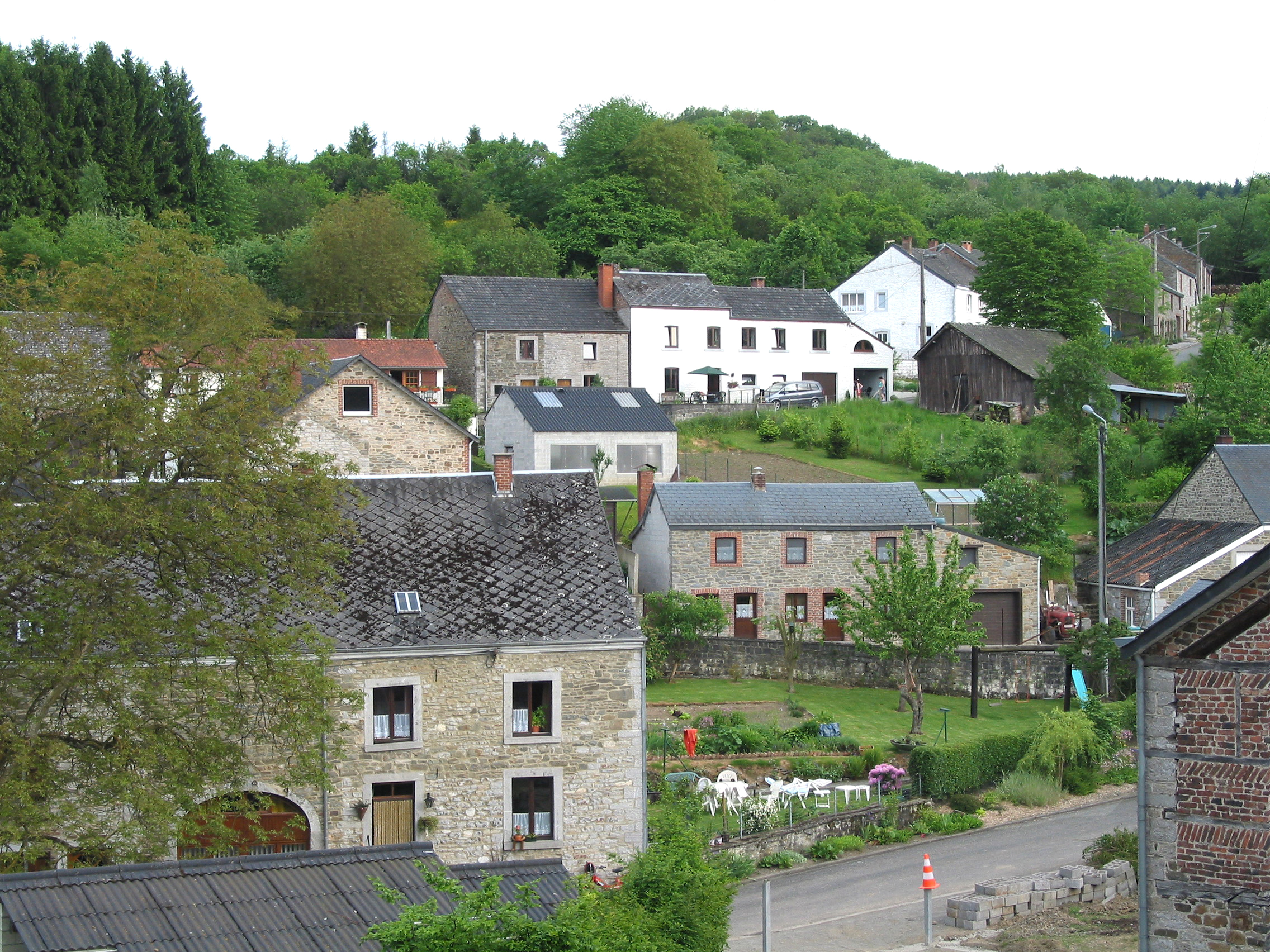

- Flag Coat of arms

- Location of Tellin in Luxembourg province
- Interactive map of Tellin
- Location in Belgium
- Coordinates: 50°4.9′N 05°13.1′E
- Country: Belgium
- Community: French Community
- Region: Wallonia
- Province: Luxembourg
- Arrondissement: Neufchâteau

Government
  - Mayor: Yves Degeye
  - Governing party: ERC

Area
  - Total: 56.95 km^{2} (21.99 sq mi)

Population (2018-01-01)
  - Total: 2,468
  - Density: 43.34/km^{2} (112.2/sq mi)
- Postal codes: 6927
- NIS code: 84068
- Area codes: 084
- Website: (in French) www.tellin.be

Tellin (French pronunciation: [tɛlɛ̃]; Walloon: Telin) is a municipality of Wallonia located in the province of Luxembourg, Belgium, in the Ardennes.

On 1 January 2007 the municipality, which covers 56.64 km^{2}, had 2,386 inhabitants, giving a population density of 42.1 inhabitants per km^{2}.

The municipality consists of the following districts: Bure, Grupont, Resteigne, and Tellin.

== Sights ==
The Bell and Carillon Museum was housed in a former stagecoach inn, from 1992 to 2013. The museum showed the history of the foundry, manufacturing, professional secrets and the work of the bell-founders. In addition, there was a unique set of weather-vanes and clocks.

== See also ==
- List of protected heritage sites in Tellin
