= Stedelijk Museum Wuyts-Van Campen en Baron Caroly =

Coordinates: 51.1315°N 4.5679°E

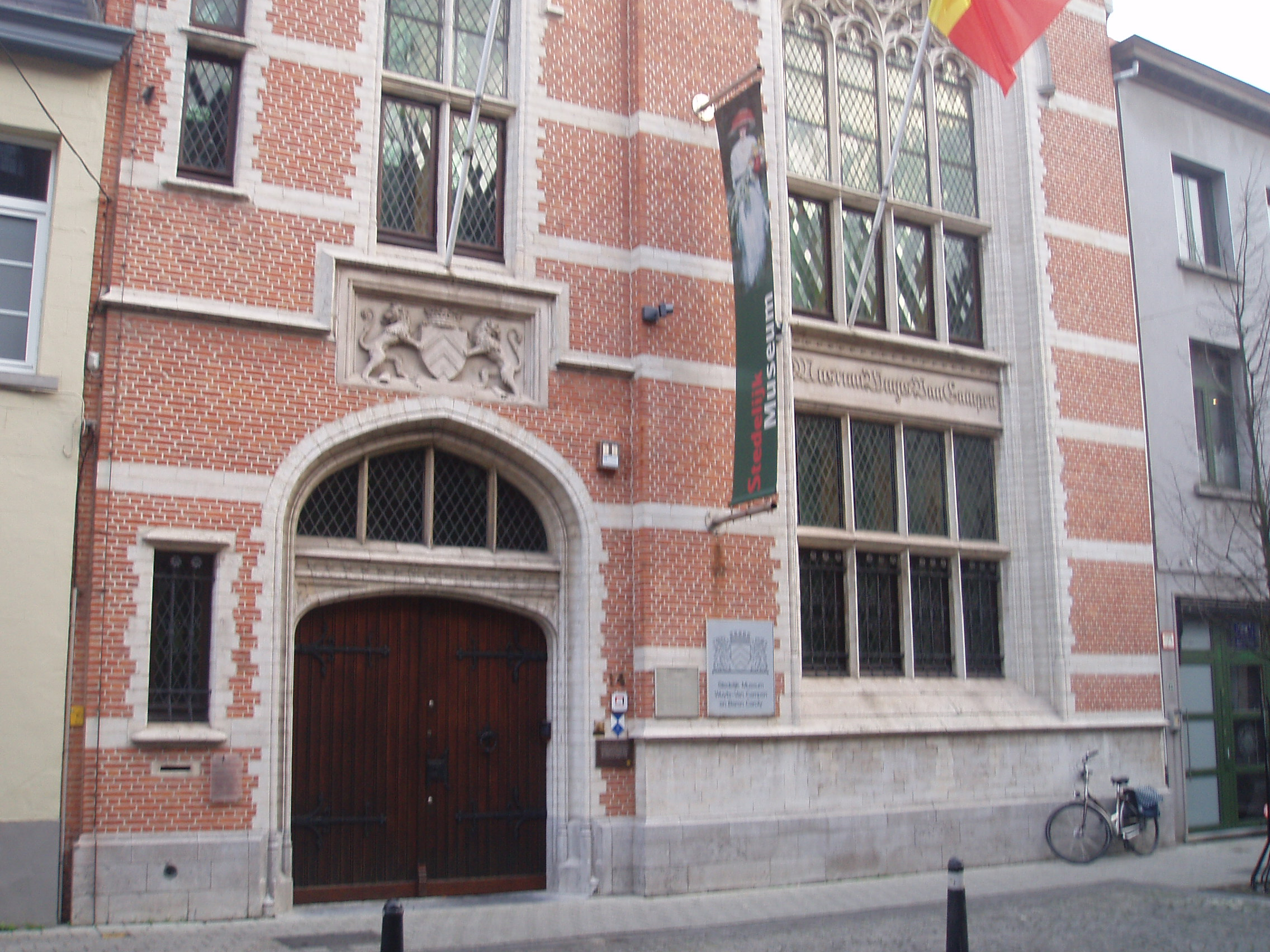
Stedelijk Museum Wuyts-Van Campen en Baron Caroly

Stedelijk Museum Wuyts-Van Campen en Baron Caroly (Dutch for ‘City Museum Wuyts-Van Campen and Baron Caroly') was a fine arts museum located in the city centre of Lier, Belgium. The permanent exhibition offered an overview of mainly Flemish, Belgian and Dutch paintings from the 16th to the 20th century. In addition, the museum holds a collection of objets d'art.

== History ==
The museum took its name from two legacies: the first by Jacob Jozef Wuyts made in 1887 and the second by Baron Georges Caroly made in 1935.

The building which houses the museum originally dates from the second quarter of the 18th century and was remodelled after a design by city architect FH Cox in the period 1891-1892. The museum was officially inaugurated on 16 October 1892. A second hall was added in 1904-1905 after a design by M. Van Ockelyen. Further expansions took place in 1936-1946 after designs by C. Sol. The museum buildings are executed in a neo-Gothic style.

The address of the museum is Florent Van Cauwenberghstraat 14, Lier, Belgium.

== Permanent collection ==
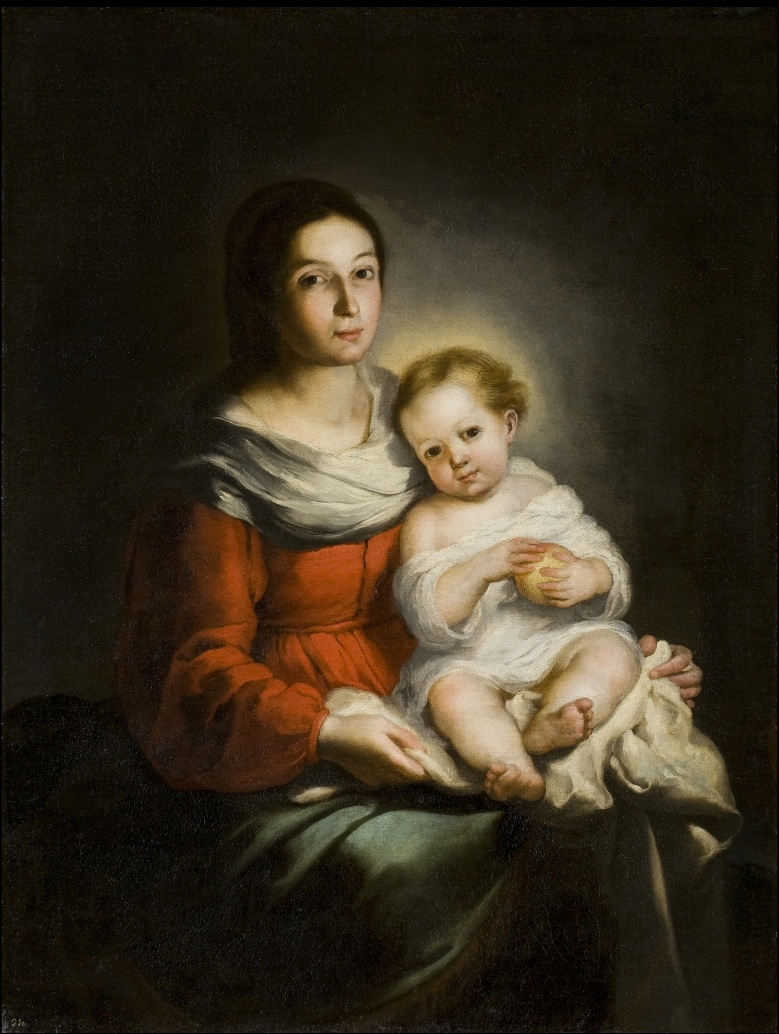
Madonna and Child by Bartolomé Esteban Murillo

The permanent exhibition offers an overview of mainly Flemish, Dutch and Belgian paintings from the 16th to the 20th centuries. Noteworthy are a number of works by Flemish masters such as Frans Floris, Pieter Brueghel the Younger, Peter Paul Rubens, and modernists such as Raymond de la Haye.

In 2009 a visiting Spanish scholar discovered that a painting of a Madonna and Child kept in the museum's storage is actually an early work by the 17th century Spanish master Bartolomé Esteban Murillo.

Besides paintings, the collection also includes drawings, prints, silver and ceramics. The collection was also expanded with around 92 drawings, including Italian works, from the Verhoeven bequest.

At the end of February 2018, the Stedelijk Museum Wuyts-Van Campen & Baron Caroly has been closed. At the end of September 2018, it was reopened as stadsmuseum Lier.
