= Huis van Alijn =

Museum in Ghent, Belgium

House of Alijn
- Huis van Alijn
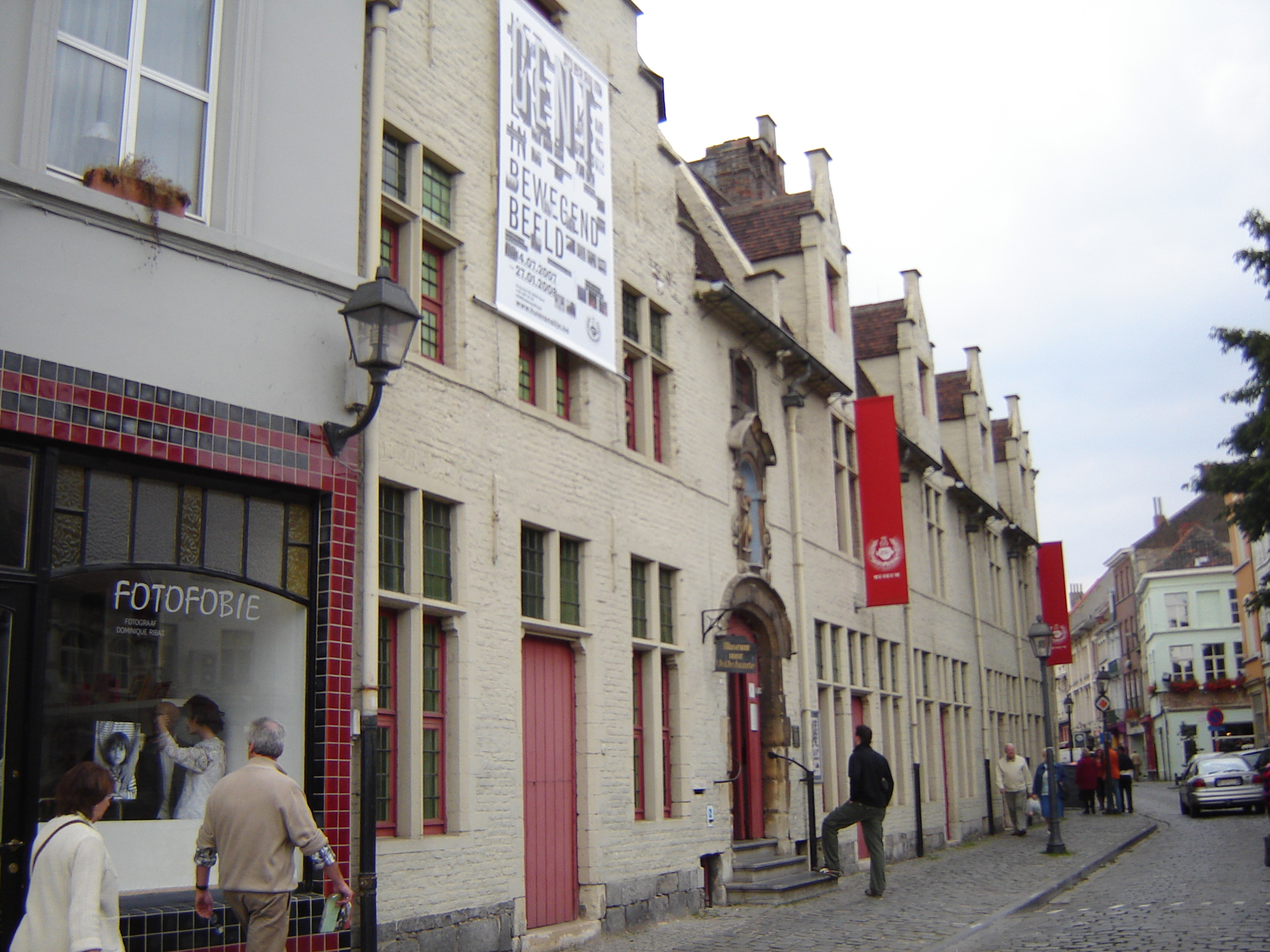
- Huis van Alijn
- Location: Ghent, Belgium
- Coordinates: 51.057338°N 3.723337°E
- Type: Cultural history
- Website: http://www.huisvanalijn.be

The Huis van Alijn (Dutch for: Alijn Hospital, literally House of Alijn) is a museum located on the Kraanlei in Ghent, Belgium. The collection revolves around local culture and daily life in the 20th century.

== History of the museum ==
The origins of the House of Alijn lie in 1926. That is when the Royal Association of East Flemish Folklorists was founded. The association aimed to promote the study of popular life. It achieved this through, among other things, the publication of the folklore magazine Oost-Vlaamse Zanten, starting in 1927, and the establishment of a folklore library. The association's collection, initially housed in the library, grew so much in the following years that a new home was required. In 1932, the Folklore Museum then saw the light of day. Ten years after its founding, the stem puppet theater Het Spelleke van Folklore, the former Spelleke van de Muide, found a home in the museum and it has remained there until today. The Folklore Museum moved from Lange Steenstraat to the Children's Alijn Hospital on Kraanlei in 1962 and was renamed the Museum of Folklore.

In terms of content, the museum's policy until well into the twentieth century was characterized by the search for insight into one's own folk nature. Static folk culture, together with language, constituted the most authentic expressions of the folk soul. The ideological abuse to which popular culture was exposed during the interwar period led to a thorough reflection on methodology after World War II and a reorientation within European folklore in the 1960s.

At the museum level, the nostalgic vision at Ghent's Museum of Folklore long persisted: faithful and eloquent reconstructions of vanished crafts, interiors and folkloric customs continued to rule the roost until the 1990s. Due to a lack of resources and vision, the Museum of Folklore had become a dormant museum. The Ghent city council addressed the situation in 1997. The malaise was remedied by transferring the management to a new non-profit organization. The first task of the completely new personnel formation was a thorough examination of the museum. This revealed that a great deal of ground had to be made up on all fronts. A focused collection policy was lacking, the research and preservation conditions of the collection were inadequate, and the presentation was outdated."

In 2000, the museum underwent its most thorough transformation to date; the Museum of Folklore became the House of Alijn. The name change heralded a new policy and a revised orientation. The concept of popular culture necessarily takes on a different meaning in a society where different cultures live side by side.
