= Museum of Image and Sound =

Museum of Image and Sound, or (in Portuguese) Museu da Imagem e do Som could refer to:

- São Paulo Museum of Image and Sound, an art museum in São Paulo, Brazil
- Museu da Imagem e do Som do Rio de Janeiro, an art museum in Rio de Janeiro, Brazil
- Museu da Imagem e do Som de Alagoas, a heritage centre and art museum in the state of Alagoas, Brazil
