= Bike Rio =

Public bicycle sharing system in Rio de Janeiro, Brazil

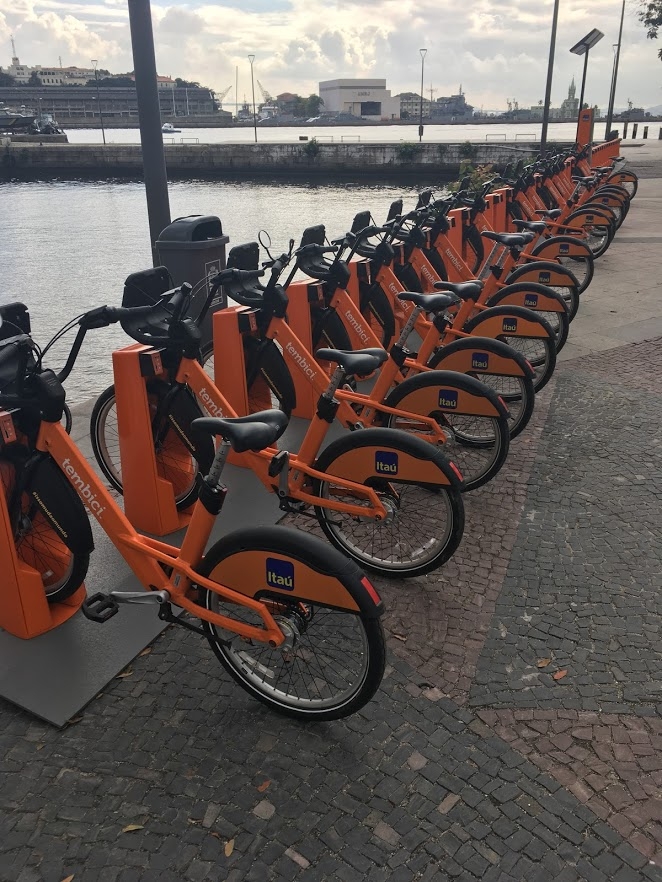
- Bike Itaú

Overview
- Area served: Rio de Janeiro, Brazil
- Transit type: Bicycle sharing system
- Website: Official website

Operation
- Began operation: 20 February 2018; 8 years ago
- Operator: PBSC Urban Solutions

Bike Itaú is a public bicycle sharing system in the city of Rio de Janeiro, Brazil. It is run by PBSC Urban Solutions and started on 20 February 2018, and is sponsored by the municipal government of Rio de Janeiro in partnership with Banco Itaú. The system replaced the old one, operated by Serttel a private concessionaire, that began operations in October 2011. The old bike sharing system had 4000 bicycles available at 400 rental stations located throughout several neighborhoods in the city. The rental stations are powered by solar panels.

== Gallery ==
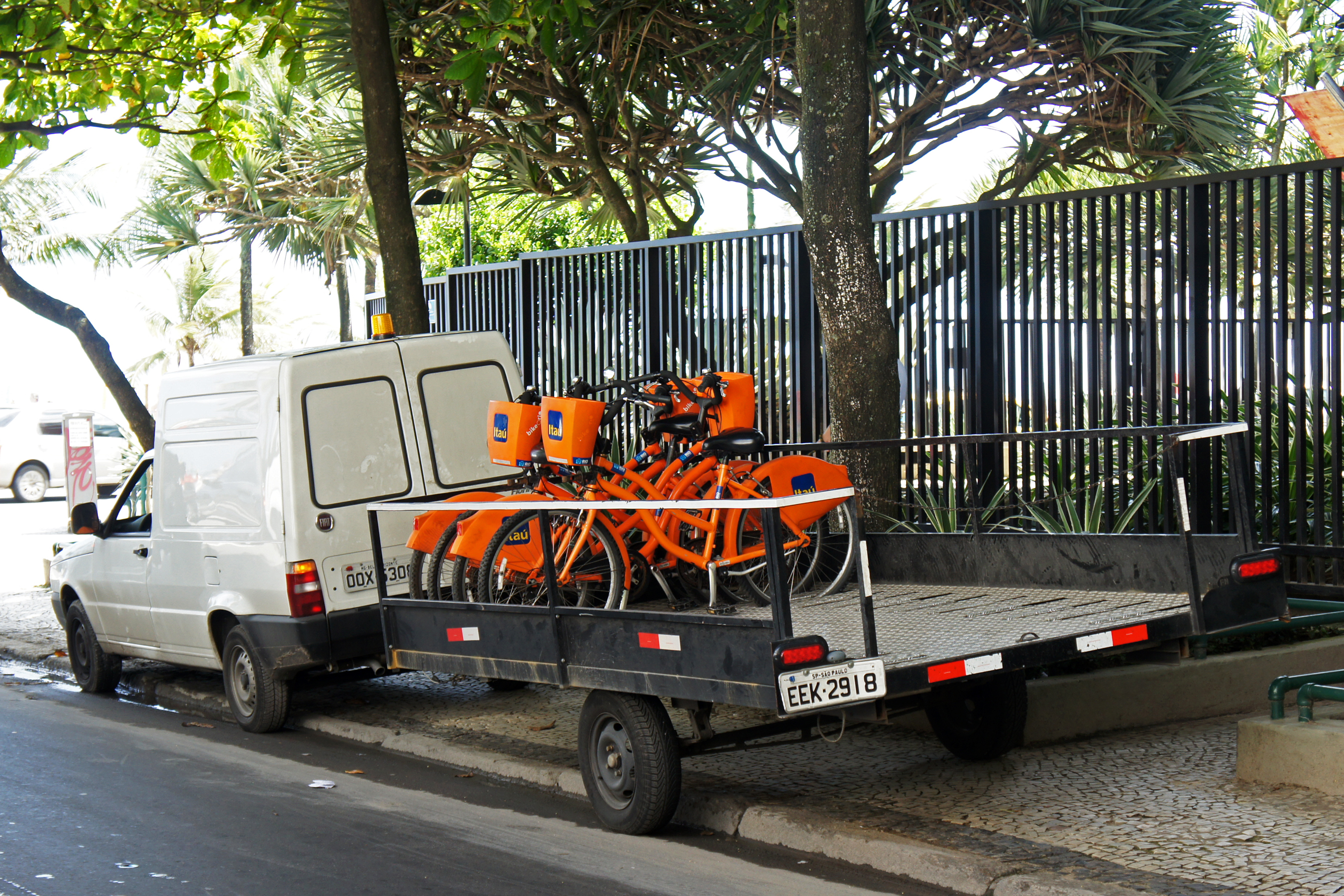
Bicycles are redistributed manually among stations to balance supply

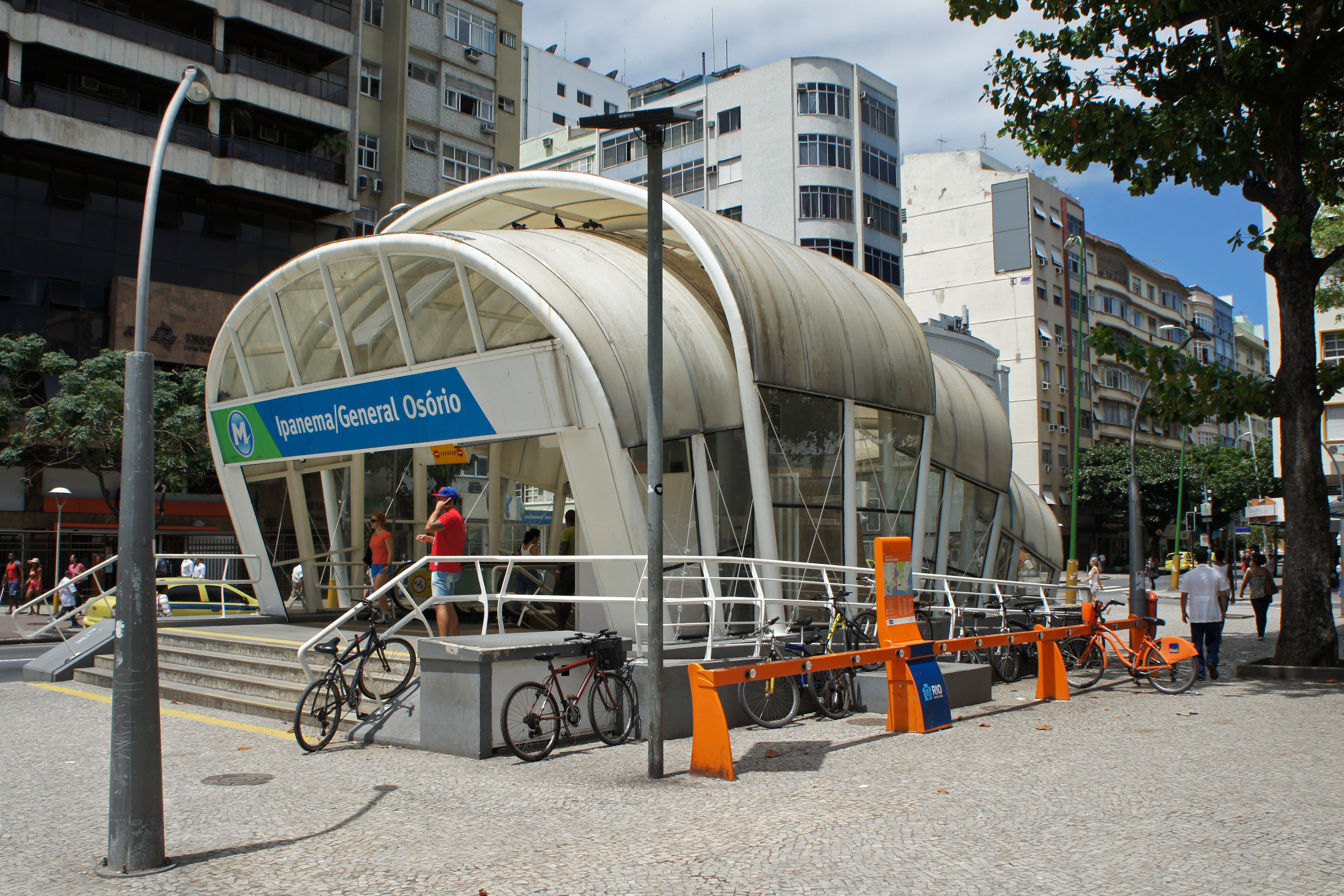
Docking station at Ipanema/General Osório Metro station

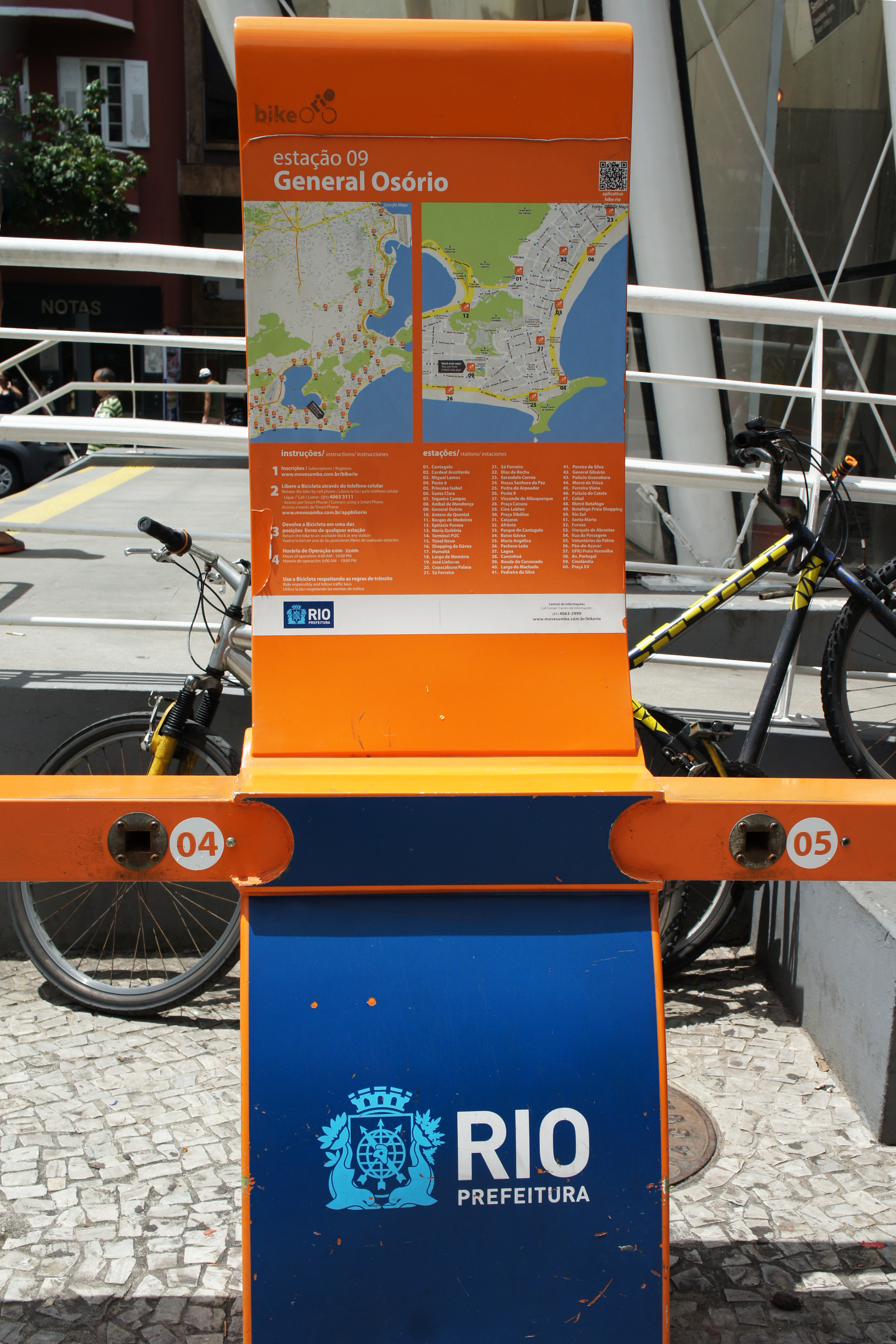
Bike Rio pay panel

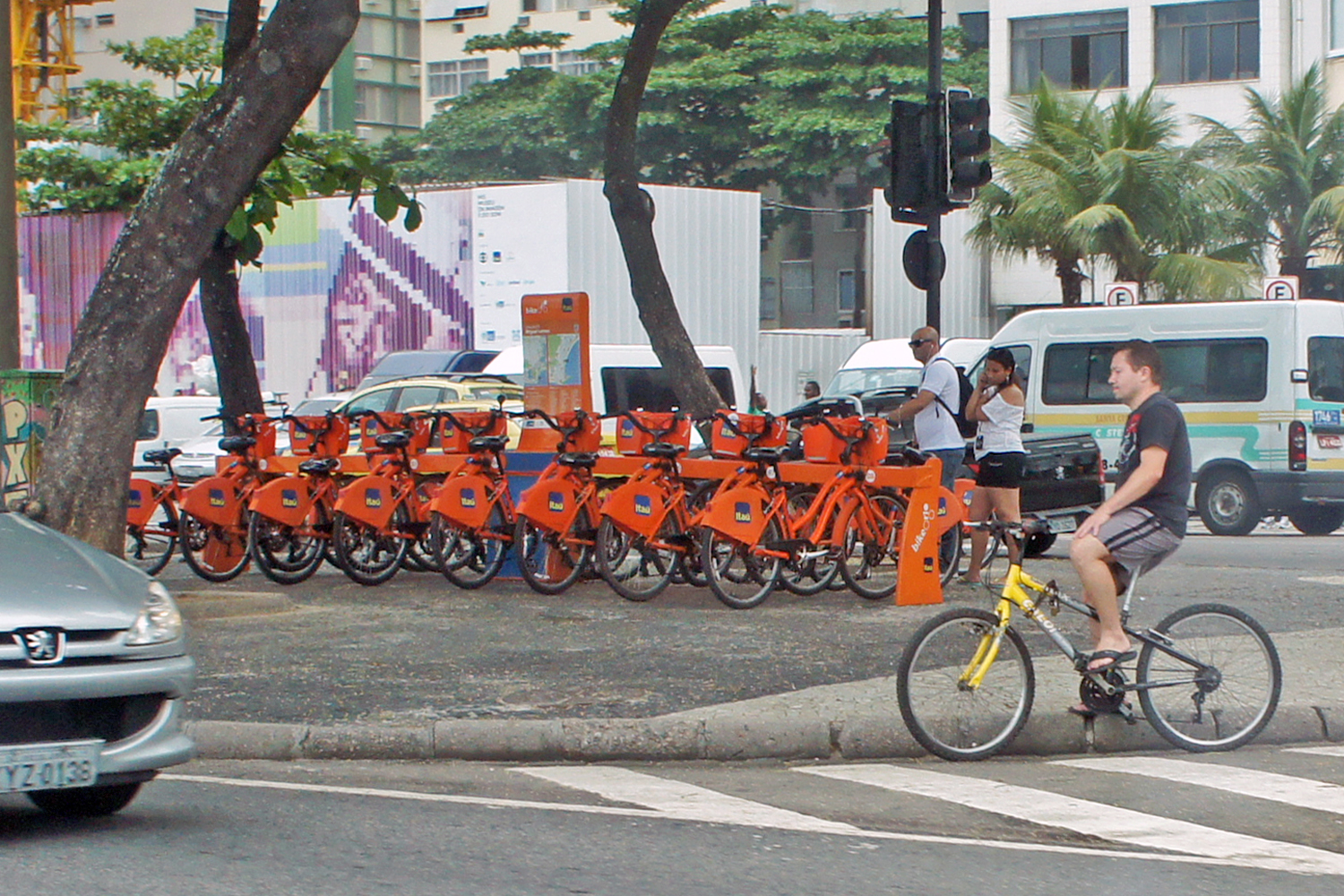
Docking station in Avenida Atlântica, Copacabana
