= Avenida Atlântica =

Street in Rio de Janeiro

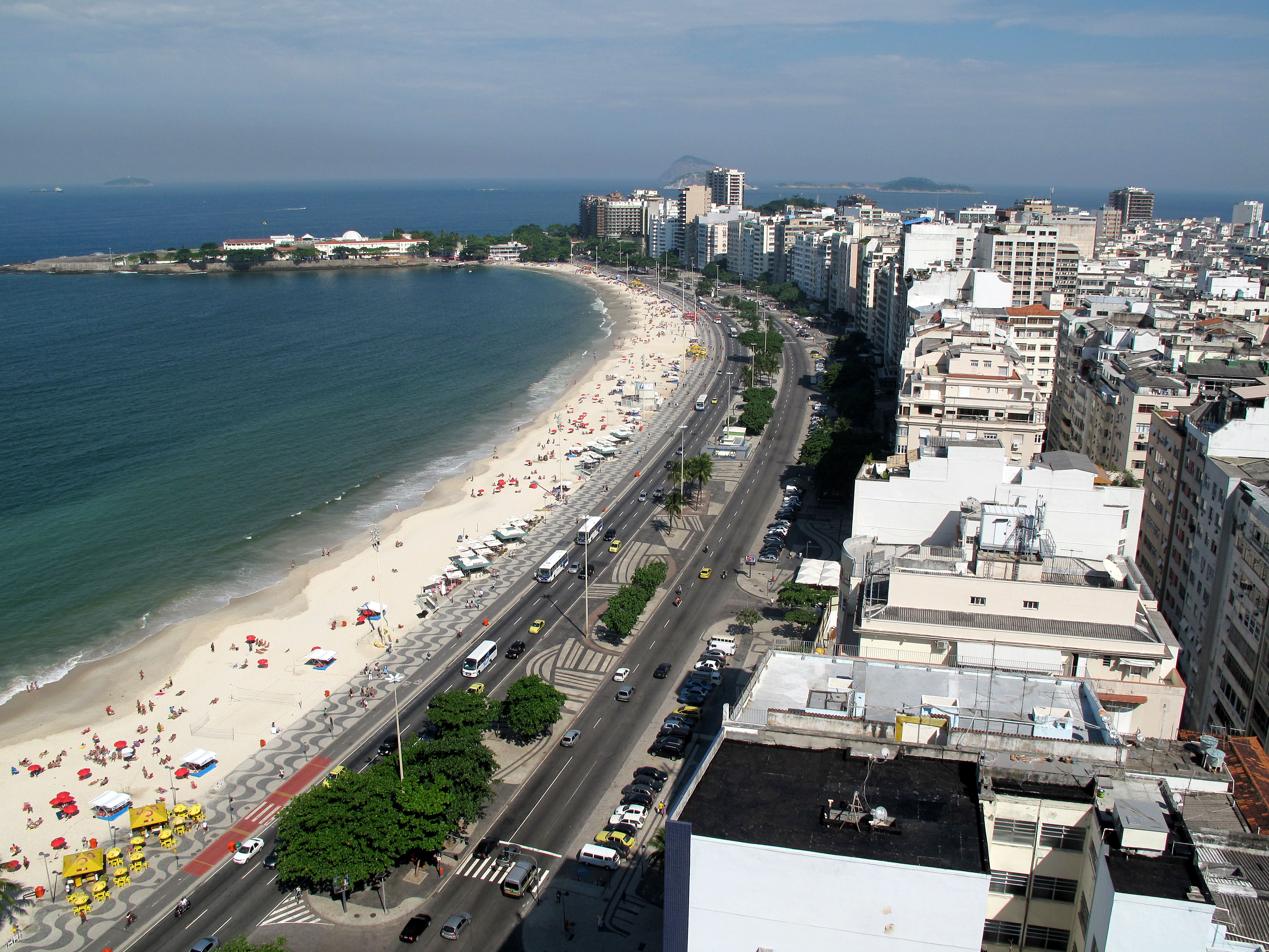
- Avenida Atlântica with the wave-patterned portuguese pavement, the bicycle lane
- Interactive map of Avenida Atlântica
- Type: Seaside avenue
- Length: 4 km (2.5 mi)
- Location: Rio de Janeiro, Brazil
- Northeast end: Forte Duque de Caxias
- South end: Forte de Copacabana

Avenida Atlântica (Portuguese for Atlantic Avenue) is a major seaside avenue in Rio de Janeiro, Brazil. It is 4 kilometres (2.5 mi) long, and spans the entire length of the neighbourhoods of Copacabana and Leme.

== Layout ==
In the stretch between its extremity in Leme and its crossing with Princesa Isabel Avenue (about 800 metres (2,600 ft) long), Avenida Atlântica has two car lanes in each direction, and from there to its Copacabana extremity, it has three lanes. It also has a portuguese pavement promenade with a wave pattern, as well as a bicycle lane between the promenade from the car lanes.

There is a military base at each of the two extremities of the avenue: Forte de Copacabana in Copacabana, and Forte Duque de Caxias in Leme. Both are owned and administered by the Brazilian army.

== Buildings ==
Avenida Atlântica is lined with residential buildings, restaurants, hotels (including the Copacabana Palace) and a few shops. Most buildings in the avenue have 11 floors, and were built with no empty space between. This is also the case in the rest of Copacabana and Leme.

== Events ==
Every year, there is a very large New Year's celebration along the entire avenue (on Copacabana Beach), which attracts hundreds of thousands of visitors. The beach is also a frequently used as a venue for free concerts and sport events, hosting the marathon swimming, triathlon and beach volleyball competitions in the 2007 Pan American Games and the same competitions in the 2016 Summer Olympics.

== Gallery ==
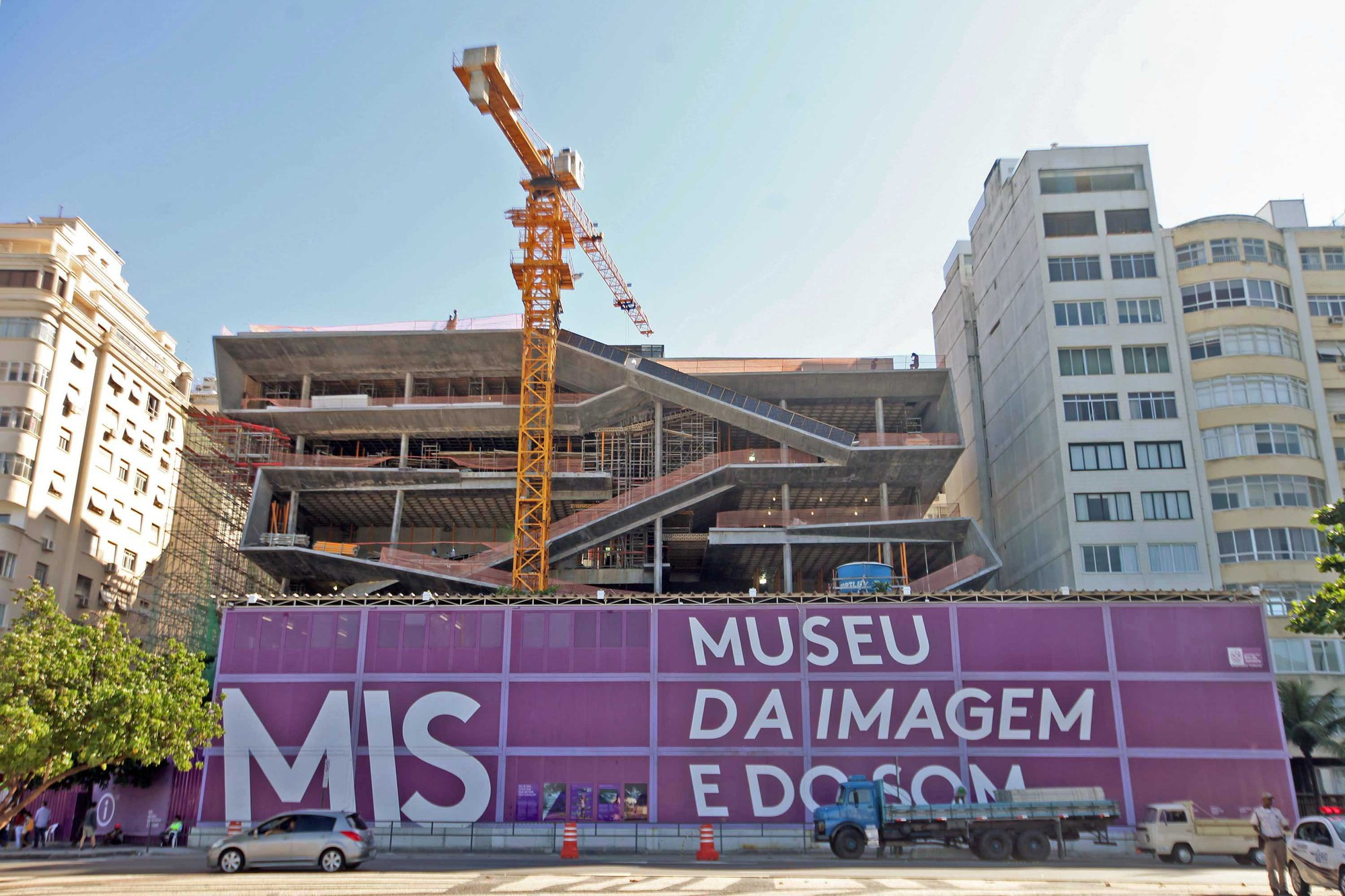
Facade of the new Museu da Imagem e do Som do Rio de Janeiro, located on Copacabana Beach, in June 2014. The new building will house all of the Carmen Miranda Museum's collection.

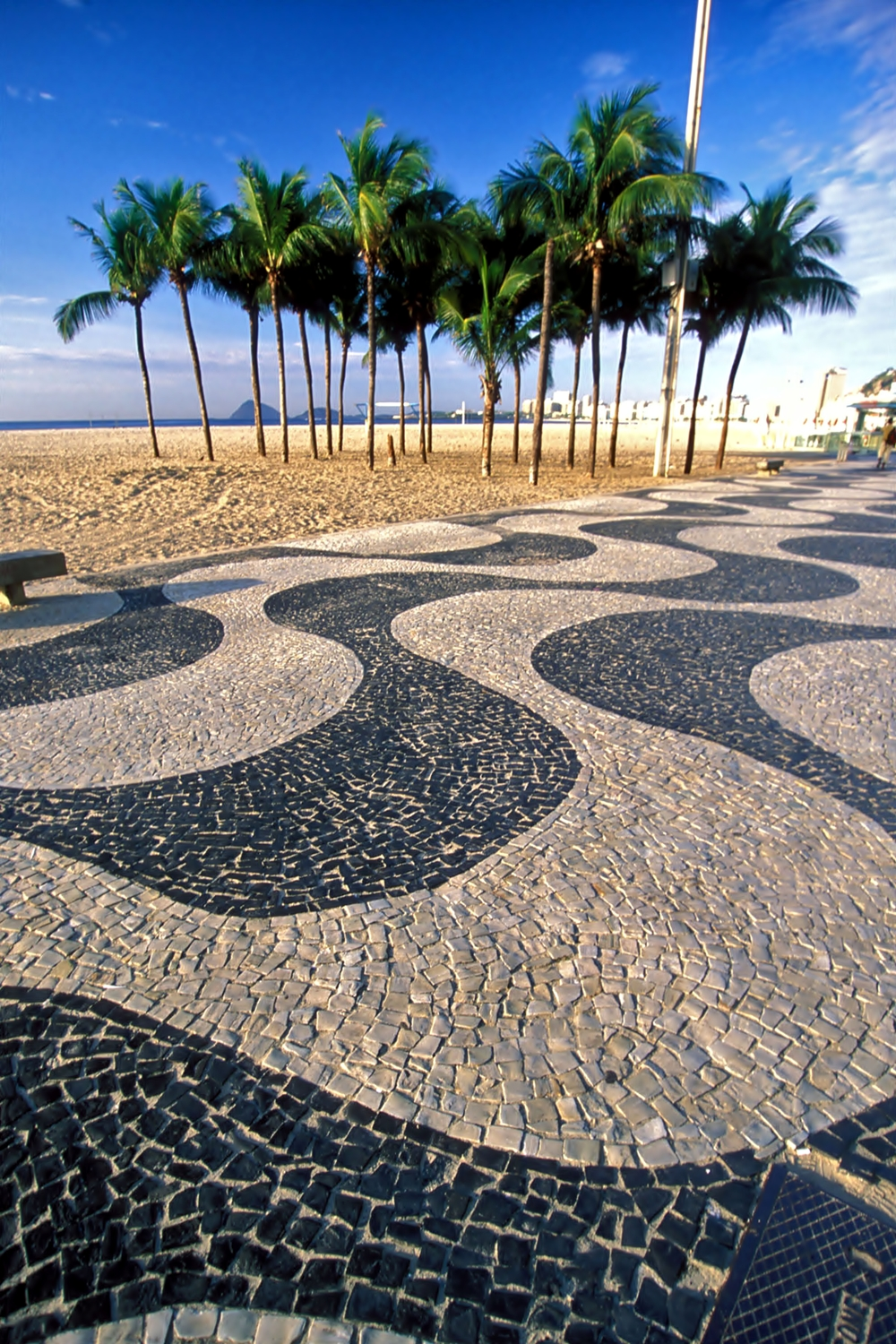
Wave-patterned Portuguese pavement in Avenida Atlântica, with the Cagarras Islands in the background.

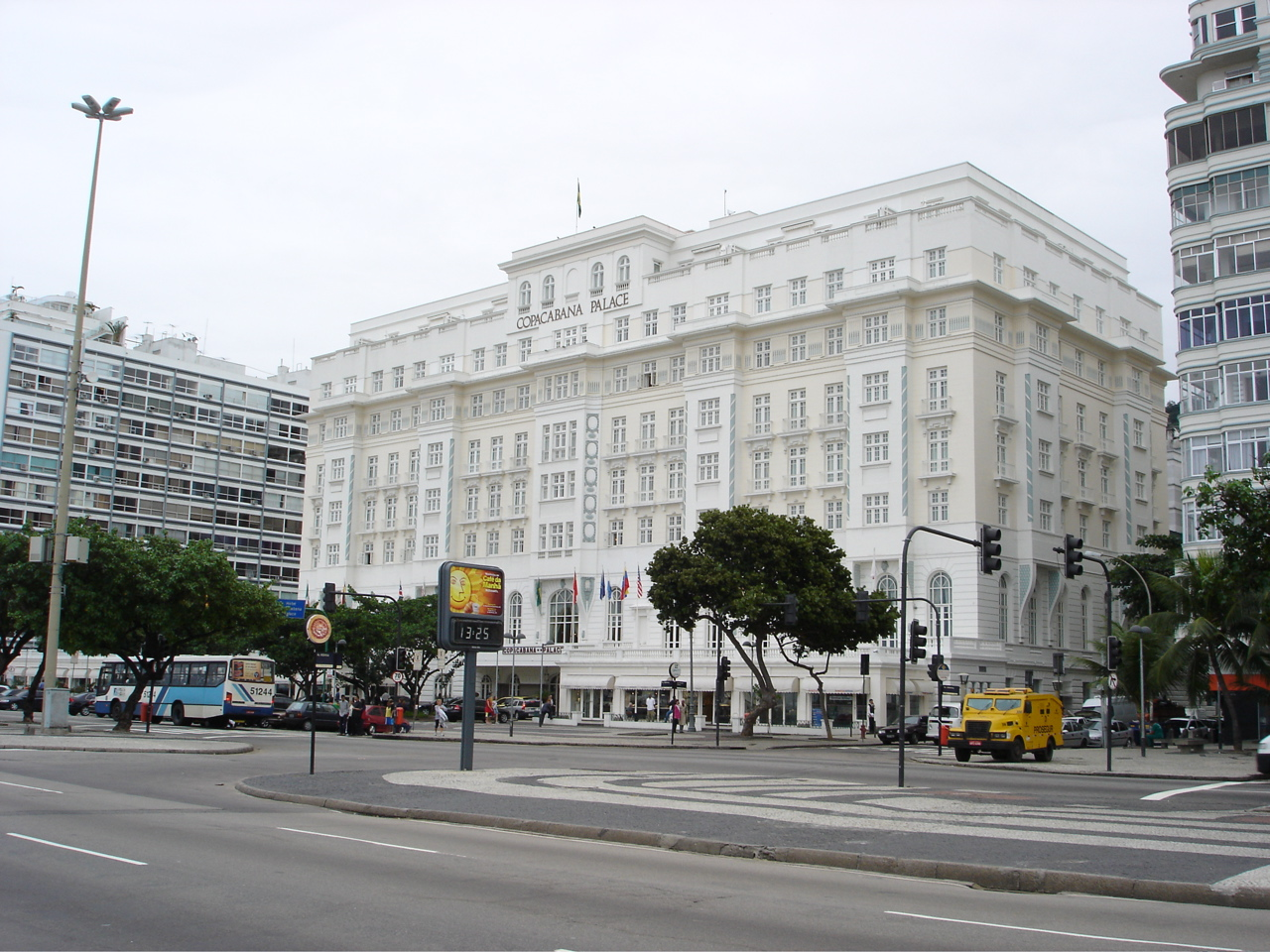
Copacabana Palace Hotel, with Avenida Atlântica in the foreground

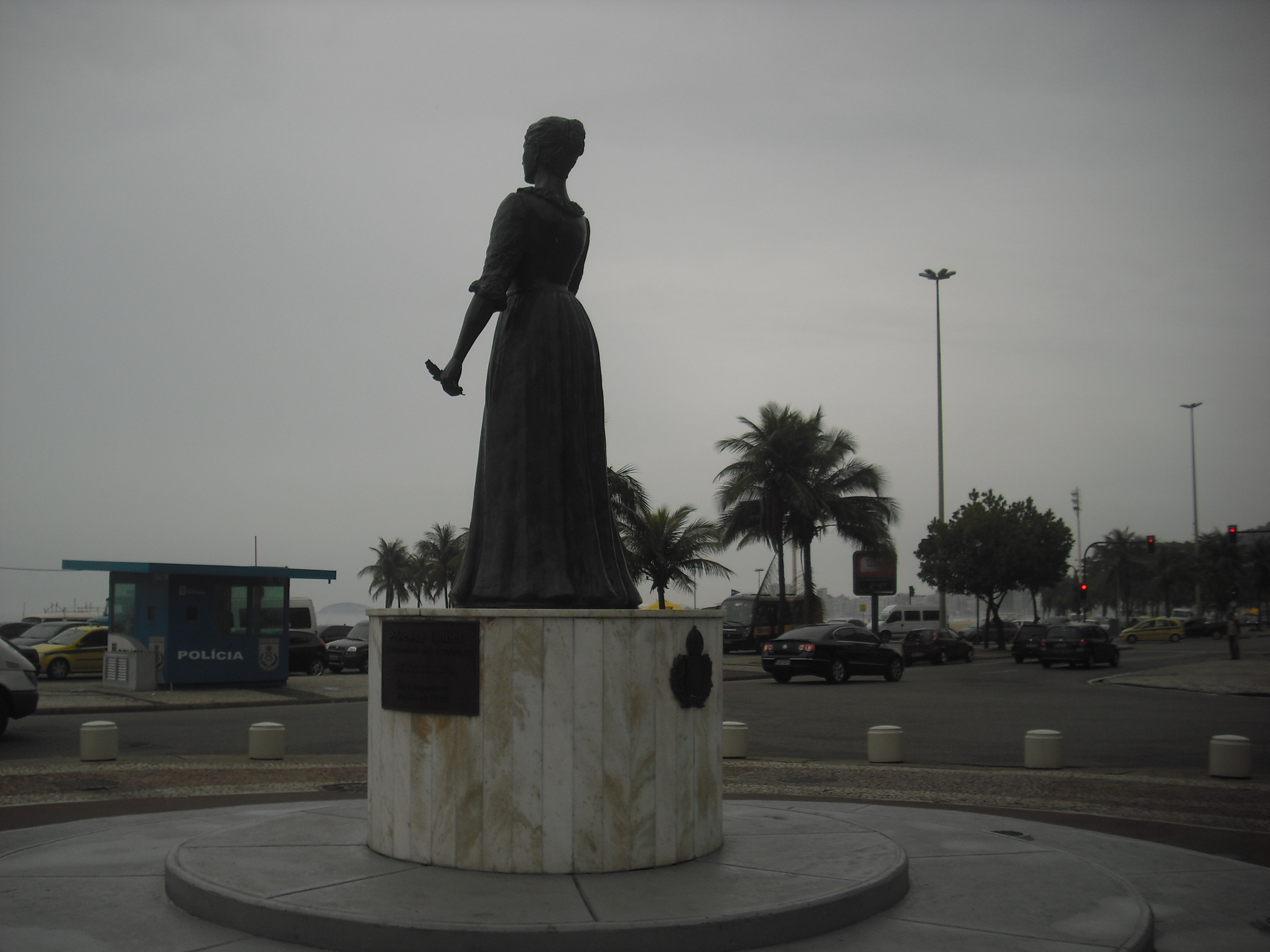
Crossing between Avenida Atlântica and Avenida Princesa Isabel, with a statue of Princess Isabel and a military police cabin.

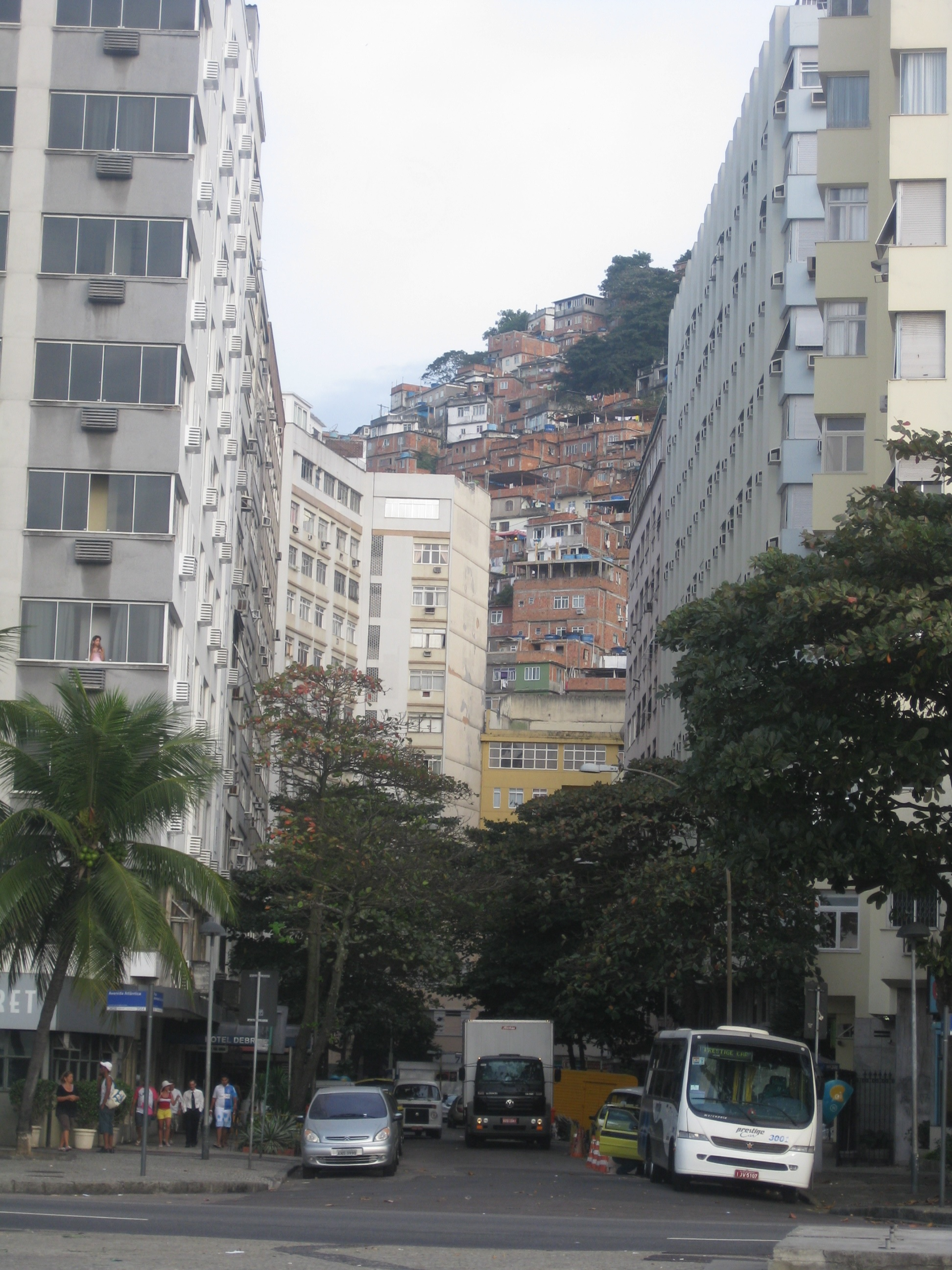
Avenida Atlântica

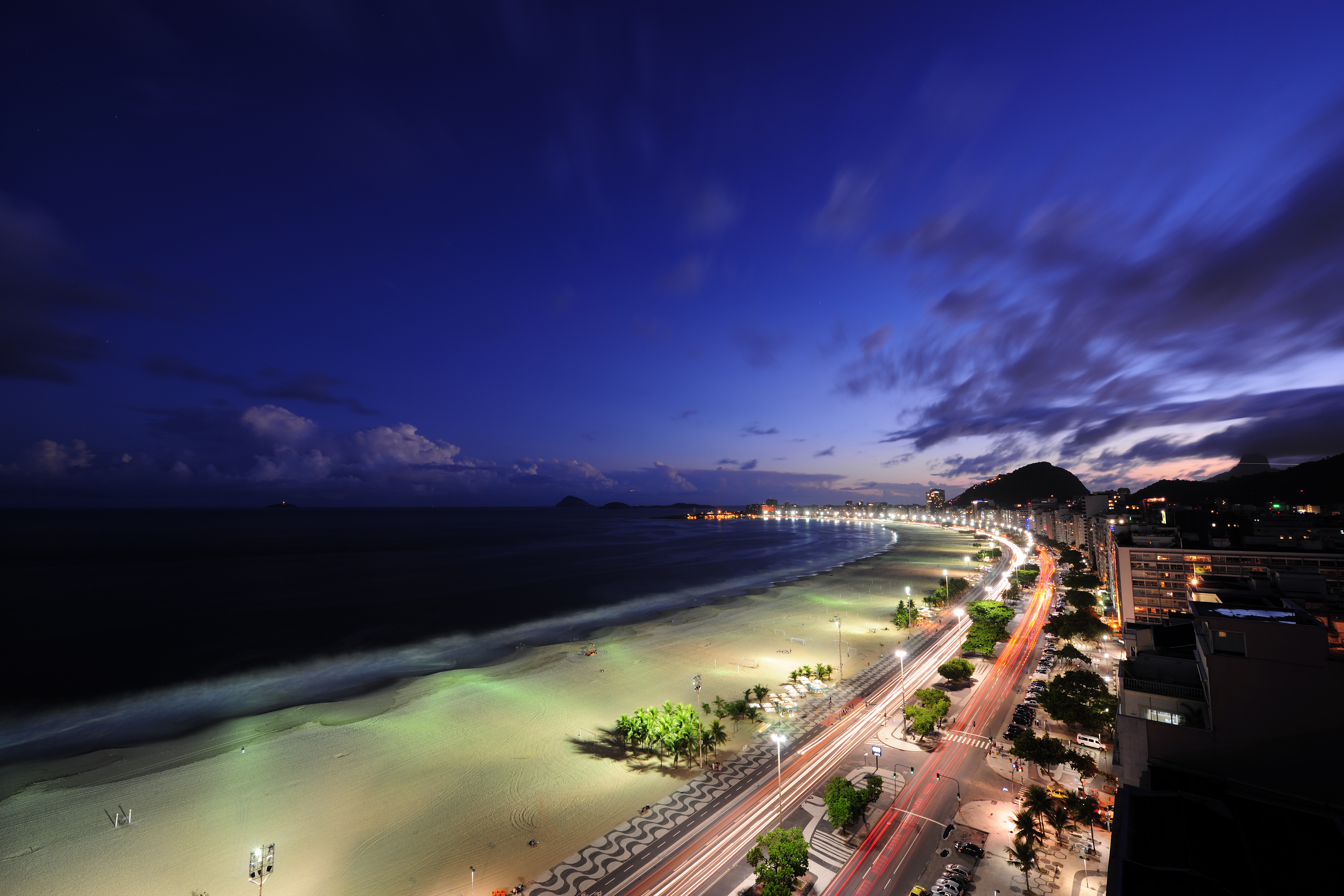
Avenida Atlântica at dusk
