= Copacabana Palace =

Hotel in Rio de Janeiro, Brazil

Copacabana Palace, A Belmond Hotel
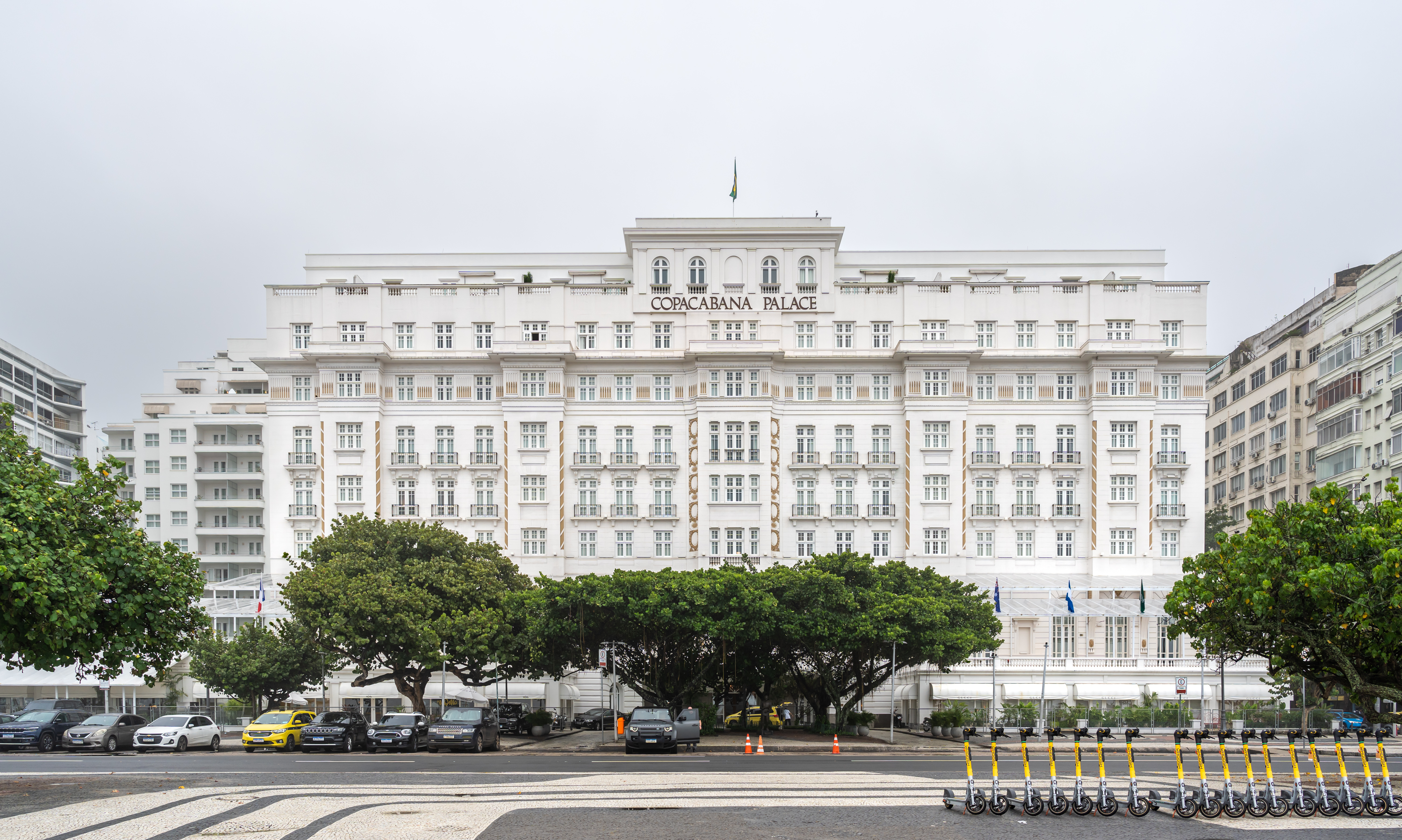
- Hotel chain: Belmond

General information
- Location: Rio de Janeiro, Brazil, 1702 Avenida Atlântica
- Coordinates: 22.966944°S 43.178611°W
- Opening: August 13, 1923
- Owner: LVMH
- Operator: Ulisses Marreiros

Technical details
- Floor count: 6
- Floor area: 12,000 m^{2} (130,000 sq ft)

Design and construction
- Architect: Joseph Gire

Other information
- Number of rooms: 243
- Number of suites: 127
- Number of restaurants: 3

Website
- Official website

The Copacabana Palace, A Belmond Hotel, is a historic luxury hotel in Rio de Janeiro, Brazil, facing Copacabana beach. Designed by French architect Joseph Gire, it opened on August 13, 1923. It is owned by Belmond Limited. It has 243 rooms (116 apartments and 127 suites), in the main and annex buildings. The hotel has been voted the best hotel in South America multiple times, including in 2009, when it won the World Travel Award.

== History ==
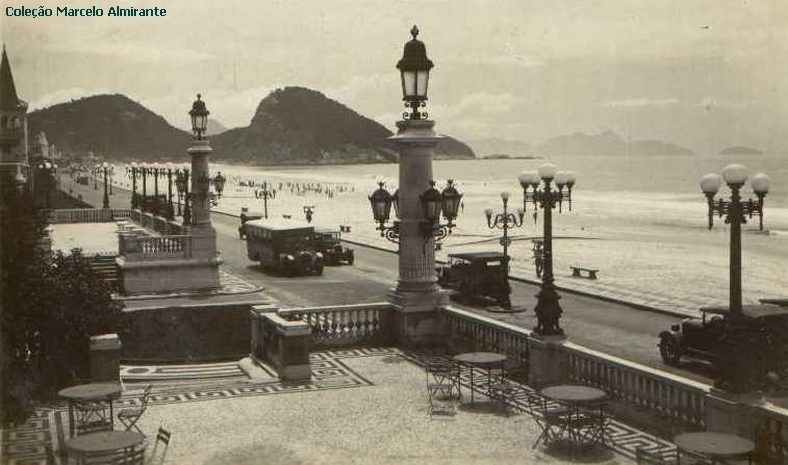
Beach view from the entrance of the Copacabana Palace in the 1930s

The Copacabana Palace was built by Octavio Guinle and Francisco Castro Silva from 1919-1923, at the initiative of President Epitacio Pessoa, who wanted a large hotel in the nation's capital to host the visitors attending the Independence Centenary International Exposition. The Federal Government granted the builders tax incentives and a casino license.

The hotel was the first large building on Copacabana beach, facing Avenida Atlântica, which had just been extended in 1919 by engineer Paulo de Frontin. French architect Joseph Gire drew inspiration from two famous hotels on the French Riviera: the Hotel Negresco, in Nice and the Carlton Hotel in Cannes. The structure was erected by engineer César Melo e Cunha.

The hotel opened on August 13, 1923, months after the exposition closed, due to numerous construction delays, caused by the difficulty of importing Carrara marble and Bohemia crystal; the complex foundation work, requiring a depth of fourteen meters; the lack of technology and experience in the country for such manufacturing; and a violent undertow that, in 1922, destroyed Avenida Atlântica, causing damage to the hotel's lower floors.

French singer, actress and vedette Mistinguett attended the grand opening. Despite having the "most beautiful legs in the world", she was prohibited from showing them at the party. Due to the delayed opening, President Artur Bernardes tried to revoke the hotel's casino license in 1924. After a ten-year legal battle, the Guinle family won the case. The hotel's casino proved essential to the hotel's success in the following decades.

On May 23, 1928, President Washington Luis was shot at the hotel by his mistress, 28-year-old Italian marquess Elvira Vishi Maurich. He was hospitalized, with what was officially called appendicitis. Four days later, the young marquess was found dead. The police report ruled it a suicide.

In 1934, the hotel added a swimming pool. In 1938, the hotel's "Golden Room" was inaugurated, with a performance by French actor, cabaret singer and entertainer Maurice Chevalier.

In April 1946, President Eurico Gaspar Dutra banned gambling in Brazil. The casino was transformed into a concert hall, and the hotel underwent a major renovation, designed by architect Wladimir Alves de Sous and completed in 1949. Overseen by engineer César Melo e Cunha, the work increased the hotel's capacity by adding a side pergola and a rear annex. The capital of Brazil was transferred to Brasília in 1960, and the hotel experienced a period of decline, as it was overtaken by more modern resort hotels in the 1970s. In 1985, the hotel faced demolition. However, the Copacabana Palace was declared a cultural property, registered at the federal (IPHAN), state (INEPAC) and municipal (SEDREPAHC) levels.

In 1989, the Guinle family, represented by José Eduardo Guinle, sold the hotel to James Sherwood, chairman of Sea Containers, a London-based shipping company with a 42% stake in Orient Express Hotels, which assumed operation of the hotel. Sherwood renovated the Copacabana Palace at great expense. In 2014, Orient Express Hotels changed its name to Belmond Limited and the hotel was renamed Copacabana Palace, A Belmond Hotel. Belmond was sold to luxury goods conglomerate LVMH in 2018.

== Famous Guests ==
Guests of the Copacabana Palace include Walt Disney, Marlene Dietrich, Ginger Rogers, Josephine Baker, Rita Hayworth, Ava Gardner, Orson Welles, Brigitte Bardot, Jayne Mansfield, Sylva Koscina, Paul McCartney, Janis Joplin, Madonna, Mick Jagger, Princess Diana and Charles III, Bono, Freddie Mercury, Carla Bruni, Halle Berry, Lana Del Rey, Justin Bieber, Miley Cyrus, Katy Perry, Lady Gaga and Barry Manilow.

== Gallery ==
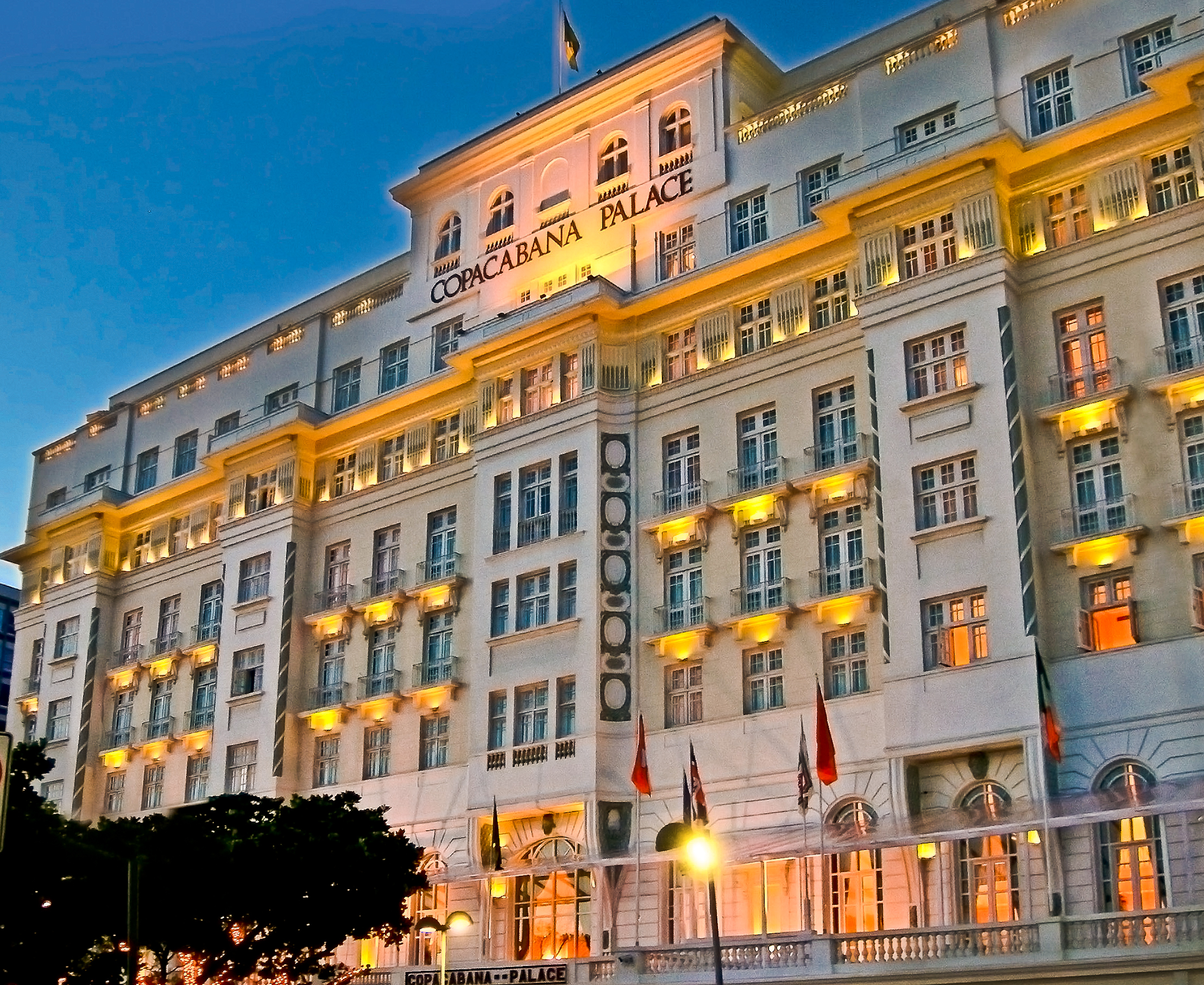
The Hotel at Sunset

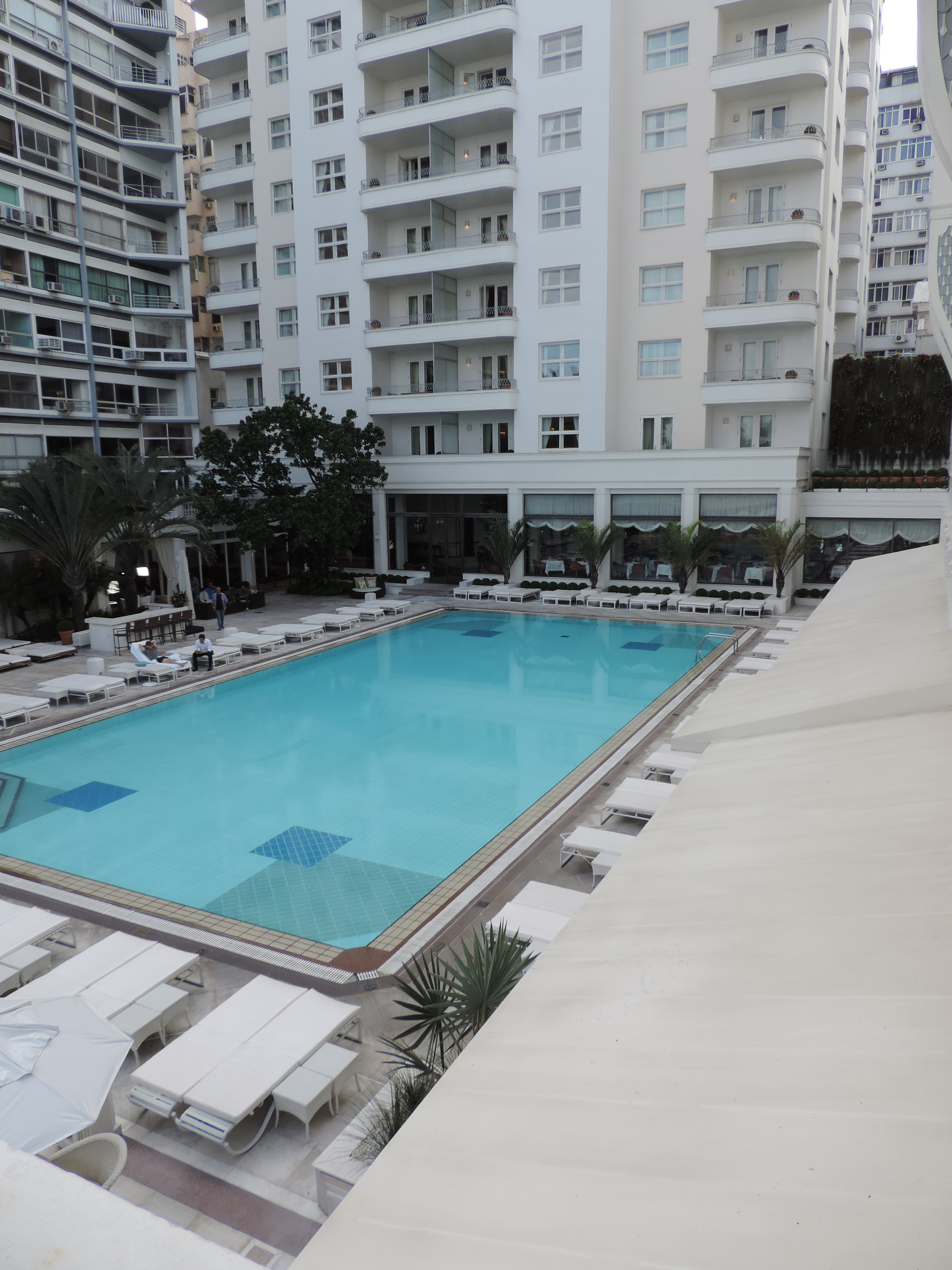
Copacabana Palace pool

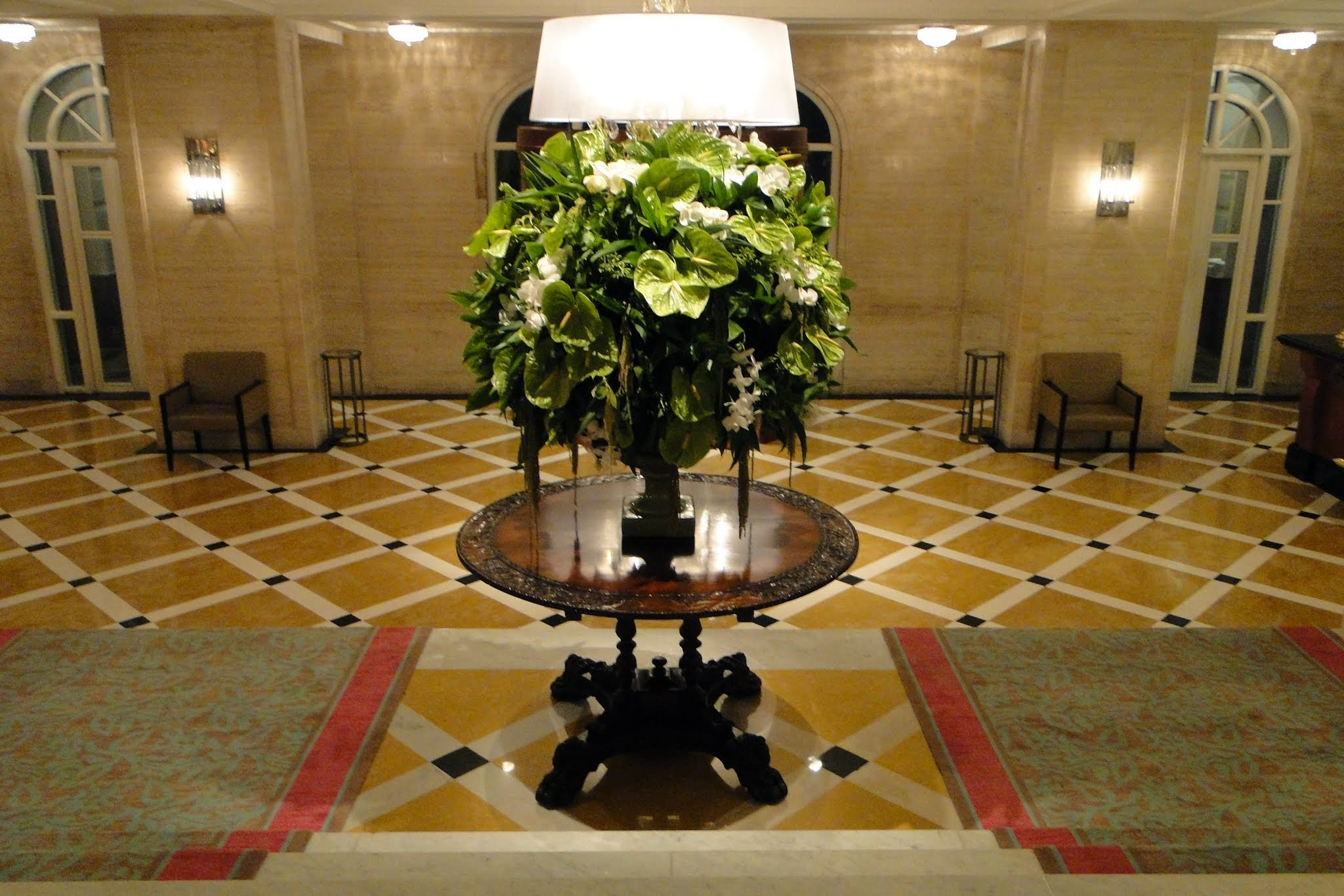
Inside the hotel
