= Museu da Imagem e do Som do Rio de Janeiro =

Museaum in Rio de Janeiro, Brazil

MIS - RJ
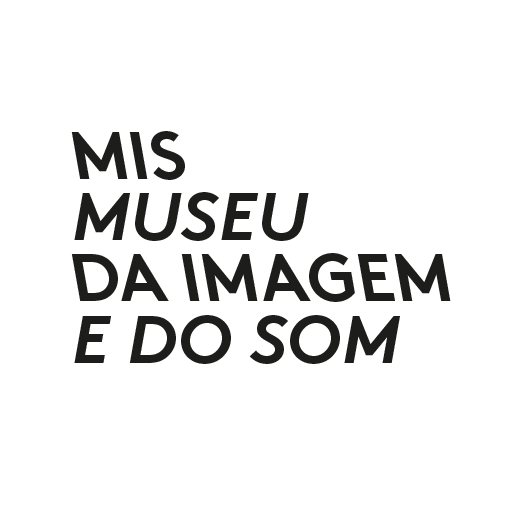
- Established: September 3, 1965; 60 years ago
- Location: Av. Atlântica, 3432; Copacabana, Rio de Janeiro, Brazil
- Director: Rosa Maria Araujo
- Website: www.mis.rj.gov.br

The Museu da Imagem e do Som do Rio de Janeiro (in English, Rio de Janeiro Museum of Image and Sound) was inaugurated on September 3, 1965, as part of celebrations of the fourth centenary of the city of Rio de Janeiro. The MIS is a museum of the Secretary of Culture of the state of Rio de Janeiro dedicated to carioca culture.

The institution has launched a pioneering gender audiovisual museum, which would be followed in other Brazilian cities. In addition to having qualified as music and picture documentation center, it was also a cultural center of avant-garde in the 1960s and 1970s, a place of meetings and launching new ideas and behaviors. Currently, the MIS has its administrative headquarters in Lapa and a unit at Praça XV in the same region.

The building of the new headquarters of MIS, in Copacabana was announced in 2009, in the place of the old nightclub Help, an old point of prostitution in the city. The building will also house the Carmen Miranda Museum collection, now located in the Flamengo Park. The inauguration is scheduled for 2018.

== History ==
In addition to the safekeeping and preservation of the collections, the MIS produces its own collection by collecting testimonies for posterity, project conceived in 1966 as a way to legitimize the action of the museum in the cultural milieu of Rio de Janeiro. Currently, the museum has a collection of more than 900 interviews with approximately four thousand hours of recording covering the various segments of culture. The MIS is not restricted to guard remaining objects from the past, but it is up to date with the present and facing the future. Records and preserves the memory by making use of technologies available each season. The museum, which currently has its collections split between two locations – one in Praça XV (Centro) and the other in Lapa – is seen as an important part of Rio’s cultural heritage.

== New Museu da Imagem e do Som ==
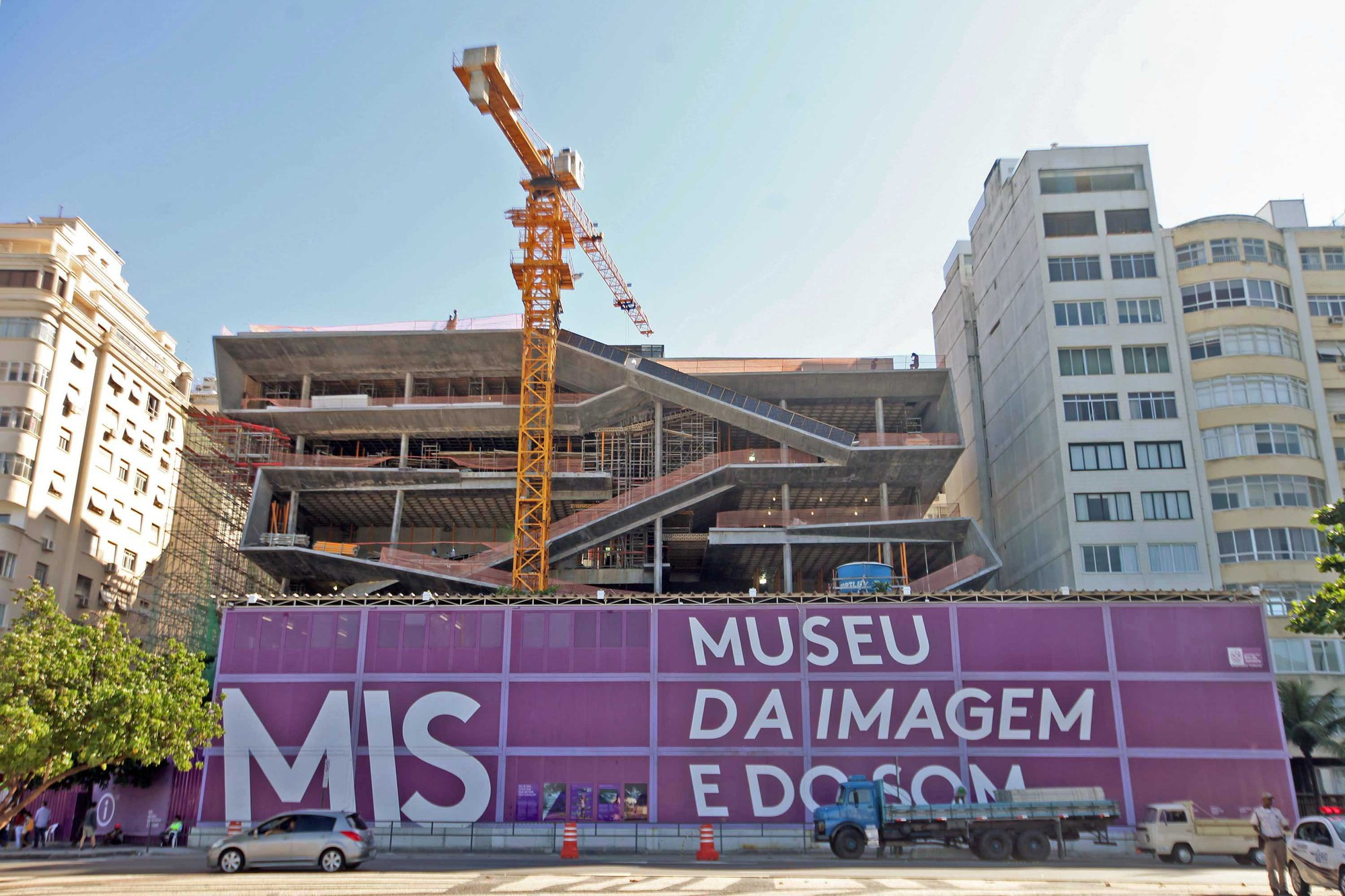
Facade of the new museum in June 2014.

The plans for the new MIS are ambitious and building costs are said to be in the region of R$70 million. Designed by Diller Scofidio + Renfro, of New York City, the new building is “a reproduction of the famous Copacabana sidewalk folded into a vertical boulevard and will become a new icon in Rio’s cultural scene.”

The new headquarters of the Museum of Image and Sound will celebrate the culture and musical history of Rio de Janeiro throughout its eight floors. The first floor of the building will be dedicated to humor and irreverence Rio, while the second floor will tell the history of music in the city, including samba and choro. The third floor will honor Brazilian television as well as Carmen Miranda, incorporating the entire museum collection dedicated to the singer, currently located at Parque do Flamengo. In other floors, visitors circulate through images of the urban evolution of the city. The museum's basement will house a multipurpose room, and the terrace receive outdoor cinema sessions. The new headquarters of the museum is an achievement of the Government of Rio de Janeiro, through the Secretary of State for Culture, with the support of the Secretary of State for Works/Public Works Company (EMOP), made in partnership with the Roberto Marinho Foundation.

The project has direct investment of the Government of Rio de Janeiro, through its own resources and of the State Law of Cultural Incentive, and financing of the Tourism Development Program (PRODETUR) and Investment Support United (PROINVEST). The project also includes Rede Globo, Itaú and Natura as patrons and sponsored by Vale, IBM, AmBev and Light, the support of the Votorantim Group, NHJ of Brazil and the Ministry of Culture, through the Federal Law of Cultural Incentive.

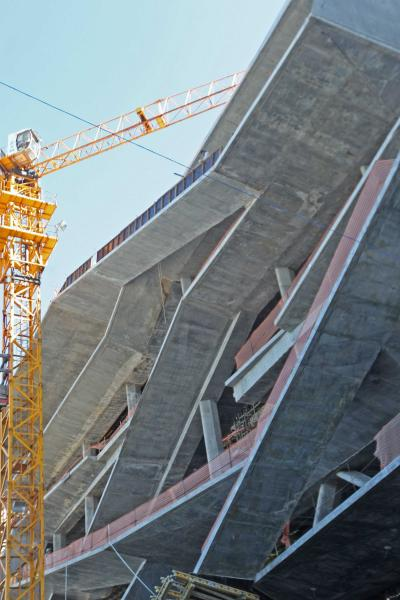
Museum's facade detail.

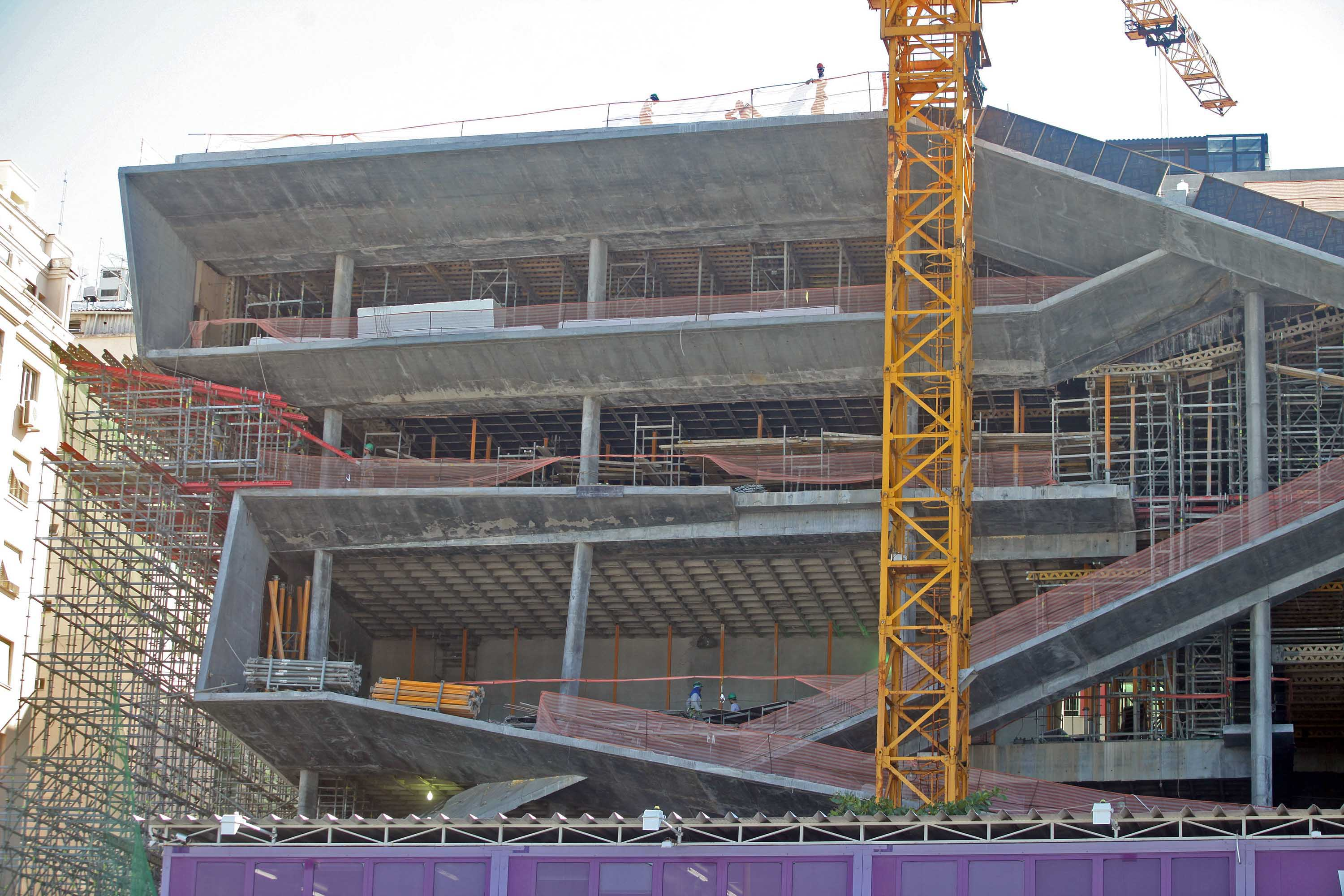
Architectural design proposes a building that, in a graphical representation, is a reproduction of the famous boardwalk of Copacabana, and folded into a vertical boulevard.

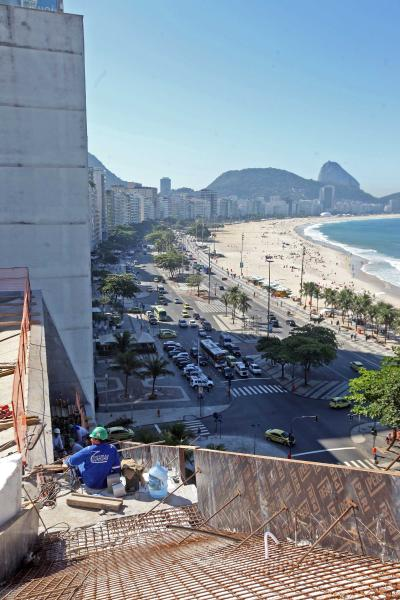
View of one of the floors of the MIS, with Copacabana Beach in background.

== Collection ==
The Museum's collection of Image and Sound contains 304,845 documents between discs, scores, photos, letters, texts and videos, and 18,000 records of Radio Nacional, with songs, novels and scripts for programs of the years 30s, 40s and 50s. Also part of the archive, the personal collection of radio journalist Almirante, of the musicians Abel Ferreira and Jacob do Bandolim, of the researchers music Sérgio Cabral and Hermínio Bello de Carvalho, and interpreters of Brazilian popular music, as the sisters Linda and Dircinha Batista, Nara Leão, Elizeth Cardoso and Zeze Gonzaga.

== See also ==
- List of music museums
- Carmen Miranda Museum
