= Carmen Miranda Museum =

Museum in Rio de Janeiro, Brazil

Coordinates: 22.9416°S 43.1722°W

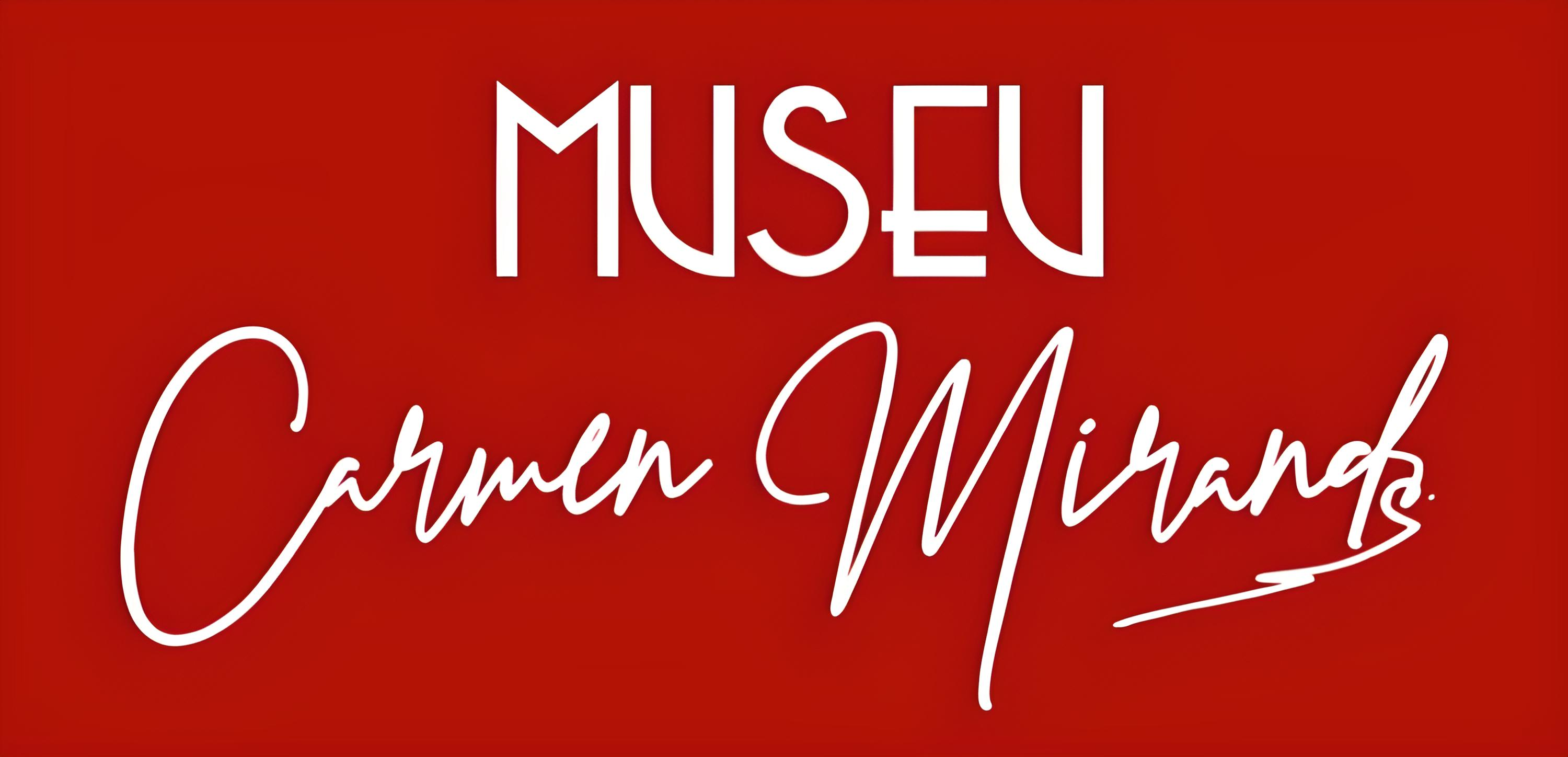

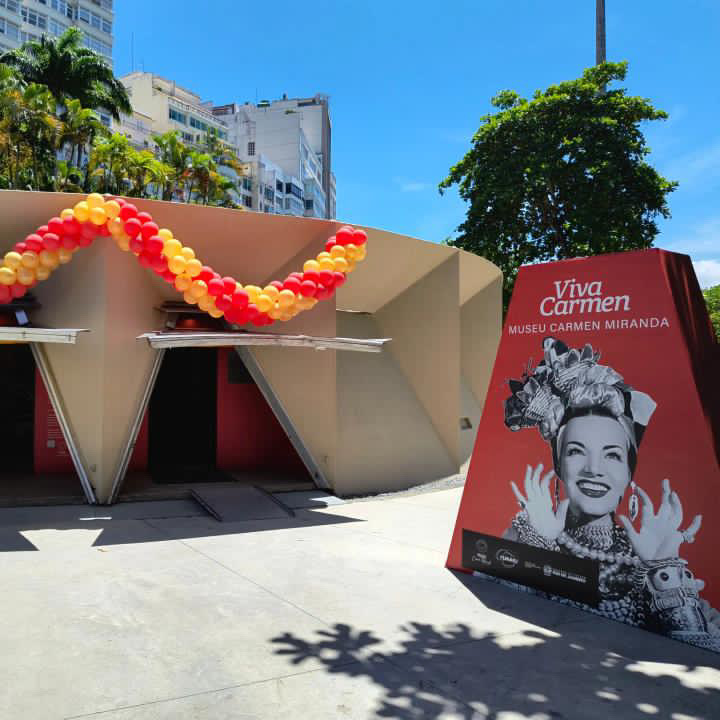
- The museum entrance.
- Established: August 5, 1976
- Location: Rio de Janeiro, Brazil
- Visitors: 10,000 /year
- Director: César Soares Balbi
- Website: Carmen Miranda Museum

The Carmen Miranda Museum (Museu Carmen Miranda), located in Brigadeiro Eduardo Gomes Park (Flamengo Park), is dedicated to honoring the life and career of singer and actress Carmen Miranda. Open to the public since 1976, the museum was officially inaugurated on the 21st anniversary of her death.

The museum was closed to visitors in 2013 but reopened to the public on August 4, 2023, following renovation work. Part of its collection—168 items, including turbans, costumes, and various accessories—is available for online viewing on the “We Wear Culture” platform, launched by Google Arts & Culture.

== History ==
The Carmen Miranda Museum was officially established in 1956 by a decree signed by Francisco de Lima Negrão, then-Governor of the Federal District. However, it wasn’t inaugurated until twenty years later, on August 5, 1976, by Rio de Janeiro Governor Floriano Peixoto Faria Lima. Located in Flamengo Park, the circular building was originally designed by architect Affonso Eduardo Reidy and later adapted by architect Ulisses Burlemaqui.

The structure was initially built as a pavilion for the Morro da Viúva playground and was part of a larger recreational area for children, in line with the Aterro do Flamengo urbanization plan drawn up in 1962. The building features a circular floor plan, 22 meters in diameter, with an inner courtyard that enhances natural lighting and ventilation. Its facade consists of exposed concrete folds that provide structural support, with variable cantilevers and two tilting doors serving as entrances.

The museum holds the world’s largest collection of original items used by Carmen Miranda, including her costumes, jewelry, and personal belongings. It also houses a wealth of textual and iconographic documentation, offering a comprehensive look at her life and career. Among the 3,560 items in the collection are film scripts with her handwritten notes, newspaper and magazine clippings, her iconic bracelets, the skirt she wore at the Broadway premiere of her show in the U.S., the outfit she wore during her tribute at Grauman’s Chinese Theatre, and the costume from her final performance in 1955.

In 2009, the State Government of Rio de Janeiro announced the construction of a new headquarters for the Museum of Image and Sound (MIS) in Copacabana. This new space will include a dedicated section for Carmen Miranda, where more than 90 original items from her personal archive will be on display.

== Collection ==
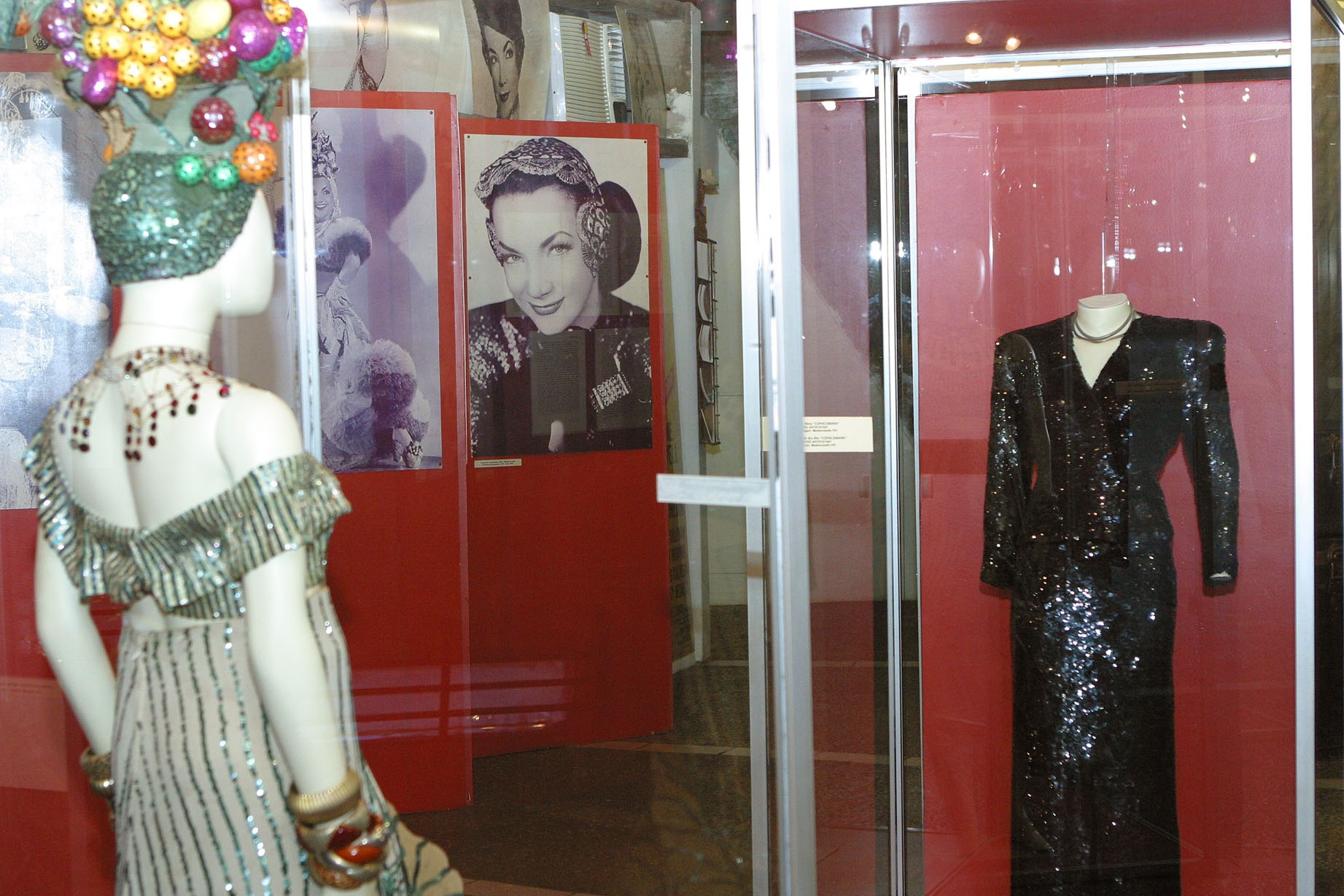
Original dresses and photographs of Carmen Miranda are exhibited at the museum.

The museum’s collection began with donations from Carmen Miranda’s family and currently holds 3,560 items. These include 461 pieces of clothing—among them jewelry, 11 complete costumes from stage shows and films, belts, platform shoes, and turbans. Additionally, the collection features 1,900 pieces of sheet music, manuscripts, scripts, 710 photographs, and film posters. However, most of these items are not part of the museum’s permanent exhibition.

In 2013, the state government of Rio de Janeiro, through the Secretary of Culture, announced the restoration of 454 objects from the museum’s collection. Among these are costumes worn in the films Copacabana (1947) and Scared Stiff (1953), as well as outfits used in performances in England, Cuba, and the United States. One notable piece is the costume Carmen Miranda wore on The Jimmy Durante Show on the night of August 4, 1955—her final recorded performance.

In February 2009, the museum launched the celebration of Carmen Miranda’s birth centennial. To mark the beginning of the centennial year, the museum unveiled a life-size resin statue of Carmen, created by artist Ulysses Rabelo. Rabelo based his work on her death mask and dental arch to ensure accuracy. The statue is dressed in the actual costume she wore in the film That Night in Rio (1941).

For many years, Cecilia Miranda de Carvalho—one of Carmen’s sisters—served as the manager of the museum’s collection.

=== Permanent Exhibition ===
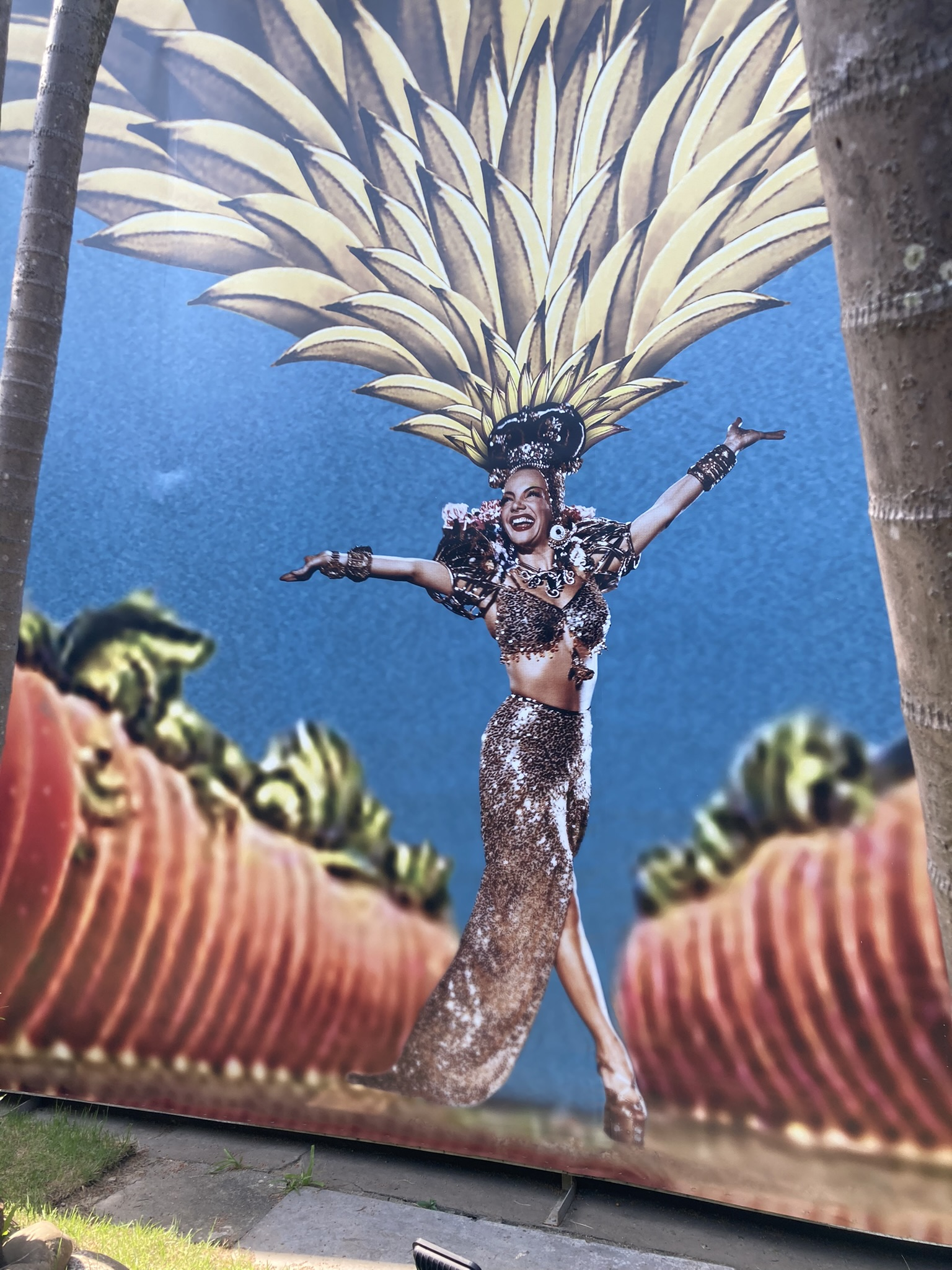
The museum’s inner garden.

A large number of Carmen Miranda’s publicity photos are displayed at near life-size, alongside smaller images that trace the story of her life and career. Also on display is the outfit she wore to the 1941 Academy Awards ceremony, as well as various pieces of jewelry and accessories—including her iconic tall fruit hats. The museum also features a substantial collection of video documentaries, biographies, the films she starred in, and compilations of her songs.

Highlights of the exhibition include Carmen Miranda and David Alfred Sebastian’s marriage certificate (1947), an honorary mention from the U.S. government recognizing her contributions during World War II, and a program from the show A Night in Rio at the Waldorf Astoria in New York (1939). Other documents on display help illustrate the full scope of her career and cultural impact.

The museum also holds a valuable collection of musical scores, totaling 980 items. Of particular note are 80 printed scores from the 1930s, which reflect the musical landscape of her early career.

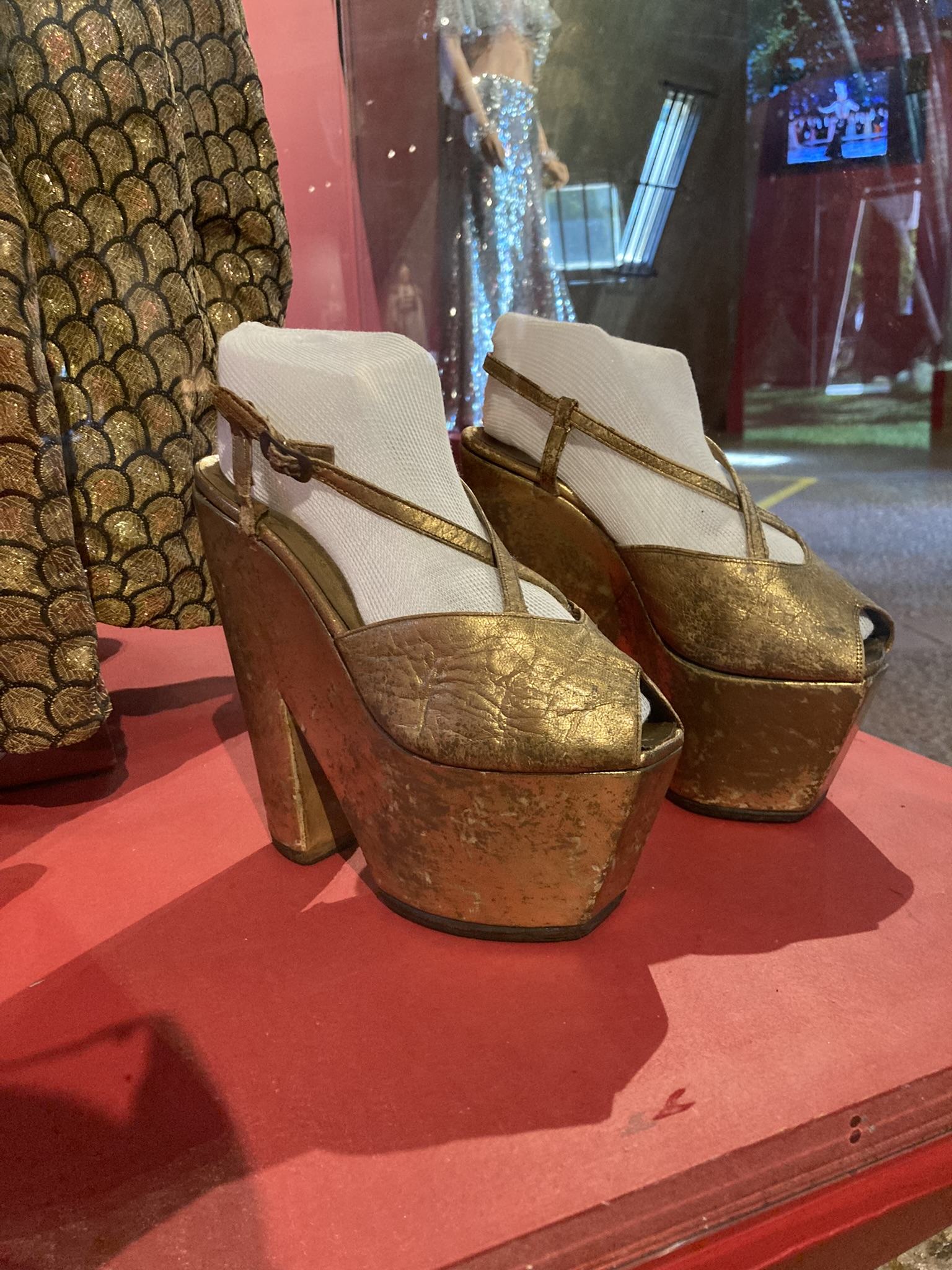
Carmen Miranda's platform shoes.

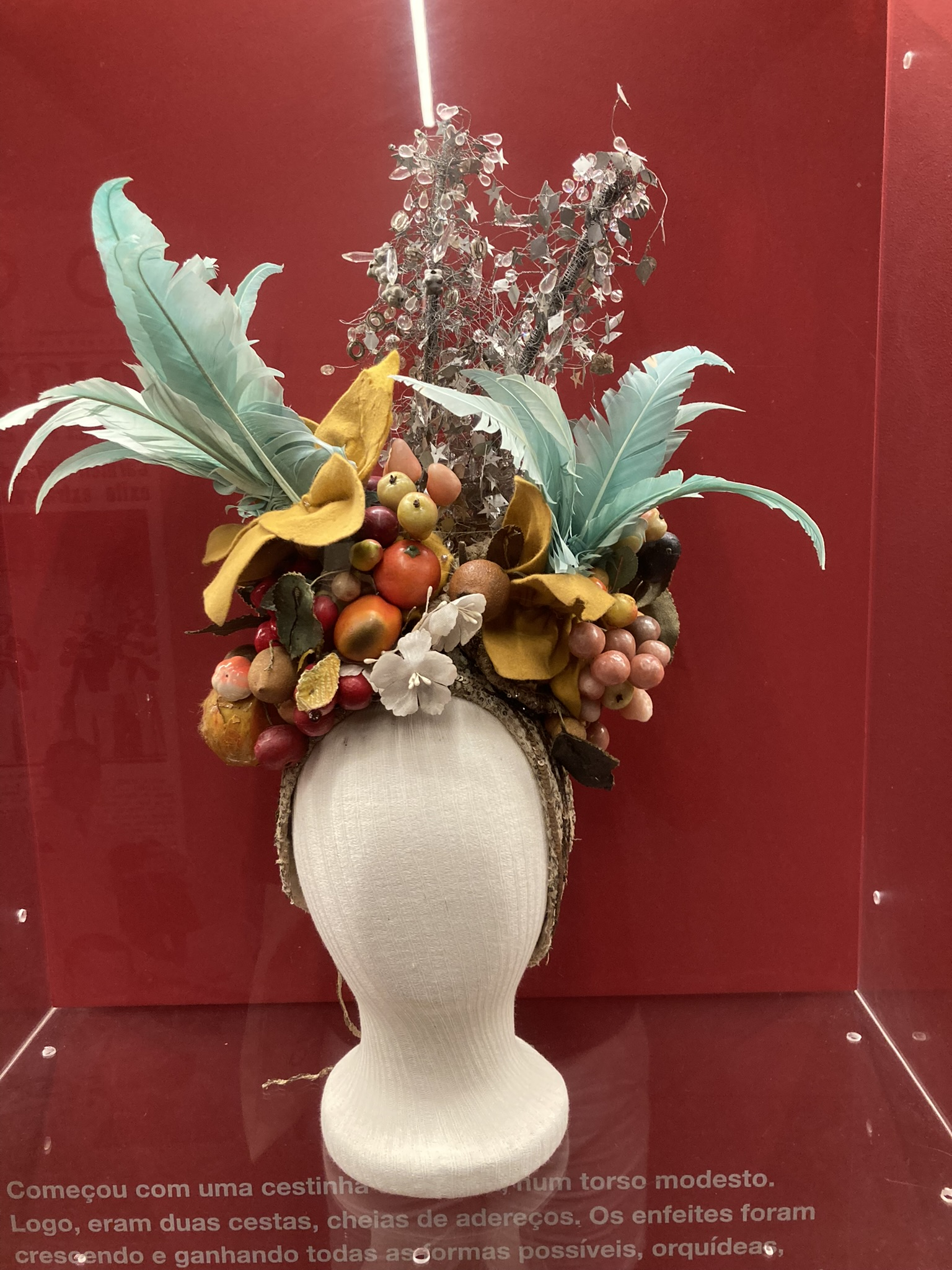
Carmen Miranda’s fruit turban used in the movie That Night in Rio.

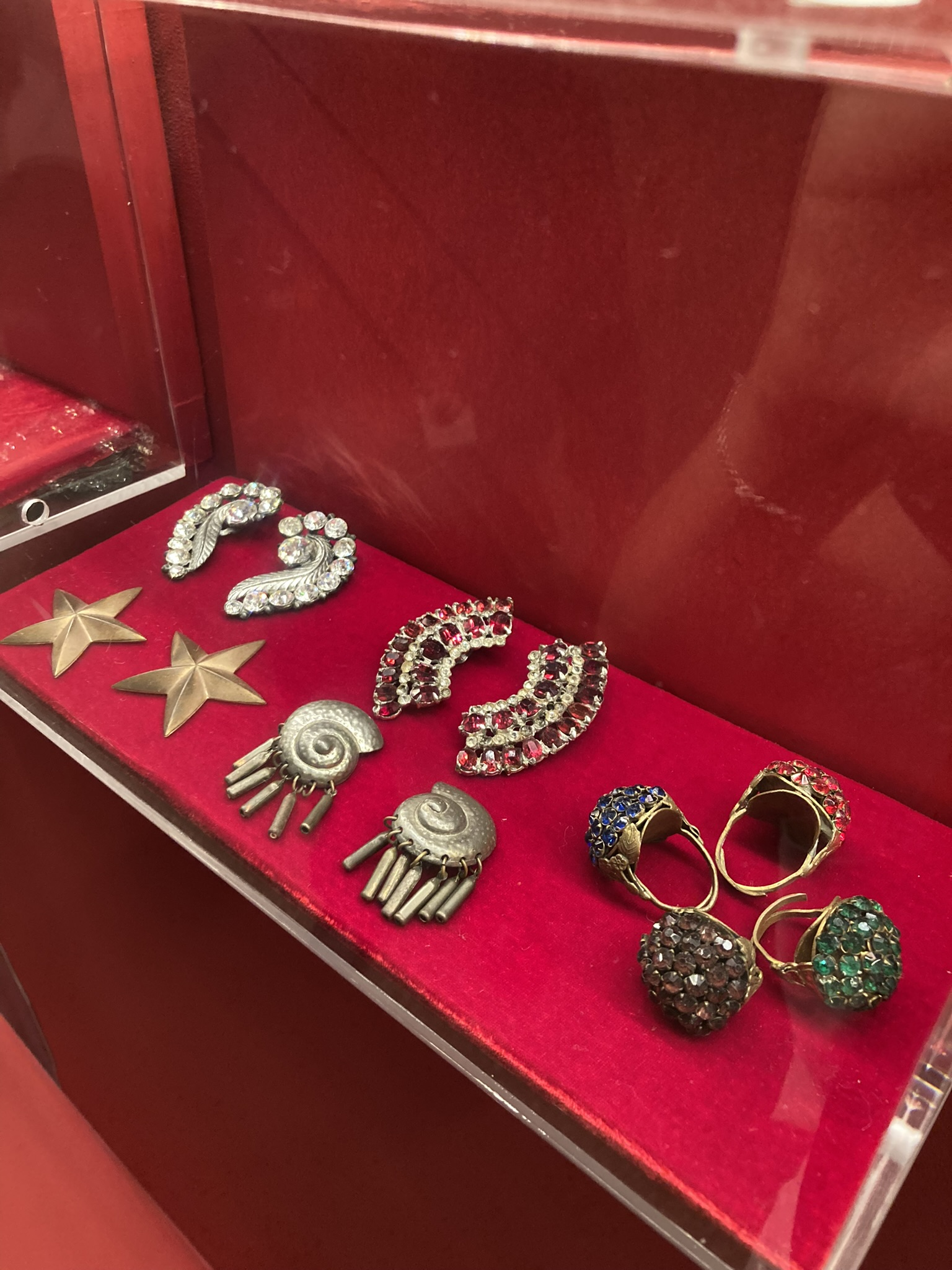
Carmen Miranda’s ring and earring collection.

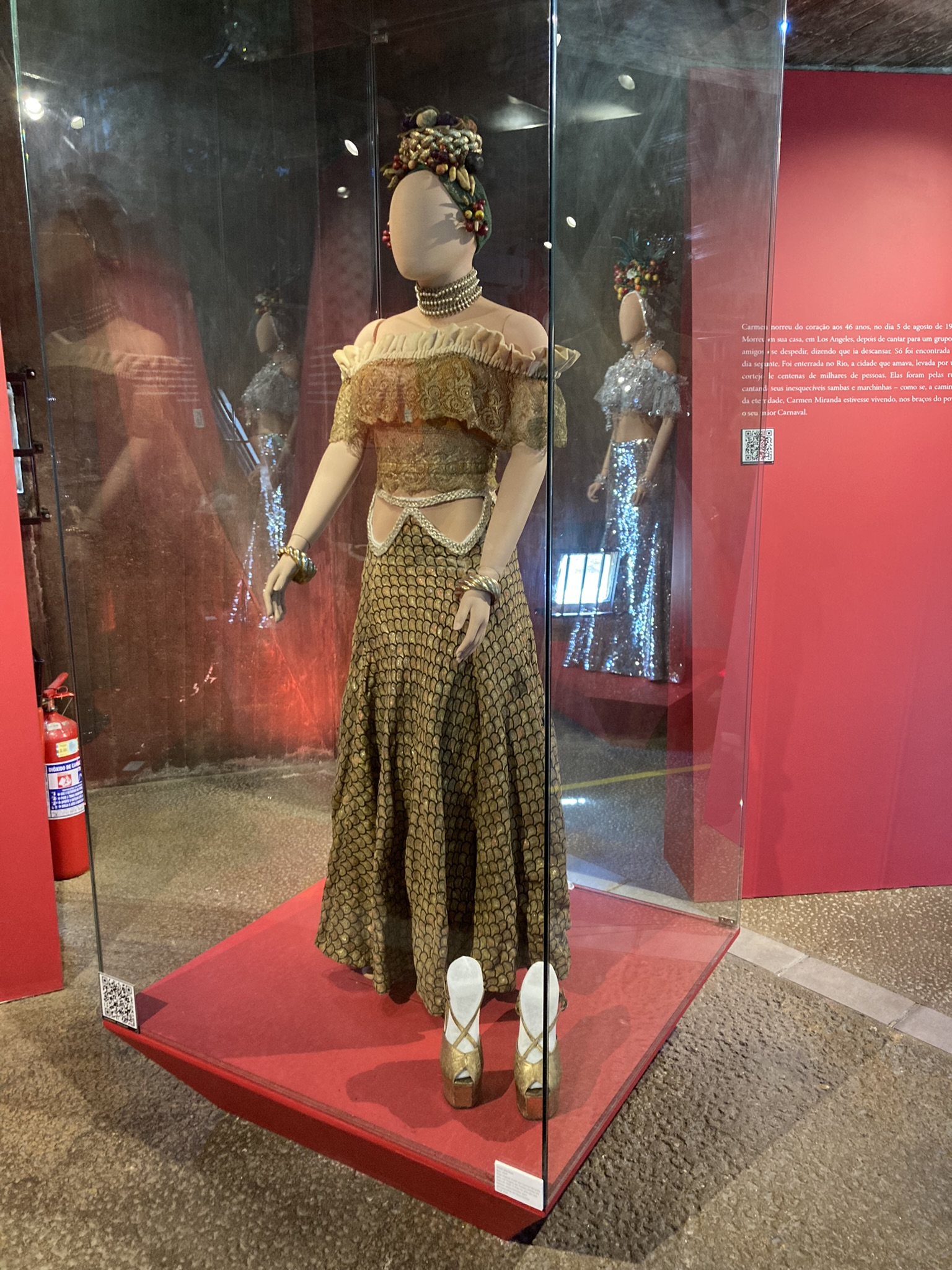
An original costume worn by Carmen Miranda.

== See also ==
- Museu da Imagem e do Som do Rio de Janeiro
- List of music museums
