= Museu da Imagem e do Som de Alagoas =

Museum in Brazil

Alagoas Museum of Image and Sound
- Museu da Imagem e Som de Alagoas
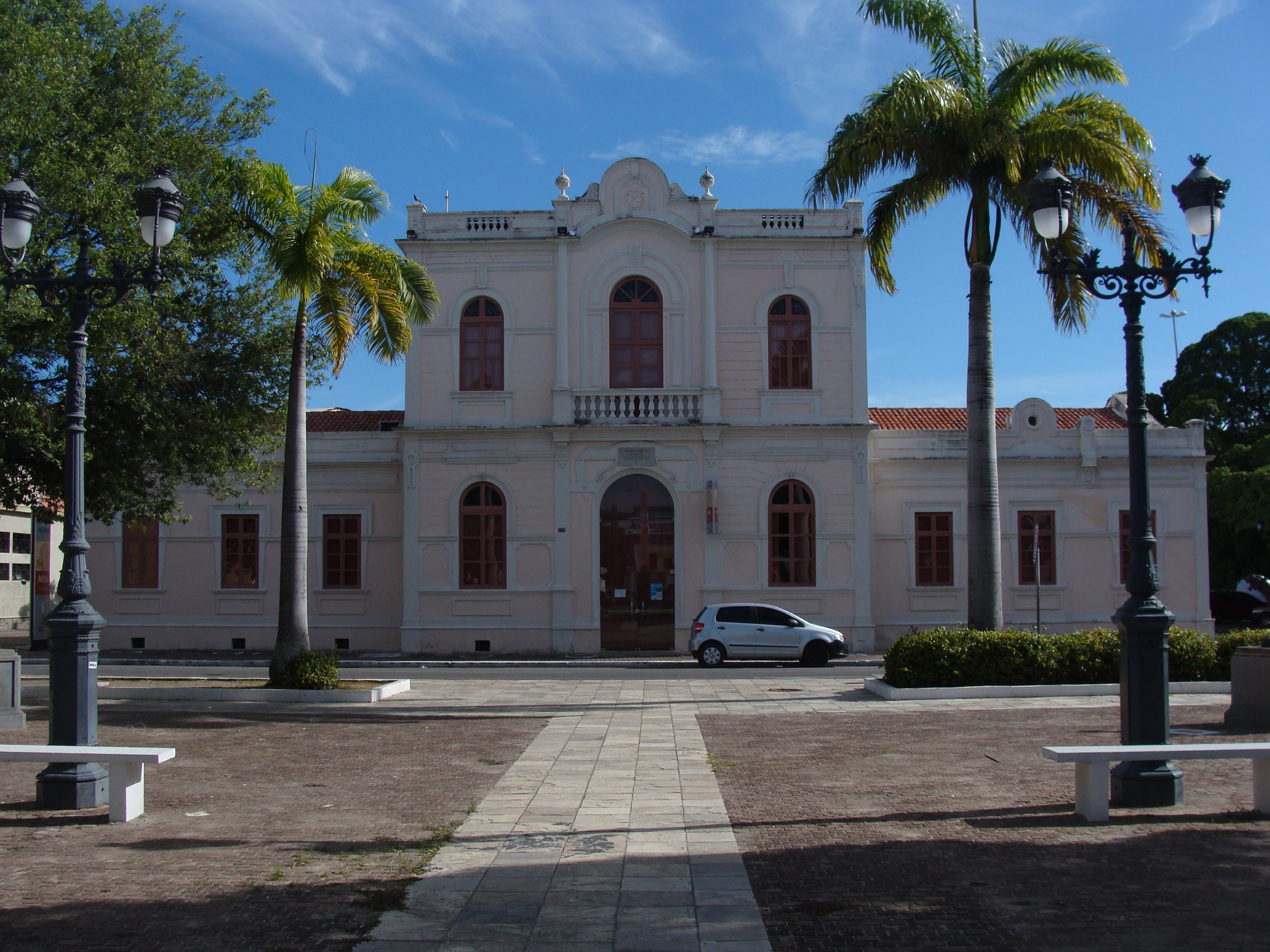
- Established: September 3, 1981; 44 years ago
- Location: Sá e Albuquerque street, 275
- Coordinates: 9.672669°S 35.722219°W
- Type: Heritage centre
- Website: MISA at cultura.al.gov

Museu da Imagem e Som de Alagoas (MISA — transl. Alagoas Museum of Image and Sound) is a Brazilian museum located in Maceió, on the state of Alagoas. It was opened on September 3, 1981, with the purpose of preserving the state's audiovisual heritage. Its curatorship is done by the State Secretariat for Culture (Brazilian portuguese: Secretaria de Estado da Cultura – Secult).

In 2016, the MISA became 35 years old. Besides the museum's own collection, expositions and shows by various artists have been hosted on the museum. In 2016, Secult started a project to increase the visibility of Alagoan musical culture: The Misa Acústico (Misa Acoustic).

From August to November 2016 and March - June 2017, eight musicians had shows in the MISA. Secult invested R$16 thousand in this project, with each artist receiving two thousand reais for contributing.

In 2001, the aging building where the museum is located, in the Praça Dois Leões, was restored. The building had been showing signs of weathering, being closed temporarily in 1997.

== Collection ==
MISA owns records of city events in pictures, compact cassette tapes and digital video, old records and a collection of donated objects such as radios and analogic cameras.

The collection includes records of all main political, social and artistic events from the state.

== See also ==
- List of music museums
