= Pete Seeger discography =

Cataloging of published recordings by Pete Seeger

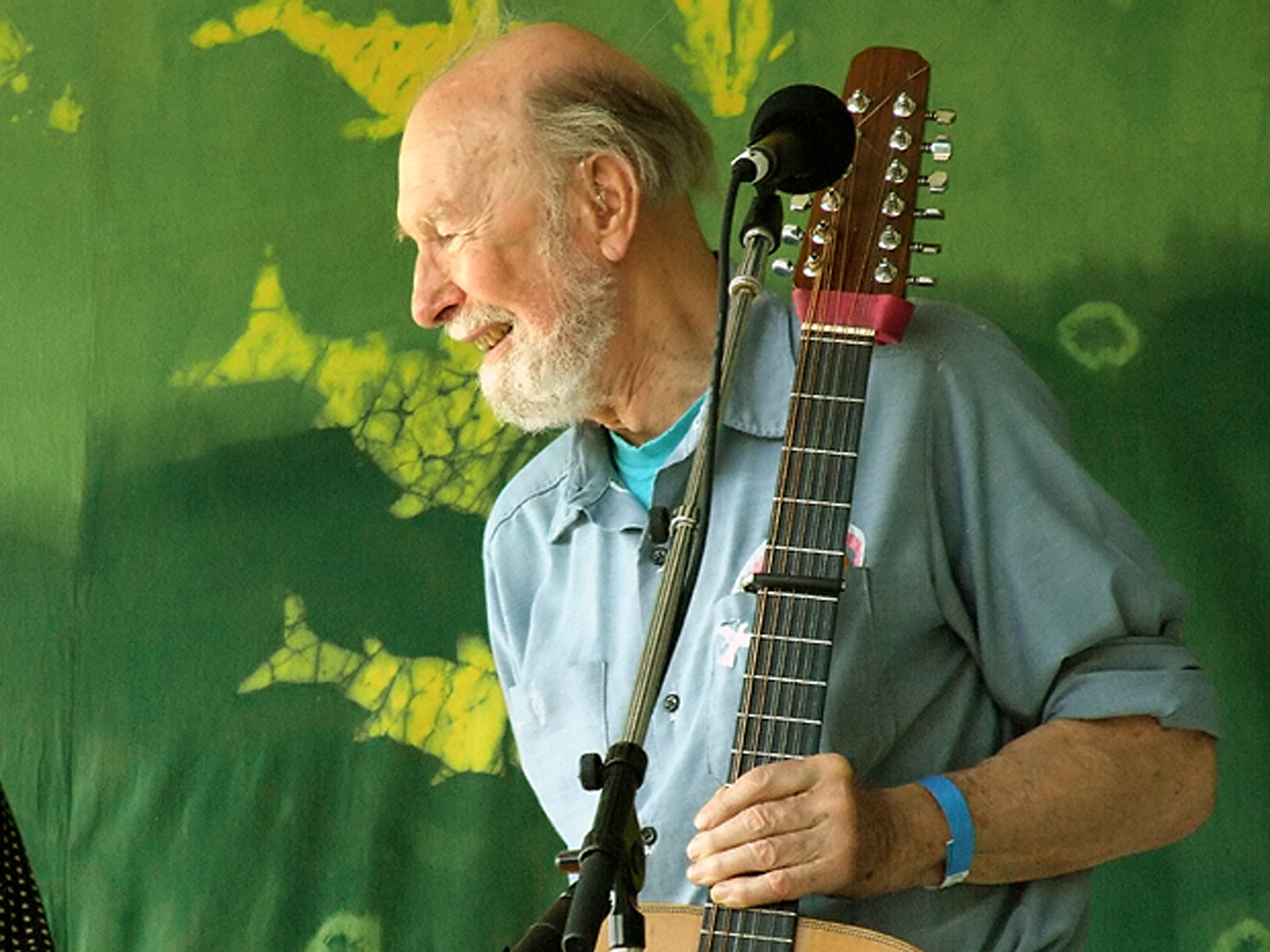
- Seeger at the Clearwater Festival, 2007.
- Studio albums: 52
- Live albums: 26
- Compilation albums: 24
- Singles: 31

The discography of Pete Seeger, an American folk singer, consists of 52 studio albums, 24 compilation albums, 26 live albums, 6 albums of other artists with him as a guest, and 31 singles. The artists who invited Seeger's musical career started in 1940 when he joined The Almanac Singers. He stayed with the group for two years until he was drafted into the Army to fight in the Second World War. After the end of World War II in 1945, Seeger helped found an organization known as People's Songs, along with the influential folk music magazine People's Songs Bulletin. He published several singles and a studio album with the magazine. Seeger would play at People's Songs events, called hootenannies, until the organization folded in 1949. After People's Songs, Seeger and another former member of the Almanacs, Lee Hays, founded the Weavers, who achieved commercial success. In 1952, The Weavers went on hiatus due to the Red Scare; Seeger and Hays both had Communist ties. After the demise of the Weavers, Seeger released a solo album, American Folk Songs for Children, in 1953 on Folkways Records. He continued to release albums on Folkways until he signed with Columbia in 1961.

== Albums ==
=== Studio albums ===
List of studio albums with re-releases and award nominations
Title	Release date	Label	Grammy Nominations	Ref(s)	Notes
American Banjo	1944	Asch			
Let's all Join In	1948	Young People's Records			
Sea Songs	1948	Young People's Records			
Darling Corey	1950	Folkways			
American Folk Songs for Children	1953	Folkways			
Frontier Ballads	1954	Folkways			
How to Play the 5-String Banjo	1954	Folkways			
Bantu Choral and Folk Songs	1955	Folkways			
Birds, Beasts, Bugs and Little Fishes	1955	Folkways			
Birds, Beasts, Bugs and Bigger Fishes	1955	Folkways			
Camp Songs	1955	Folkways			with Erik Darling
The Folksinger's Guitar Guide, Vol. 1: An Instruction Record	1955	Folkways			
Goofing-Off Suite	1955	Folkways			
Love Songs for Friends and Foes	1956	Folkways			
American Industrial Ballads	1956	Folkways			
American Ballads	1957	Folkways			
American Favorite Ballads, Vol. 1	December 1957	Folkways			
American Favorite Ballads, Vol. 2	1958	Folkways			
Gazette, Vol. 1	1958	Folkways			
Sleep-Time: Songs & Stories (Note: Re-titled Abiyoyo and Other Story Songs for Children for releases by Smithsonian Folkways.)	1958	Folkways			
American Favorite Ballads, Vol. 3	1959	Folkways			
American Play Parties	1959	Folkways			with Mika Seeger and Rev. Larry Eisenberg
Folk Songs for Young People	1959	Folkways	Grammy Award for Best Album for Children		
Nonesuch and Other Folk Tunes	1959	Folkways			with Frank Hamilton
Champlain Valley Songs	1960	Folkways			
Song and Play Time with Pete Seeger	1960	Folkways			
Songs of the Civil War	1960	Folkways			
Indian Summer	1960	Folkways			
Story Songs	April 1961	Columbia			
Songs of Memphis Slim and Willie Dixon	May 1961	Folkways			
American Favorite Ballads, Vol. 4	1961	Folkways			
Gazette, Vol. 2	1961	Folkways			
Songs of the Spanish Civil War, Vol. 1	1961	Folkways			
Activity Songs	1962	Folkways			
American Favorite Ballads, Vol. 5	1962	Folkways			
The 12-String Guitar as Played by Leadbelly	1962	Folkways			
Broadside Ballads, Vol. 2	1963	Folkways			
Broadsides: Songs and Ballads	1964	Folkways			
God Bless the Grass	January 17, 1966	Columbia	Grammy Award for Best Folk Recording		
Dangerous Songs!?	1966	Columbia			
Waist Deep in the Big Muddy and Other Love Songs	August 1967	Columbia	Grammy Award for Best Folk Performance		
Traditional Christmas Carols	1967	Folkways			
Pete Seeger Now	1968	Columbia			
Pete Seeger Young vs. Old	1969	Columbia			
Rainbow Race	1971	Columbia			
Banks of Marble and Other Songs	1974	Folkways			
Pete Seeger and Brother Kirk Visit Sesame Street	1974	Sesame Street			
Fifty Sail on Newburgh Bay	1976	Folkways			with Ed Renehan
Circles and Seasons	1979	Warner Bros.			
Carry It On	1986	Flying Fish			with Si Kahn and Jane Sapp
Pete	April 16, 1996	Living Music	Grammy Award for Best Traditional Folk Album (Note: Win)		
Seeds - The Songs Of Pete Seeger: Volume 3	September 23, 2003	Appleseed	Grammy Award for Best Traditional Folk Album		
At 89	September 30, 2008	Appleseed	Grammy Award for Best Traditional Folk Album		
Tomorrow's Children	July 27, 2010	Appleseed	Grammy Award for Best Musical Album for Children		
A More Perfect Union	September 25, 2012	Appleseed			
Pete Remembers Woody	September 25, 2012	Appleseed			

=== Live albums ===
List of live albums with re-releases and award nominations
Title	Release date	Label	Grammy Nominations	Ref(s)	Notes
A Pete Seeger Concert	1953	Stinson			
With Voices Together We Sing	1956	Folkways			
Pete Seeger and Sonny Terry	1957	Folkways			Pete and Sonny at Carnegie Hall
Hootenanny at Carnegie Hall	1960	Folkways			
Pete Seeger at the Village Gate with Memphis Slim and Willie Dixon	1960	Folkways			
Sing Out with Pete!	1961	Folkways			
Pete Seeger at the Village Gate, Vol. 2	1962	Folkways			
The Bitter and the Sweet: Recorded In Person At The Bitter End	1962	Columbia			
Children's Concert at Town Hall	1963	Columbia	Grammy Award for Best Recording for Children		
We Shall Overcome	1963	Columbia			
Sing Out! Hootenanny	1963	Folkways			
I Can See a New Day	1964	Columbia			
Sing with Seeger!	1964	Folkways			
Strangers and Cousins	1964	Columbia	Grammy Award for Best Recording for Children		
Pete Seeger on Campus	1965	Verve Folkways			
WNEW's Story of Selma	1965	Folkways			with Len Chandler and the Freedom Voices
Pete Seeger Sings and Answers Questions at Ford Forum Hall Boston	1968	Folkways			
Together in Concert	1975	Reprise			with Arlo Guthrie
Singalong Demonstration Concert	1980	Folkways			
Precious Friend	1982	Rising Son			with Arlo Guthrie
Pete Seeger's Family Concert	April 14, 1992	Sony Kids’ Music			
Live at Newport	June 1, 1993	Vanguard			
More Together Again	1994	Rising Son			with Arlo Guthrie
Live in Lisbon	June 28, 2000	Movieplay			
In Prague 1964	2001	Flyright			
Live in 65	November 10, 2009	Appleseed			
The Complete Bowdoin College Concert 1960	April 19, 2011	Smithsonian Folkways			

=== Compilation albums ===
List of compilation albums with re-releases and award nominations
Title	Release date	Label	Source albums	Ref(s)
Songs of Struggle & Protest: 1930-1950	1964	Folkways		
Pete Seeger Sings Woody Guthrie	1967	Folkways		
Pete Seeger's Greatest Hits	1967 (reissued 2002 with 4 extra songs)	Columbia, then Sony		
Pete Seeger Sings Leadbelly	1968	Folkways		
Wimoweh (And Other Songs of Freedom and Protest)	1968	Folkways		
The World of Pete Seeger	1974	Columbia		
The Essential Pete Seeger	1978	Vanguard		
How I Hunted The Little Fellows	1980	Folkways	How I Hunted The Little Fellows by Boris Zhitkov, Pete Seeger Sings In Concert At Town Hall	
We Shall Overcome: The Complete Carnegie Hall Concert	1989	Columbia	We Shall Overcome	
A Fish That's a Song	1990	Smithsonian Folkways	album with various artists	
Folk Music of the World	1991	Legacy		
Clearwater Classics	1993	Sony		
A Link in the Chain	September 3, 1996	Legacy		
Best of Pete Seeger	September 30, 1997	Vanguard		
Birds, Beasts, Bugs & Fishes (Little & Big)	February 17, 1998	Folkways	Birds, Beasts, Bugs and Little Fishes and Birds, Beasts, Bugs and Bigger Fishes	
For Kids and Just Plain Folks	March 24, 1998	Sony		
If I Had a Hammer: Songs of Hope & Struggle	May 19, 1998	Folkways		
The Original Folkways Recordings	February 23, 1999	Legacy		
Headlines and Footnotes: Collection of Topical Songs	May 18, 1999	Folkways		
Pioneer of Folk	August 1, 1999	Prism		
American Folk, Game and Activity Songs for Children	January 25, 2000	Folkways	American Folk Songs for Children and American Game and Activity Songs for Children	
Dear Jean: Artists Celebrate Jean Ritchie	2014	Compass	album with various artists	

== Singles ==
List of singles, with selected chart positions, showing year released and album name
Year	Title	Peak chart positions	Album	Ref.
Year	Title	US	Album	Ref.
1941	"Song for Harry Bridges"	—		
1942	"Keep That Oil A-Rollin'"	—		
1947	"Travelin' Death of Harry Sims"	—		
1947	"Zhankoye"	—		
1948	"Black, Brown, and White Blues"	—		
1948	"Cumberland Mountain Bear Chase"	—		
1948	"Johnny I Hardly Knew Ye"	—		
1950	"Tzen, Tzen"	—		
1950	"Wreck of the John B"	—		
1950	"Lonesome Traveller"	—		
1951	"Across the Wide Missouri"	—		
1951	"The Frozen Logger"	—	Darling Correy	
1951	"Along the Colorado Trail"	—		
1951	"When the Saints Come Marching In"	—		
1951	"Jig Along Home"	—		
1951	"Join into the Game"	—		
1951	"Twelve Days of Christmas"	—		
1951	"Joy to the World"	—		
1951	"I Ride an Old Paint"	—		
1952	"The Gandy Dancer's Ball"	—		
1952	"Hard, Ain't It Hard"	—		
1952	"Bay of Mexico"	—		
1953	"Rock Island Line"	—		
1958	"Done Laid Around"	—		
1959	"The Battle of New Orleans"	—	Nonesuch and Other Folk Tunes	
1959	"Skip to My Lou"	—		
1963	"Little Boxes"	75	Broadside Ballads, Vol. 2	
1965	"Healing River"	—		
1965	"Draft Dodger Rag"	—	Dangerous Songs!?	
1967	"Waist Deep in the Big Muddy"	—	Waist Deep in the Big Muddy and Other Love Songs	
1970	"I Feel like I'm Fixin' to Die Rag"	—	Pete Seeger Young vs. Old	
2012	"God's Counting on Me, God's Counting on You (Sloop Mix)"	—		

"—" denotes a recording that did not chart or was not released in that territory.

== Other appearances ==
List of other artists
Title	Release date	Label	Source albums	How many tracks
Old Time Fiddle Tunes Played By Jean Carignan	1960	Folkways	Jean Carignan on fiddle	8
The Second Annual Farewell Reunion	1973	Mercury	Mike Seeger	1
Third Annual Farewell Reunion	1994	Rounder	Mike Seeger	1
Glory Shone Around: A Christmas Collection	1995	Rounder	Tony Trischka	2
Call Down the Thunder	1996	Red House	Guy Davis	1
My Name Is Buddy	2007	Nonesuch	Ry Cooder	1
Territory	2008	Smithsonian Folkways	Tony Trischka	1
