= We Shall Overcome (Pete Seeger album) =

Live album by Pete Seeger
- Released: 1963
- Recorded: June 8, 1963
- Venue: Carnegie Hall, New York City
- Genre: Folk
- Length: 36:58
- Label: Columbia
- Producer: Harold Leventhal

Pete Seeger chronology
American Folk Songs for Children (1953)	We Shall Overcome (1963)	God Bless the Grass (1966)

Professional ratings
Review scores
Source	Rating
AllMusic	4/5 stars

We Shall Overcome is a 1963 album by Pete Seeger. It was recorded live at his concert at Carnegie Hall, New York City, on June 8, 1963, and was released by Columbia Records.

The concert would later be described by Ed Vulliamy of The Observer as "a launch event for the entwining of the music and politics of the 1960s". Reviewer Stewart Mason at Allmusic said some of the songs were "trite", and that "the second half of the concert, climaxing in the definitive version of 'Guantanamera,' is protest folk at its finest." It was added to the National Recording Registry by the Library of Congress in 2006, which called it "culturally, historically, or aesthetically significant."

The album was reissued in an expanded 2-CD version in 1989, as We Shall Overcome - The Complete Carnegie Hall Concert.

== Track listing ==
=== Original LP ===
Side 1:

1. "If You Miss Me at the Back of the Bus" (Traditional) 2:09
2. "Keep Your Eyes on the Prize" (Traditional, Alice Wine) 2:00
3. "I Ain't Scared of Your Jail" (Pete Seeger) 1:33
4. "Oh Freedom" (Traditional) 3:12
5. "What Did You Learn in School Today" (Tom Paxton) 1:40
6. "Little Boxes" (Malvina Reynolds) 1:52
7. "Who Killed Norma Jean?" (Pete Seeger) 2:21
8. "Who Killed Davey Moore?" (Bob Dylan) 2:20

Side 2:

1. "A Hard Rain's A-Gonna Fall" (Bob Dylan) 5:35
2. "Mail Myself to You" (Woody Guthrie) 1:11
3. "Guantanamera" (Héctor Angulo, Joseíto Fernandez, José Martí, Julián Orbón, Pete Seeger) 4:37
4. "Tshotsholosa" (Todd Matshikiza / Pat Williams) 1:27
5. "We Shall Overcome" (Guy Carawan, Frank Hamilton, Zilphia Horton, Pete Seeger) 5:58

=== Expanded CD ===
Disc 1:

1. "Audience" 1:07
2. Banjo Medley: "Cripple Creek/Old Joe Clark/Leather Britches" (Traditional) 2:20
3. "Lady Margaret" (Traditional) 3:30
4. "Mrs. McGrath" (Traditional) 4:01
5. "Mail Myself to You" (Woody Guthrie) 1:36
6. "My Rambling Boy" (Tom Paxton) 5:20
7. "A Little Brand New Baby" (Tom Paxton) 1:21
8. "What Did You Learn In School Today?" (Tom Paxton) 2:04
9. "Little Boxes" (Malvina Reynolds) 3:02
10. "Mrs. Clara Sullivan's Letter" (Malvina Reynolds, Pete Seeger) 3:31
11. "Who Killed Norma Jean?" (Pete Seeger) 2:51
12. "Who Killed Davey Moore?" (Bob Dylan) 3:11
13. "Farewell (Fare Thee Well)" (Bob Dylan) 3:10
14. "A Hard Rain's A-Gonna Fall" (Bob Dylan) 6:07
15. "Didn't He Ramble" (Traditional) 1:22
16. "Keep Your Eyes On The Prize" (Traditional) 3:26
17. "If You Miss Me at the Back of the Bus" (Pete Seeger) 2:41
18. "I Ain't Scared of Your Jail" (Pete Seeger) 1:55
19. "Oh, Freedom" (Traditional) 5:25

Disc 2:

1. "Audience" 0:58
2. "Skip to My Lou" (Traditional) 2:06
3. "Sweet Potatoes" (Traditional) 2:51
4. "Deep Blue Sea" (Traditional) 2:32
5. "Sea of Misery" (Traditional) 0:59
6. "Oh Louisiana" (Steve Howell) 2:19
7. "Johnny Give Me" (Steve Howell) 2:27
8. "Oh, What a Beautiful City!" (Marion Hicks) 3:01
9. "Lua de Sertao (Moon of the Backland)" (Traditional) 2:47
10. "Misirlou" (Traditional) 2:12
11. "Polyushke Polye (Meadowlands)" (Traditional) 1:25
12. "Genbaku O Yurusumagi (Never Again The A Bomb)" (Pete Seeger) 2:44
13. "Schtille Di Nacht (Quiet is the Night)" (Pete Seeger) 3:47
14. "Viva la Quince Brigada (Long Live The Fifteenth Brigade)" (Pete Seeger) 3:55
15. "Tshotsholosa (Road Song)" (Todd Matshikiza, P. Williams) 2:43
16. "This Land Is Your Land" (Woody Guthrie) 3:31
17. "From Way Up Here" (Malvina Reynolds, Pete Seeger) 2:37
18. "We Shall Overcome" (Guy Carawan, Frank Hamilton, Zilphia Horton, Pete Seeger) 8:14
19. "Mister Tom Hughes' Town" (Lead Belly) 1:42
20. "Bring Me Li'l Water, Silvy" (Lead Belly) 3:48
21. "Guantanamera" (Héctor Angulo, Joseíto Fernandez, José Martí, Julián Orbón, Pete Seeger) 7:07
