= If You Miss Me at the Back of the Bus =

Single by Pete Seeger

from the album We Shall Overcome
- Released: 1963
- Label: Columbia
- Songwriter: Charles Neblett

"If You Miss Me at The Back of the Bus" is a song written by Charles Neblett and recorded by Pete Seeger on his album We Shall Overcome in 1963. The song was written in response to attempts to desegregate a public swimming pool in Cairo, Illinois, after a young African-American man drowned while swimming in a local river due to the pool not allowing any African-Americans to use it. The song depicts the attitude of the African-American community towards the Civil Rights Movement during the 1960s. In his book with Bob Reiser, Everybody Says Freedom, Seeger commented that people would improvise new lyrics to the song to reflect on various situations. The song's popularity grew after it began to be used as one of the anthems for the civil rights movement.

== See also ==
- Civil rights movement in popular culture
