= If I Had a Hammer (disambiguation) =

"If I Had a Hammer" is a song written by Pete Seeger and Lee Hays, later recorded by Peter, Paul, and Mary, Trini Lopez, and Leonard Nimoy.

If I Had a Hammer may also refer to:

- "If I Had a Hammer", a different song by American Music Club from their 1994 album Mercury
- "If I Had a Hammer" (Hercules: The Legendary Journeys), a 1998 episode of Hercules: The Legendary Journeys
- If I Had a Hammer (film), a film by independent filmmaker Josh Becker
- "If I Had a Hammer" (CSI), an episode of the TV series CSI: Crime Scene Investigation
- If I Had a Hammer (Dexter), an episode of the TV series Dexter
- If I Had a Hammer: Songs of Hope & Struggle, a 1998 compilation album by Pete Seeger

== See also ==
- "Man-with-a-hammer syndrome", the cognitive bias otherwise known as law of the instrument
