= David King Dunaway =

American historian

- Education: University of California, Berkeley
- Occupations: University professor, Author
- Writing career
- Years active: since 1981
- Genres: Biography; Social history
- Subjects: American folk music; Pete Seeger; Aldous Huxley; Route 66
- Website: www.davidkdunaway.com

David King Dunaway is an American historian. He is a professor of English at the University of New Mexico in Albuquerque, New Mexico; he was previously on the faculty of San Francisco State University in San Francisco. He was also the first consultant to the UNESCO Program on Intangible Cultural Heritage.

== Books ==
David Dunaway's first book, How Can I Keep From Singing, the biography of folk musician and social activist Pete Seeger, was based on his doctoral dissertation at the University of California, Berkeley, and first released in 1981. Since then, it has been translated into Japanese and Spanish and been through six editions. Working with Seeger, Dunaway completed a revised, updated version of the biography in 2008 from Villard Books/Ballantine.

Dunaway is also the editor of Oral History: An Interdisciplinary Anthology (with Willa Baum; second edition, Rowman & Littlefield, 1996), and the author of Huxley in Hollywood (Harper Collins, 1990), Writing the Southwest (with Sarah Spurgeon; revised edition, University of New Mexico Press, 2003), Aldous Huxley Recollected (AltaMira/Rowman & Littlefield, 1998), Across the Tracks: A Route 66 Story (in press), Oral History on Route 66: A Manual (National Park Service, 2005), Singing Out: An Oral History of America's Folk Music Revivals (with Molly Beer; Oxford, 2010), A Pete Seeger Discography (Scarecrow Press/Rowman, 2011), and A Route 66 Companion (University of Texas Press, 2012), and Researching Route 66: A Bibliographical Guide (with Stephen Mandrgoc) (National Park Service, 2023). His most recent work is A Four- Eyed World: How Glasses Changed The Way We See (Bloomsburg, 2026).

== Radio series ==
Dunaway has been active in radio since 1972, when he produced "Midnight Country" for KPFA-FM in Berkeley. Four of his radio documentary series were developed in conjunction with his writing – "Writing the Southwest" (1995) developed with funding from the NEH and the Humanities Endowments in Arizona, Colorado, and New Mexico; "Aldous Huxley's Brave New Worlds" (1998) funded by the California and New Mexico Endowments for the Humanities and Public Radio International; and "Across the Tracks: A Route 66 Story" (2001) which received awards from the International Radio Festival, the Associated Press, and a Silver Reel. In 2008-9, his documentary on Pete Seeger aired on more than 300 stations and won Best of Show: Audio from the Broadcast Education Association. He is a DJ for KUNM-FM in Albuquerque, NM.

In 2008, Dunaway's biography of Pete Seeger (originally published in 1981) was re-released along with a three part audio/radio series covering Seeger's life and music. According to reviewer Michael Huntsberger, the series also included "recordings of Charles Seeger (Pete's father), Leadbelly, and Woody Guthrie, and interviews with Pete Seeger's contemporaries," including a selection of Seeger's music.

== Magazine and journal articles ==
Dunaway has written for popular media, with articles on music, social activism, and oral history appearing in venues from Mother Jones to the New York Times. In 2004, his writing on the Danish government's efforts to derail the world's oldest experiment in anarchy, Christiania, was carried by the San Francisco Chronicle and National Public Radio's Morning Edition.

Dunaway also contributes to academic audiences, contributing his articles to scholarly journals such as the Oral History Review, The Public Historian, the Journal of American Folklore, Southwestern American Literature, and New Media and Society, and Biography.

== Bibliography ==
- Dunaway, David King; Willa K. Baum, (1984, 1996). Oral History: An Interdisciplinary Anthology. Rowman & Little Field Pub. ISBN 978-0-7619-9189-2.
- Dunaway, David King (1991). Huxley in Hollywood. Anchor Books. ISBN 9780385415910. OCLC 22278860.
- Dunaway, David King (1999). Aldous Huxley Recollected: An Oral History. AltaMira. ISBN 9780761990642. OCLC 924860333.
- Dunaway, David King; Spurgeon, Sara L (2003). Writing the Southwest. University of New Mexico Press. ISBN 9780826323361. OCLC 1049025646.
- Dunaway, David King (2008) [1981]. How Can I Keep From Singing?: The Ballad of Pete Seeger. Villard. ISBN 9780345506085. OCLC 174501218.
- A Pete Seeger Discography. Rowman & Littlefield Pub. Group. 2010. ISBN 9781282922396.
- Dunaway, David King; Waldmire, Robert (2012). A Route 66 Companion. University of Texas Press. ISBN 9780292726604. OCLC 1053927392.
- Dunaway, David King; Beer, Molly (2012). Singing Out: An Oral History of America's Folk Music Revivals. Oxford University Press. ISBN 9780199896561. OCLC 756279284.
- Dunaway, David King; Stephen Mandrgoc (2023). Researching Route 66. National Park Service.
- Dunaway, David King (2026) A Four-Eyed World: How Glasses Changed The Way We See. Bloomsbury. ISBN 979-8-8818-0482-4.
