= Birds, Beasts, Bugs & Fishes (Little & Big) =

Album by Pete Seeger

Compilation album by Pete Seeger
- Released: February 17, 1998
- Genre: Folk; country
- Length: 1:05:44
- Label: Smithsonian Folkways
- Producer: Moses Asch

Alternative Cover
- Album covers from the 1955 releases.

Professional ratings
Review scores
Source	Rating
AllMusic	4.5/5 stars

Birds, Beasts, Bugs & Fishes (Little & Big) is a 1998 compilation album by Pete Seeger and was released on Smithsonian Folkways as SFW45039.

This collection is a compilation of 28 songs and stories about animals that Pete Seeger released in 1955 on two short Folkways Records LPs: Birds, Beasts, Bugs and Little Fishes (Folkways FC 7610) and Birds, Beasts, Bugs & Bigger Fishes (Folkways FC 7611).

== Track listing ==
No.	Title	Length
1.	"Fly Through My Window"	2:28
2.	"I Had A Rooster"	3:51
3.	"Come All You Bold Sailormen"	3:17
4.	"Old Grey Mule"	1:57
5.	"Alligator, Hedgehog"	0:41
6.	"Frog Went A-Courting"	1:16
7.	"Raccoon's Got A Bushy Tail"	1:16
8.	"I Know An Old Lady (Who Swallowed A Fly)"	2:55
9.	"Ground Hog"	2:09
10.	"Mister Rabbit"	2:03
11.	"Grey Goose"	2:19
12.	"Teency Weency Spider"	0:23
13.	"The Old Hen"	2:27
14.	"Skip To My Lou"	1:30
15.	"My Little Kitty"	1:23
16.	"The Little Black Bull"	2:04
17.	"Leatherwing Bat"	2:17
18.	"The Keeper And The Doe"	2:06
19.	"The Darby Ram"	2:21
20.	"Mole In The Ground"	1:12
21.	"The Fox"	1:44
22.	"Turtle Dove"	1:51
23.	"Old Paint"	2:09
24.	"The Elephant"	0:31
25.	"The Foolish Frog"	7:07
26.	"Little Dogies"	4:15
27.	"Bear Hunt"	3:34
28.	"Old Blue"	2:18
Total length:		1:05:44

Notes

- Tracks 1–15 are Birds, Beasts, Bugs and Little Fishes
- Tracks 16–28 are Birds, Beasts, Bugs & Bigger Fishes

== Personnel ==
- Production coordinator – Mary Monseur, Michael Maloney
- Mastered – Charlie Pilzer
- Editorial assistance – Carla Borden, Peter Seitel
- Producer – Moses Asch
- Remastered – Joe Brescio
- Audio supervised – Pete Reiniger
- Production supervised – Amy Horowitz and Anthony Seeger
