= Edward J. Renehan Jr. =

American writer, consultant, and publisher

Ed Renehan
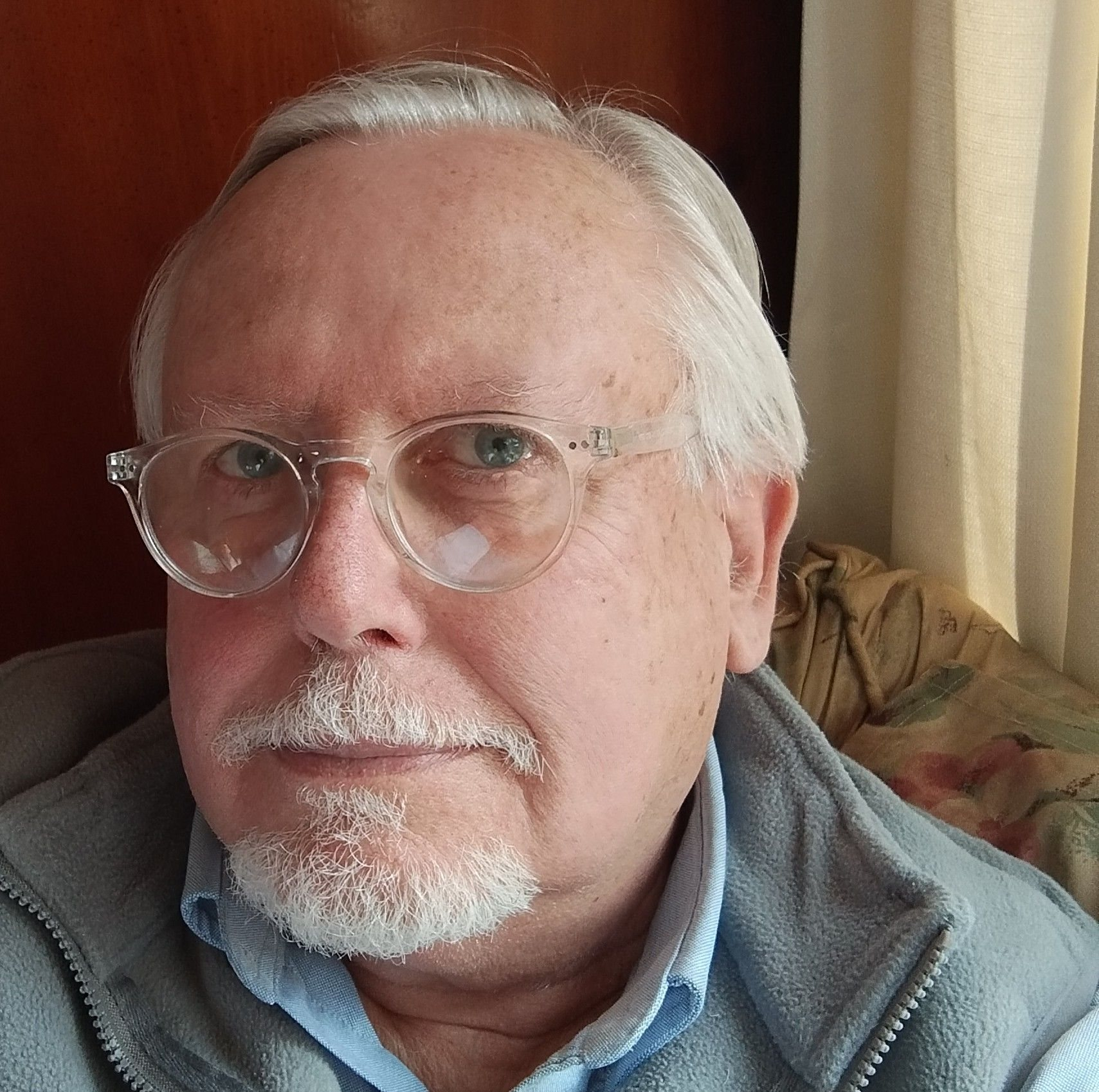
- Edward Renehan photographed in 2024

Background information
- Born: Edward John Renehan Jr. August 7, 1956 (age 70)
- Genre: folk
- Occupations: American writer, consultant, publisher, musician
- Instruments: vocals, guitar

Edward John Renehan Jr. (born c. August 7, 1956) is an American author, ghost-writer, consultant, publisher, and Grammy Award-winning musician.

== Early life and music ==
Renehan grew up in the Long Island village of Valley Stream, New York, where he attended school with future actor/director Steve Buscemi and actress Patricia Charbonneau.

He studied blues guitar with the Reverend Gary Davis in New York as a teenager. By 20, he was playing and recording with folksingers Pete Seeger and Don McLean, among others. In 1976, he and Seeger recorded "Fifty Sail on Newburgh Bay: Hudson Valley Songs Old & New Sung by Pete Seeger and Ed Renehan." Several of the tracks Renehan recorded with Seeger reappeared in 2019 as part of the six-CD, table-top book retrospective "Pete Seeger: The Smithsonian Folkways Collection" which won the Grammy Award for Best Historical Album.

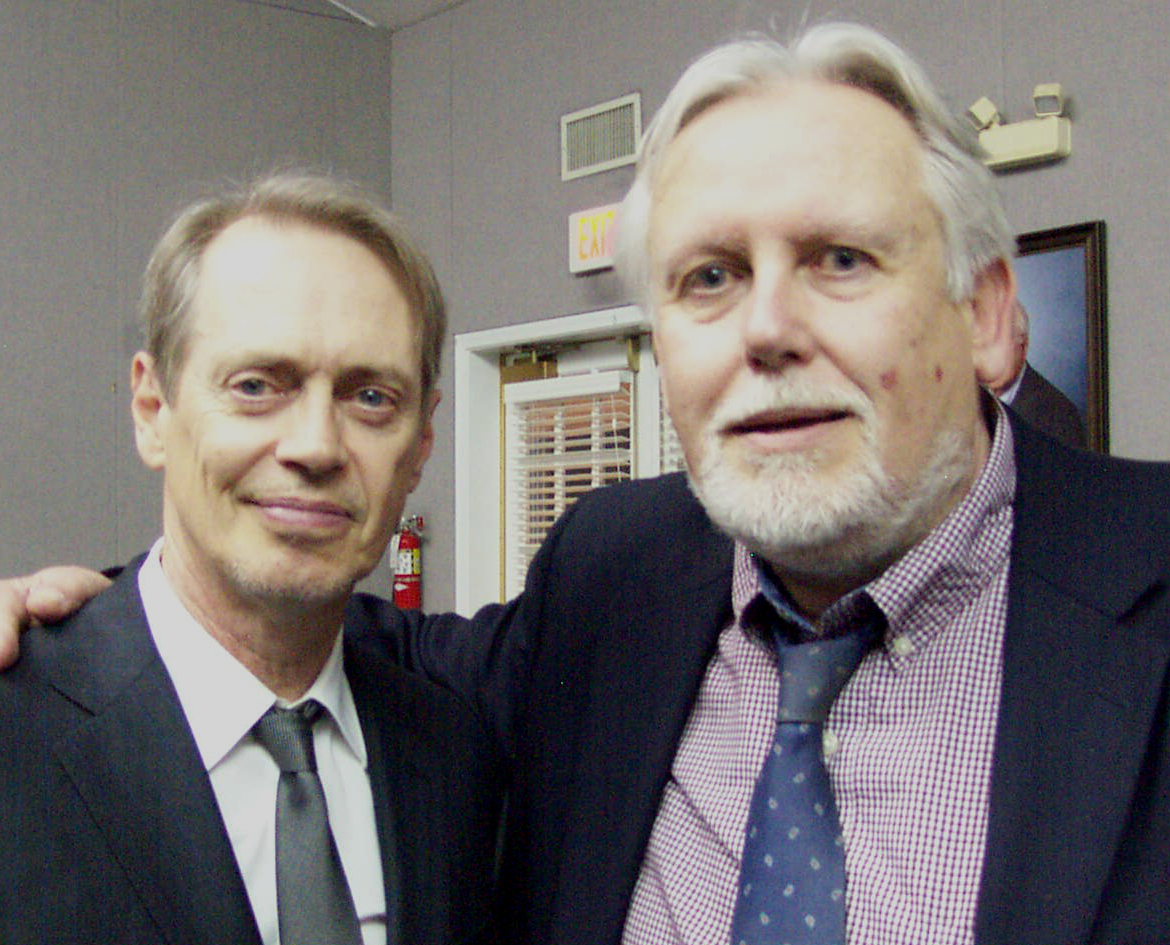
Friends Edward Renehan and Steve Buscemi photographed in the Spring of 2015.

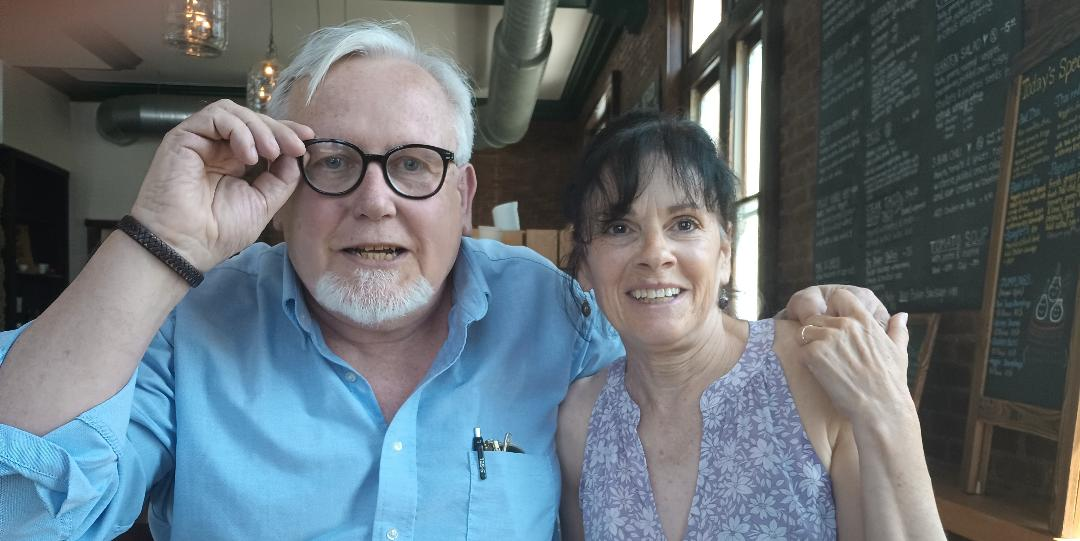
From left: Ed Renehan with actress Patricia Charbonneau, 2023.

In his early twenties he performed with Happy Traum, Artie Traum and others at various venues and folk festivals in the North East. Renehan stopped playing professionally in 1980, and only rarely ventured onto stages thereafter.

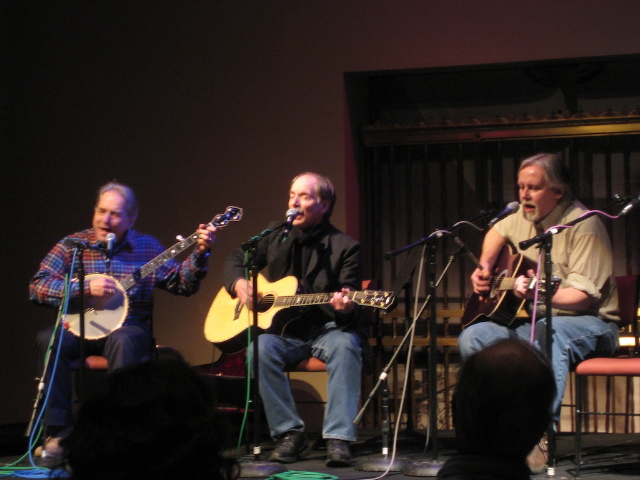
From left: Happy Traum, Artie Traum, and Ed Renehan performing at a reunion concert, Albany, 2008

== Publishing and consulting ==
Renehan graduated from State University of New York at New Paltz. He thereafter worked for several New York publishing companies, focusing on the developing domain of digital publishing, including e-publishing and print-on-demand (POD) technologies. His tenure included 7 years as Director of Computer Publishing Programs for MBCI/Macmillan, now a part of Bookspan.

From 1994, he worked as an independent consultant and author, including writing books on the Kennedys, Jay Gould and John Burroughs, as well as best-selling books about computers and computing. During this period he wrote books published by Doubleday, Crown, Oxford University Press, Basic Books, McGraw Hill, Simon & Schuster, Chelsea House, and other firms.

In 2010, Renehan founded New Street Communications, an enterprise focused on audio, digital, and POD editions of books in a range of fields. According to a July 2013 report in the Providence Business News, the combined New Street firms had revenues of more than $200,000 in the 2012 fiscal year, which was the enterprise's second full year of operation. As of June 2015, the firm had 85 titles in print.

In 2022, he founded the New Street division illume Media, a boutique a la cart publishing agency offering ghostwriting, writing, editing, book-doctoring, design, audiobook creation, eBook creation, and hybrid- and self-publishing guidance to clients interested in any or all of these services. The firm's focus is on nonfiction with specialties in finance, investing, management, and related fields.

== Family and affiliations ==
Renehan is married and lives in the village of Wickford, Rhode Island. He has two adult children, and is a grandfather. He has served on several nonprofit boards, including the Hudson River Sloop Clearwater. He is active in the Electronic Frontier Foundation — the co-founder of which, John Perry Barlow, sat on the New Street Editorial Board until his death in 2018. With Stewart Brand and others, he is a founding member of The Long Now Foundation.

== Works (partial list) ==
- Deliberate Evil: Nathaniel Hawthorne, Daniel Webster, and the 1830 Murder of a Salem Slave Trader (ISBN 978-1-64160-338-6)
- The Life of Charles Stewart Mott: Industrialist, Philanthropist, Mr. Flint (ISBN 9780472131723)
- The Enkert Dossiers (ISBN 978-0692469019)
- Desperate Voyage: Donald Crowhurst, The London Sunday Times Golden Globe Race, and the Tragedy of Teignmouth Electron (ISBN 978-0692757611)
- Dylan at Newport, 1965: Music, Myth, and Un-Meaning (ISBN 978-0692464601)
- Pete Seeger vs. The Un-Americans: A Tale of the Blacklist (ISBN 978-0615998138)
- Understanding Kerouac's ON THE ROAD (ISBN 978-0615714677)
- Dark Genius of Wall Street: The Misunderstood Life of Jay Gould, King of the Robber Barons (ISBN 978-0465068869)
- The Kennedys at War (ISBN 978-0385501651)
- The Secret Six: The True Tale of the Men Who Conspired with John Brown (ISBN 978-1570031816)
- John Burroughs: An American Naturalist (ISBN 978-1883789169)
- Commodore: The Life of Cornelius Vanderbilt (ISBN 978-0465002559)
- The Lion's Pride: Theodore Roosevelt and his Family in Peace and War (ISBN 978-0195127195)
