= Sleep-Time: Songs & Stories =

Studio album by Pete Seeger
- Released: 1958
- Genre: Folk
- Length: 41:19
- Label: Folkways Records

Pete Seeger chronology
Gazette, Vol. 1 (1958)	Sleep-Time: Songs & Stories (1958)	American Favorite Ballads, Vol. 3 (1959)

Alternative Cover

Sleep-Time: Songs & Stories is a studio album by American folk singer Pete Seeger. It was released in 1958 by Folkways Records. It was later re-released in 1967 under the name Abiyoyo and Other Story Songs for Children by Smithsonian Folkways.

== Album ==
On this children's album, Pete Seeger devotes himself to putting small children to sleep, first by telling them stories, then by singing to them. The LP's first side contains two stories with music. Side two features child-oriented songs, concluding with the a cappella song "One Grain of Sand." The album was recorded by Moses Asch. The illustration for the original release was done by David Stone Martin and the design for the reissue was by Craig Mierop.

== Critical reception ==
Professional ratings
Review scores
Source	Rating
AllMusic	5/5 stars

Allmusic awarded the album five out five stars and said "The songs, from the ballad-like story song "Sam the Whaler" to the downright silly "Where Are My Pajamas?," are played with easy grace and humor by Seeger, who treats each song exactly as he would a song that was putatively for adults. Never condescending to his audience or affecting a cutesy demeanor, Seeger pulls off the effective trick of treating kids not as kids, but as human beings. The result is that Abiyoyo is one of those extremely rare children's albums that's likely to please adults as well."

== Track listing ==
No.	Title	Length
1.	"Sam, the Whaler"	11:25
2.	"Abiyoyo"	9:45
3.	"Sweet Little Baby"	2:33
4.	"Sweepy, Sweepy, Sweepy"	2:24
5.	"Where Are My Pajamas?"	1:10
6.	"Green Grass Grows All Around"	4:50
7.	"One Grain of Sand"	9:12
