= Gazette, Vol. 1 =

Studio album by Pete Seeger
- Released: 1958
- Genre: Folk
- Length: 47:51
- Label: Folkways Records
- Producer: Irwin Silber

Pete Seeger chronology
American Favorite Ballads, Vol. 2 (1958)	Gazette, Vol. 1 (1958)	Sleep-Time: Songs & Stories (1958)

Professional ratings
Review scores
Source	Rating
AllMusic	4.5/5 stars

Gazette, Vol. 1 is the fourth studio album by American folk singer Pete Seeger. It was released in 1958 by Folkways Records, and later re-released by Smithsonian Folkways. The album artwork, credited on the album cover to Antonio Frasconi, is by Frasconi's wife Leona Pierce, and the design is by Ronald Clyne.

Selecting material mostly from the pages of Sing Out! magazine, Pete Seeger performs 20 "contemporary topical and political songs," as Folkways Records head Moses Asch puts it, with "contemporary" defined as the 25 years leading up to the album's 1958 release date. Annotator Irwin Silber, who was also editor of Sing Out!, calls the result a "living newspaper of history."

== Track listing ==
No.	Title	Length
1.	"Pretty Boy Floyd"	2:46
2.	"Banks of Marble"	3:17
3.	"The TVA Song"	2:00
4.	"Martian Love Song"	2:08
5.	"42 Kids"	2:18
6.	"State of Arkansas (My Name is Terry Roberts)"	2:07
7.	"Declaration of Independence"	1:32
8.	"The Wild West Is Where I Want To Be"	1:33
9.	"The Ballad of Sherman Wu"	2:08
10.	"Roll On Columbia"	3:37
11.	"The Sinking of the Reuben James"	2:39
12.	"Then We'll Have Peace"	2:09
13.	"The Scaler"	1:20
14.	"Newspapermen"	3:53
15.	"Talking Atom (Old Man Atom)"	2:30
16.	"Teacher's Blues"	2:33
17.	"The Demi Song"	2:41
18.	"The Battle of Maxton Field"	2:33
19.	"Doctor Freud"	2:12
20.	"There is Mean Things Happening in This Land"	1:55
