= God Bless the Grass =

Album by Pete Seeger

Studio album by Pete Seeger
- Released: January 17, 1966
- Recorded: June 21–22, 1965
- Genre: Folk
- Label: Columbia
- Producer: Tom Wilson

Pete Seeger chronology
We Shall Overcome (1963)	God Bless the Grass (1966)	Dangerous Songs!? (1966)

God Bless The Grass is the sixth studio album by Pete Seeger, released on January 17, 1966 by Columbia Records as CL 2432 (mono) and CS 9232 (stereo). The album cover was designed by R. O. Blechman.

God Bless The Grass focuses on environmental issues and offers inspiration and admiration for nature, taking its title from the included song written by Malvina Reynolds. The songs advocate awareness of the environment and appreciation for the splendor of nature. "My Dirty Stream" for example, supports an environmental organization Seeger formed in 1966 called Hudson River Sloop Clearwater (aka Great Hudson River Revival or Clearwater Festival) that sought to clean up the heavily polluted Hudson River. The liner notes include a message written by then Supreme Court Justice William Douglas.

Professional ratings
Review scores
Source	Rating
AllMusic	4/5 stars
Record Mirror	3/5 stars

== Track listing ==
No.	Title	Writer(s)	Length
1.	"The Power and the Glory"	Phil Ochs	2:28
2.	"Pretty Saro"	Public Domain	3:03
3.	"70 Miles"	Malvina Reynolds	2:22
4.	"The Faucets are Dripping"	Malvina Reynolds	2:00
5.	"Cement Octopus"	Malvina Reynolds	2:21
6.	"God Bless The Grass"	Malvina Reynolds	2:00
7.	"The Quiet Joys of Brotherhood"	Richard Fariña	4:00
8.	"Coal Creek March"	Pete Steele	1:15
9.	"The Girl I Left Behind"	Public Domain	1:16
10.	"I Have a Rabbit"	P. Eliran	1:56
11.	"The People Are Scratching"	Ernie Marrs, Harold Martin, Seeger	3:38
12.	"Coyote, My Little Brother"	Peter La Farge	2:50
13.	"Preserven El Parque Elysian"	M. Kelian	3:14
14.	"My Dirty Stream (The Hudson River Song)"	Pete Seeger	2:30
15.	"Johnny Riley"	Public Domain	0:52
16.	"Barbara Allen"	Public Domain	1:10
17.	"From Way Up Here"	Malvina Reynolds, Pete Seeger	3:00
18.	"My Land is a Good Land"	Eric Andersen	2:19
