= If I Had a Hammer: Songs of Hope & Struggle =

1998 album by Pete Seeger

Compilation album by Pete Seeger
- Released: May 19, 1998
- Genre: Folk
- Length: 1:09:36
- Label: Smithsonian Folkways

Professional ratings
Review scores
Source	Rating
AllMusic	4.5/5 stars

If I Had a Hammer: Songs of Hope & Struggle is a 1998 compilation album by Pete Seeger and was released on Smithsonian Folkways as SFW40096.

This collection is a compilation of 24 songs selected from hundreds released on Folkways Records in the late 1950s and 1960s and two new songs recorded especially for this collection. Pete plays the 5-string banjo and the 12-string guitar and appears on some tracks with Almanac Singers and his grandson Tao Rodríguez-Seeger. The booklet contains detailed notes by Mark Greenberg explaining the origins of each song, as well as how their structures have evolved over the years.

The album is divided into segments addressing "unions and labor," "peace," "civil rights," and "hope."

== Track listing ==
No.	Title	Length
1.	"If I Had a Hammer (Hammer Song)"	1:56
2.	"Banks of Marble"	3:17
3.	"Which Side Are You On?"	2:09
4.	"Casey Jones (The Union Scab)"	1:58
5.	"Talking Union"	3:05
6.	"Joe Hill"	2:32
7.	"Union Maid"	2:16
8.	"Step by Step"	1:37
9.	"Solidarity Forever"	2:54
10.	"Where Have All the Flowers Gone?"	2:05
11.	"Talking Atom (Old Man Atom)"	2:29
12.	"Crow on the Cradle"	2:25
13.	"Last Night I Had the Strangest Dream"	2:30
14.	"Study War No More (Down by the Riverside)"	3:12
15.	"Bourgeois Blues"	2:07
16.	"River of My People"	3:06
17.	"Hold On (Keep Your Hand on the Plow)"	3:21
18.	"We Shall Overcome"	4:42
19.	"He Lies in the American Land"	2:01
20.	"Well May the World Go"	2:40
21.	"Turn, Turn, Turn"	2:46
22.	"Tomorrow is a Highway"	3:32
23.	"Oh, Had I a Golden Thread"	3:29
24.	"We'll All Be A-Doubling"	1:58
25.	"Arrange and Rearrange"	4:52
26.	"If I Had a Hammer (Hammer Song)"	2:10
Total length:		1:09:36

Notes

- I'd Hammer In The Morning (Introduction): Track 1
- Solidarity Forever (Unions And Labor): Tracks 2–9
- Study War No More (Peace): Tracks 10–14
- We Shall Overcome (Civil Rights): Tracks 15–18
- I'd Hammer In The Evening (Hope): Tracks 19–26
