= American Favorite Ballads, Vol. 2 =

Studio album by Pete Seeger
- Released: 1958
- Genre: Folk
- Length: 45:22
- Label: Folkways Records
- Producer: Moses Asch

Pete Seeger chronology
American Favorite Ballads, Vol. 1 (1957)	American Favorite Ballads, Vol. 2 (1958)	Gazette, Vol. 1 (1958)

Professional ratings
Review scores
Source	Rating
AllMusic	4/5 stars

American Favorite Ballads, Vol. 2 is the third studio album by American folk singer Pete Seeger. It was released in 1958 by Folkways Records, and later reissued in 2003 by Smithsonian Folkways.

== Track listing ==
No.	Title	Length
1.	"Oh, Susanna"	1:17
2.	"The Riddle Song"	2:29
3.	"Oh, What a Beautiful City"	3:30
4.	"Sally Ann"	1:30
5.	"House of the Rising Sun"	2:38
6.	"Shenandoah"	1:53
7.	"The Midnight Special"	3:07
8.	"Careless Love"	3:07
9.	"Hard Traveling"	2:46
10.	"Poor Boy"	2:15
11.	"Black Girl (In the Pines)"	2:34
12.	"Alabama Bound"	2:19
13.	"Stagger Lee"	2:16
14.	"Black is the Color of My True Love's Hair"	2:29
15.	"Go Tell Aunt Rhodie"	3:14
16.	"The Water Is Wide"	3:37
17.	"The Fox"	2:05
18.	"The Keeper and The Doe"	2:16
