= American Folk Songs for Children =

Studio album by Pete Seeger
- Released: 1953
- Genre: Folk
- Label: Folkways Records

American Folk Songs for Children is a studio album released by Pete Seeger in 1953 by Folkways Records. It was Seeger's first solo album.

== Track listing ==
1. "Bought Me a Cat"
2. "The Blue Tailed Fly (Jimmie Crack Corn)"
3. "Train is A-Coming"
4. "This Old Man"
5. "Froggie Went A-Courting"
6. "Jim Along Josie"
7. "There Was a Man and He Was Mad"
8. "Clap Your Hands"
9. "She'll Be Coming Around the Mountain"
10. "All Around the Kitchen"
11. "Billy Barlow"

== Background ==
Seeger selected the eleven songs for the album from an anthology of folk songs for children that had been published by his stepmother, Ruth Crawford Seeger, in her 1948 book titled American Folk Songs For Children, ISBN 0-385-15788-6, a book of musical notations and notated guides. The album's liner notes included a subject index for parents and teachers, complete lyric sheet, and recommended activities for each song. The album was re-released in 2000 by Smithsonian Folkways with an expanded track list.

== Critical reception ==
Allmusic wrote that "Seeger renders them plainly and simply, singing and playing banjo, on a program designed especially (but not solely) for children between three and seven years of age." About Entertainment rated the album five stars and said, "This is a great album for family sing-alongs, for classroom use, and for children's entertainers who need a solid performance catalog." Record Roundup stated that, "Pete sings them all with great enthusiasm."

== See also ==
- Old American Songs
- Carl Sandburg
