= The Denial of Saint Peter =

The Denial of Saint Peter may refer to:

- The Denial of Saint Peter (Caravaggio)
- The Denial of Saint Peter (Rembrandt)
- The Denial of Saint Peter (Hendrick ter Brugghen)
- The Denial of Saint Peter (La Tour)
