= Zegers =

Zegers is a Dutch-language and German-language patronymic surname (son of Zeger).

Notable persons with the name Zegers or variant Zeegers include:

- Afrodite Zegers (born 1991), Greek born Dutch competitive sailor
- Antonia Zegers (born 1972), Chilean actress
- Gerard Zegers (1591–1651), Flemish painter, art collector and art dealer
- Isidora Zegers (1803–1869), Spanish artist and composer
- Jacobus Zegers (died 1644), printer in Leuven
- Jacques Zegers (born 1947), Belgian singer
- Kevin Zegers (born 1984), Canadian actor
- Kristoffer Zegers (born 1973), Dutch composer
- Margriet Zegers (born 1954), Dutch field hockey player
- Nicholas Tacitus Zegers (c. 1495–1559), Flemish biblical exegete

Zeegers

- Bram Zeegers (1949–2007), Dutch lawyer
- Guus Zeegers (1906–1978), Dutch middle-distance runner
- Jan Zeegers (1902–1978), Dutch middle-distance runner
- Leonne Zeegers, (born 1961), Dutch LGBT pioneer

== See also ==
- Segers
- Seghers
- Seegers
