= Peter's Denial (disambiguation) =

Peter's Denial or the denial of Peter is a biblical episode in which Apostle Peter disowns Jesus.

Peter's Denial may also refer to:

- The Denial of Saint Peter (Caravaggio), a painting
- "Peter's Denial" (song), a song from Jesus Christ Superstar
