= Christ and the Penitent Sinners =

Painting by Peter Paul Rubens

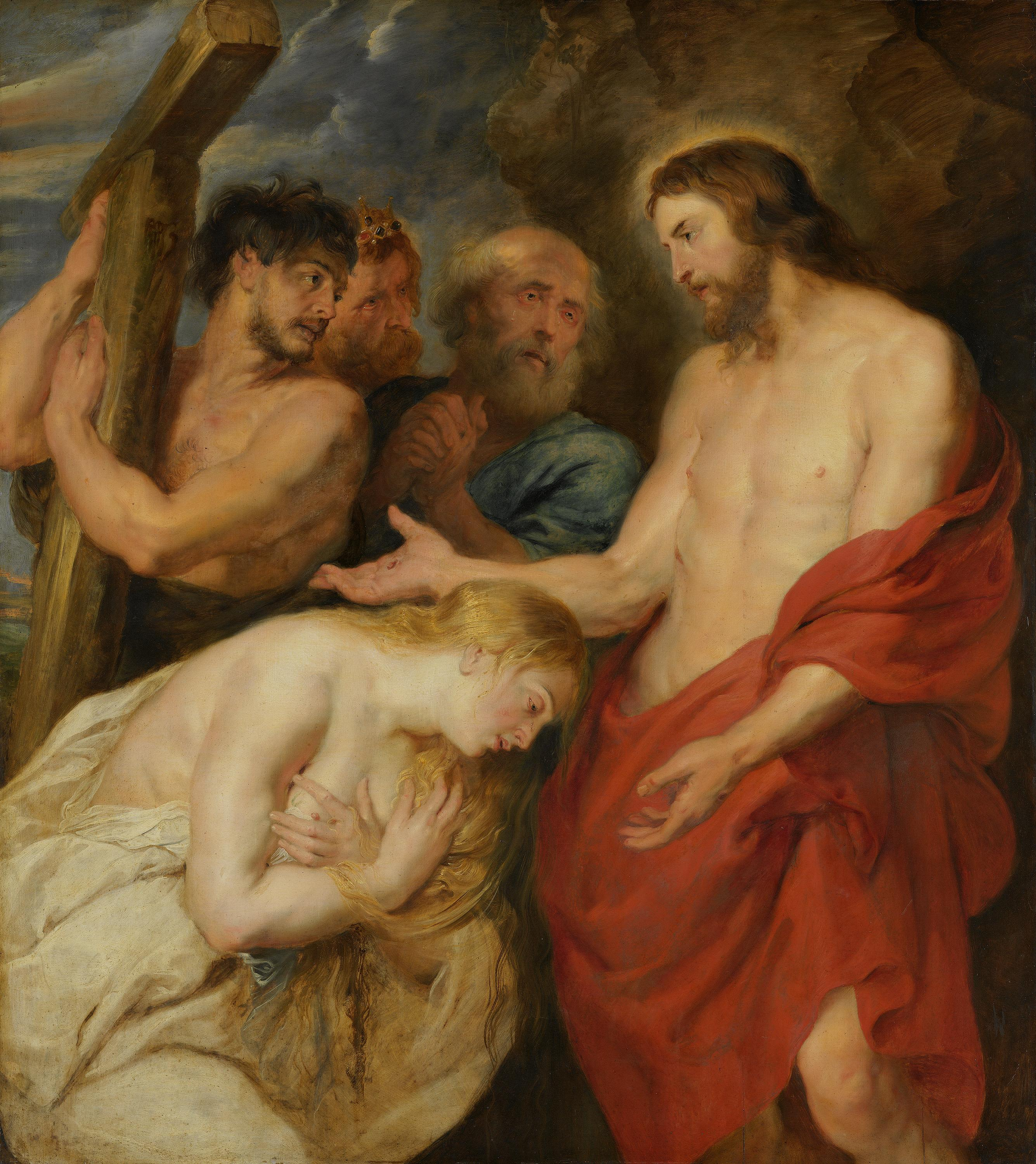
Christ and the Penitent Sinners (1617) by Rubens

Christ and the Penitent Sinners or Christ with the four great penitents is an oil on canvas painting by Peter Paul Rubens, executed in 1617. It is now in the Alte Pinakothek in Munich.

The painting depicts Jesus Christ with an adoring Mary Magdalene, Saint Peter (who denied Christ three times), Dismas (the penitent thief from the Crucifixion) and King David (who committed adultery with Bathsheba).
