= Seghers =

Seghers is a surname. Notable people with this surname include:

- Anna Seghers (pen name of Anna Reiling, 1900–1983), German writer
- Anne-Marie Seghers (1911–2012), French tennis player
- Armand Seghers (1926–2005), Belgian footballer
- Carroll Seghers II (1924–2004), American photographer
- Charles John Seghers (1839–1886), Belgian clergyman and missionary
- Daniel Seghers (1590–1661), Flemish Jesuit and painter
- Emilius Seghers (1855–1927), Belgian bishop
- Gerard Seghers (1591–1651), Flemish painter
- Hercules Seghers (c. 1589 – c. 1638), Dutch painter and printmaker
- Jean Seghers, Belgian racewalker
- Pierre Seghers (1906–1987), French poet and editor
- Samuel Seghers (born 1994), Papua New Guinean swimmer

== See also ==
Related surnames

- Seger
- Seeger
- Segers
- Zegers
- Segert
