= Seegers =

Seegers is a patronymic surname. Notable persons with that name include:

- Doug Seegers, American guitarist and songwriter
- Rainer Seegers (born 1952), German percussionist and timpanist
- Wendy Seegers (born 1976), South African athlete
- William Seegers (1900–2007), American soldier

== See also ==
- Segers
- Zeegers
