= Zeger =

Zeger is a Dutch-language masculine given name. It is derived from the Germanic roots "sigi-" (victory) and "-her" (lord). Related spellings are Seger, Segher, Sieger and Zeeger. People with the name include:

Zeger

- Zeger III of Ghent (died 1227), Flemish noble
- Zeger II of Edingen (died 1364), Brabantian/Walloon Count
- Zeger Bernhard van Espen (1646–1728), Flemish canonist
- Zeger Jacob van Helmont (1683–1726), Flemish painter and tapestry designer

Zeeger

- Zeeger Gulden (1875–1960), Dutch architect

Seger

- Seger Ellis (1904–1995), American jazz pianist and vocalist

Segher

- Segher Diengotgaf, 13th-century Brabantian writer

Sieger

- Sieger Sloot (born 1977), Dutch actor

== See also ==
- Seger, a surname and a town in Pennsylvania
- Seeger, a surname
- Sieger Tod, 1920 German silent film ("Death the Victor")
