= Segert =

Segert may refer to:

- Josef Ferdinand Norbert Segert (Seger, Seeger, Seegr) (1716–1782), a Bohemian organist
- Stanislav Segert (1921–2005), a Czech scholar of Semitic languages

== See also ==
Related surnames

- Seger
- Seghers
