= Segers =

Segers is a Dutch patronymic surname. The mostly archaic Dutch given names Seger, Segher, Sieger and Zegher derive from Germanic Sigi- and -her, meaning "victorious lord". People with the surname Segers include

- Carlos Segers (1900–1967), Argentine astronomer
- Geno Segers (born 1978), American actor
- Gert-Jan Segers (born 1969), Dutch political scientist and politician
- Gunter Segers (born 1968), Belgian children's book author and illustrator
- Gustaaf Segers (1848–1930), Belgian writer and scholar
- Hans Segers (born 1961), Dutch goalkeeper
- Hercules Segers (1589–1638), Dutch painter and printmaker
- Jules Segers (born 2002), French para-alpine skier
- Jan Segers (born 1929), Belgian composer, conductor and reed player
- Noël Segers (born 1959), Belgian racing cyclist
- Paul Segers (1870–1946), Belgian government minister
- Paul-Willem Segers (1900–1983), Belgian government minister
- Willy Segers (born 1958), Belgian politician

== See also ==
- Mount Segers, Antarctic mountain named after Chester W. Segers

Related surnames:

- Seger
- Segert
- Seghers
- Zegers
