= The Denial of Saint Peter (Rembrandt) =

1660 painting by Rembrandt

- De verloochening van Petrus (Dutch)
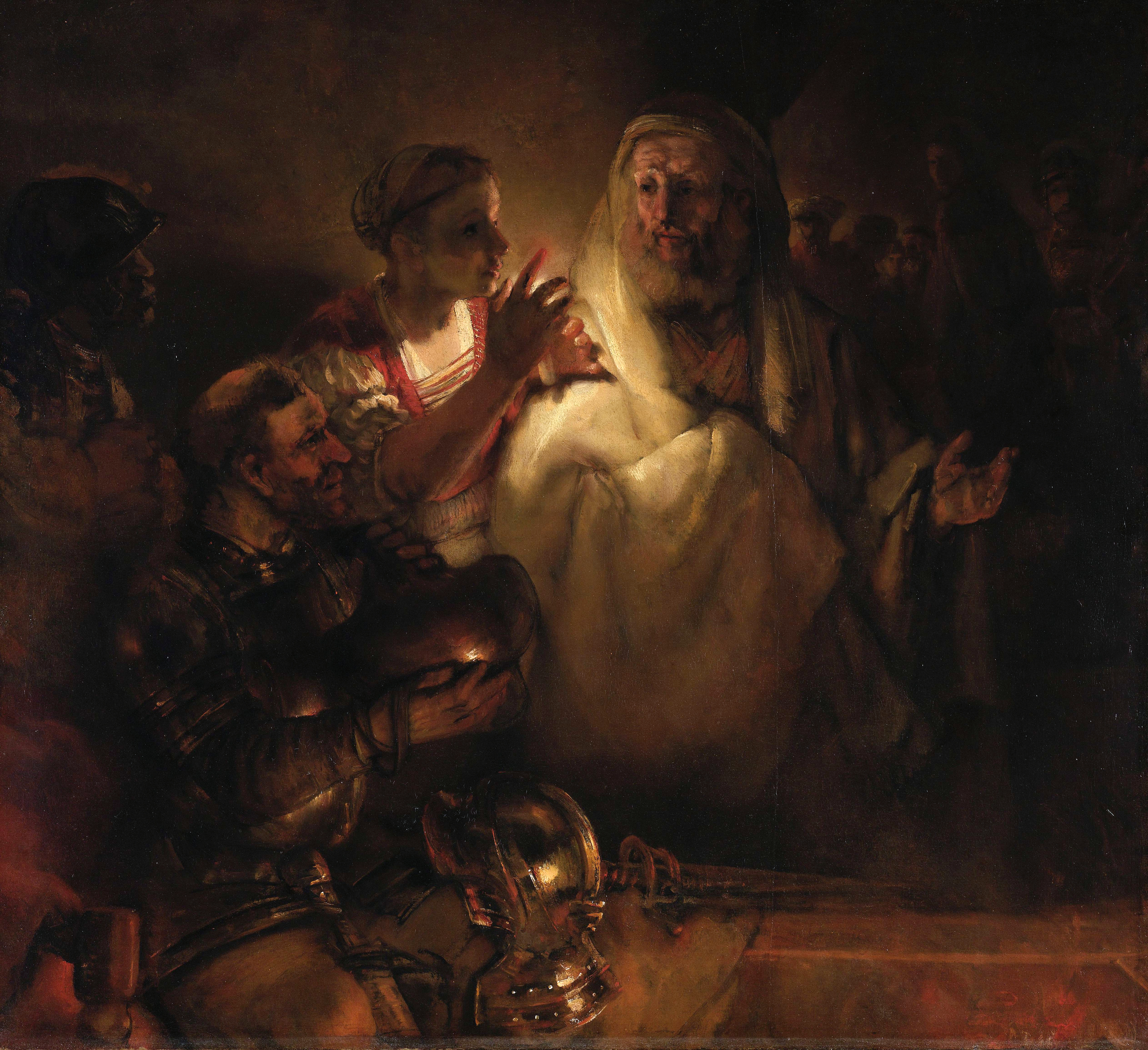
- The Denial of Saint Peter
- Artist: Rembrandt
- Year: 1660
- Type: painting
- Medium: oil on canvas
- Subject: The three acts of denial of Jesus by the Apostle Peter as described in the four Gospels of the New Testament.
- Dimensions: 154 cm × 169 cm (61 in × 67 in)
- Location: Rijksmuseum, Amsterdam
- Owner: Rijksmuseum
- Accession: SK-A-3137

The Denial of Peter is a 1660 painting by Rembrandt, now in the Rijksmuseum in Amsterdam. It depicts the denial of Peter, an event in the Passion of Jesus.

After the Last Supper, Jesus has been arrested, and taken to the house of the high priest Caiaphas for trial by the Sanhedrin. The apostle Peter has gone after Jesus, where a servant woman had recognised him as one of Jesus's followers. Peter in a white robe gestures his denial, as two armed guards observe to the left. In the background, Christ looks over his shoulder as he is led away to Pilate's court.

The painting measures 154 cm × 169 cm (61 in × 67 in). It is signed and dated, "Rembrandt 1660".

Rembrandt never made a journey to Italy, as many of his contemporaries did. It is therefore thought that his treatment of themes such as the Denial derived substantially from prints based on foreign works. In this case there are two engravings, both based on paintings by the Flemish artist Gerard Seghers, which are implicated in Rembrandt's Denial. The first is by Schelte a Bolswert, the second an engraving by Giovanni Antonio de Paoli.

After passing through the hands of several art collectors and dealers in the Netherlands and then France, the painting was sold with 118 other artworks to Catherine II of Russia in 1781. It remained in the collection of the Hermitage Museum in St Petersburg until it was sold secretly with other works by the government of the Soviet Union. It was bought by the Rijksmuseum in Amsterdam in 1933.

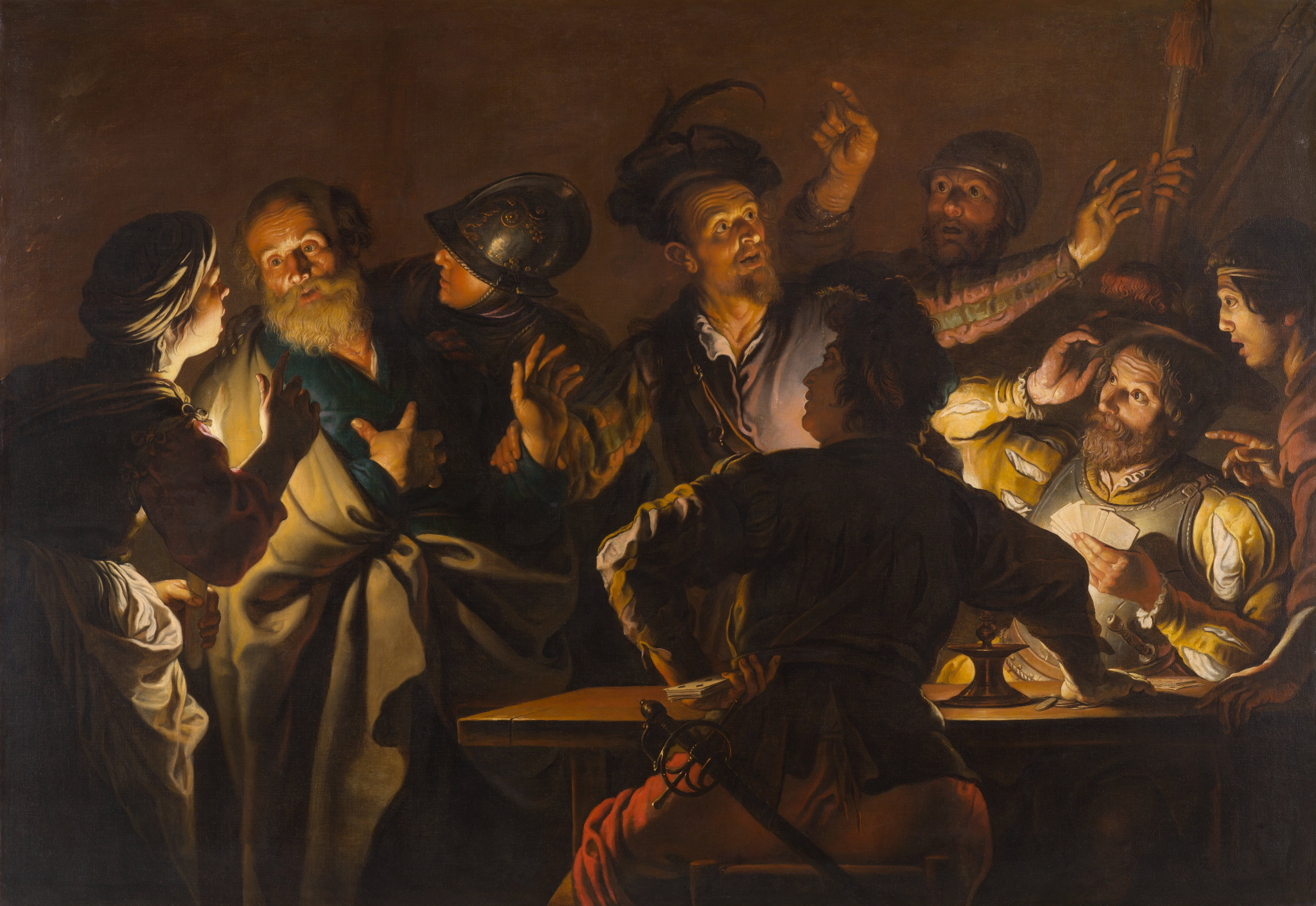
Painting by Gerard Seghers, c.1623

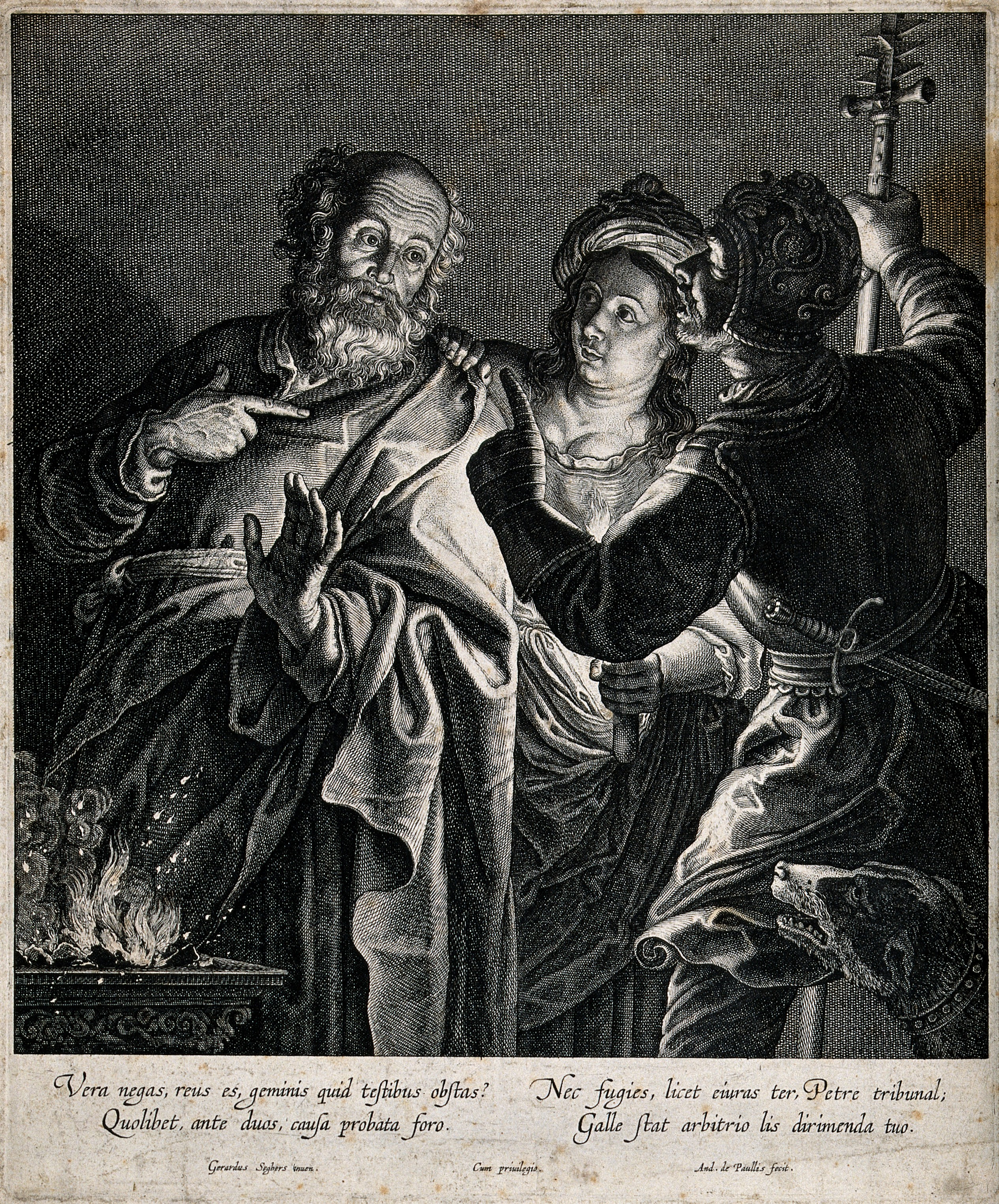
Engraving by Giovanni Antonio de Paoli

== See also ==
- List of paintings by Rembrandt

== Bibliography ==
- Roberta D'Adda, Rembrandt, Milano, Skira, 2006.
