= Denial of Peter =

Episode from the Passion of Christ

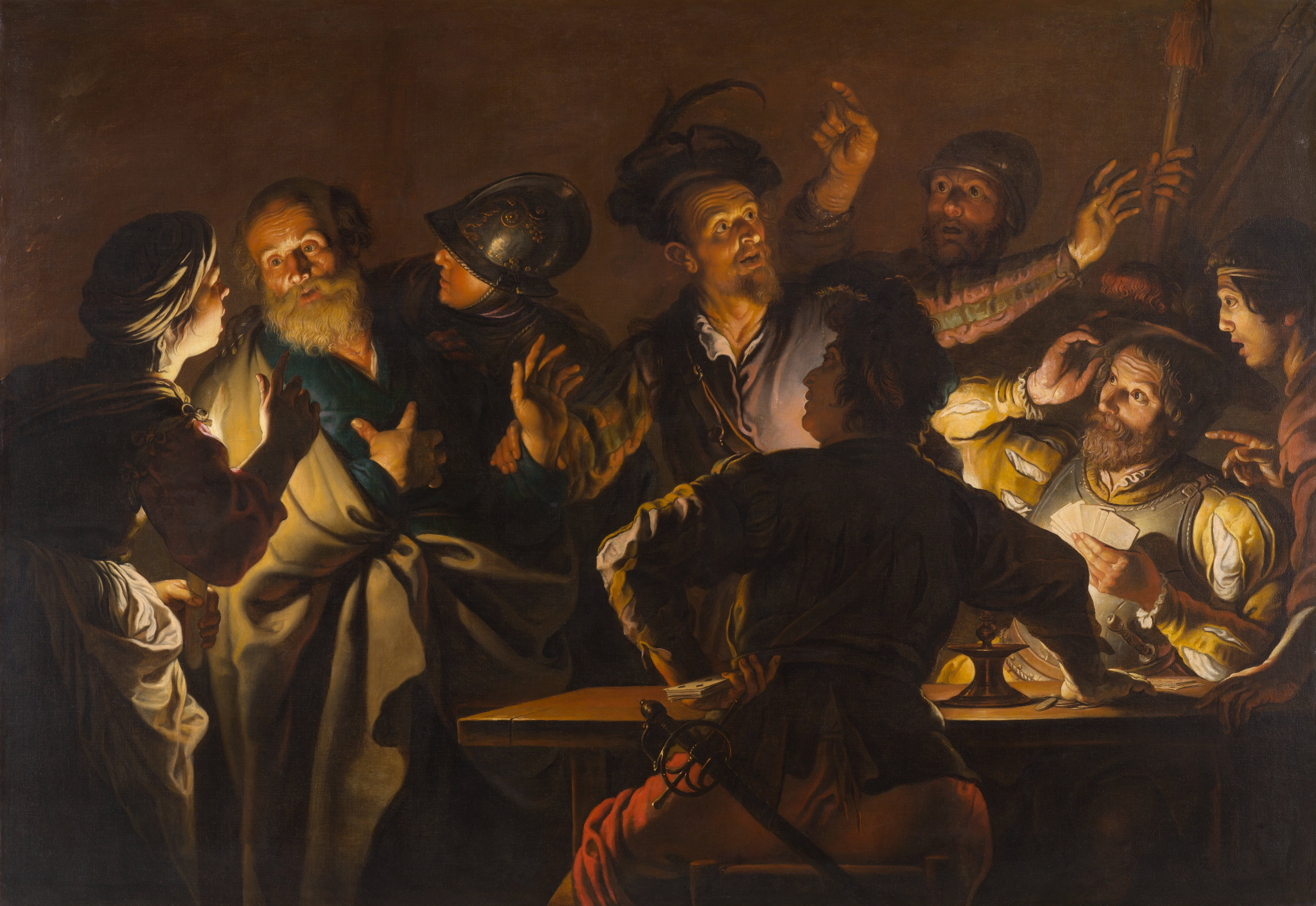
The Denial of Saint Peter, an oil-on-canvas painting by Gerard Seghers, dating to around 1620–25 and now held by the North Carolina Museum of Art

The Denial of Peter (or Peter's Denial) refers to three acts of denial of Jesus by the Apostle Peter as described in all four Gospels of the New Testament. Most New Testament scholars accept the historicity of the Denial of Peter.

All four Canonical Gospels state that during Jesus's Last Supper with his disciples, he predicted that Peter would deny knowledge of him, stating that Peter would disown him before the rooster crowed the next morning. (Note: In some manuscripts of the Gospel of Mark, Jesus says that by the time the rooster had crowed twice, Peter would have denied him three times—the rooster crows once when Peter goes out to an entryway from the courtyard of the high priest after his first denial to a servant girl of the high priest and again as soon as he denies Jesus to a small group, which may have already heard him make his second denial to the servant girl.) Following the arrest of Jesus, Peter denied knowing him three times, but after the third denial, he heard the rooster crow and recalled the prediction as Jesus turned to look at him. Peter then began to cry bitterly. (Note: In the Gospel of John, Peter does not react to the rooster's crowing; unlike the Synoptics, he is not said to recall Jesus' prediction nor to express regret about his denials.) This final incident is known as the Repentance of Peter.

The turbulent emotions behind Peter's denial and later repentance have been the subject of major works of art for centuries. Examples include Caravaggio's Denial of Saint Peter, which is now at the Metropolitan Museum of Art. The incidents have also inspired segments in various films related to the life and death of Jesus Christ (for instance, when Francesco De Vito performed as Peter in The Passion of the Christ) as well as references in musical works, both religious and secular.

== Biblical accounts ==
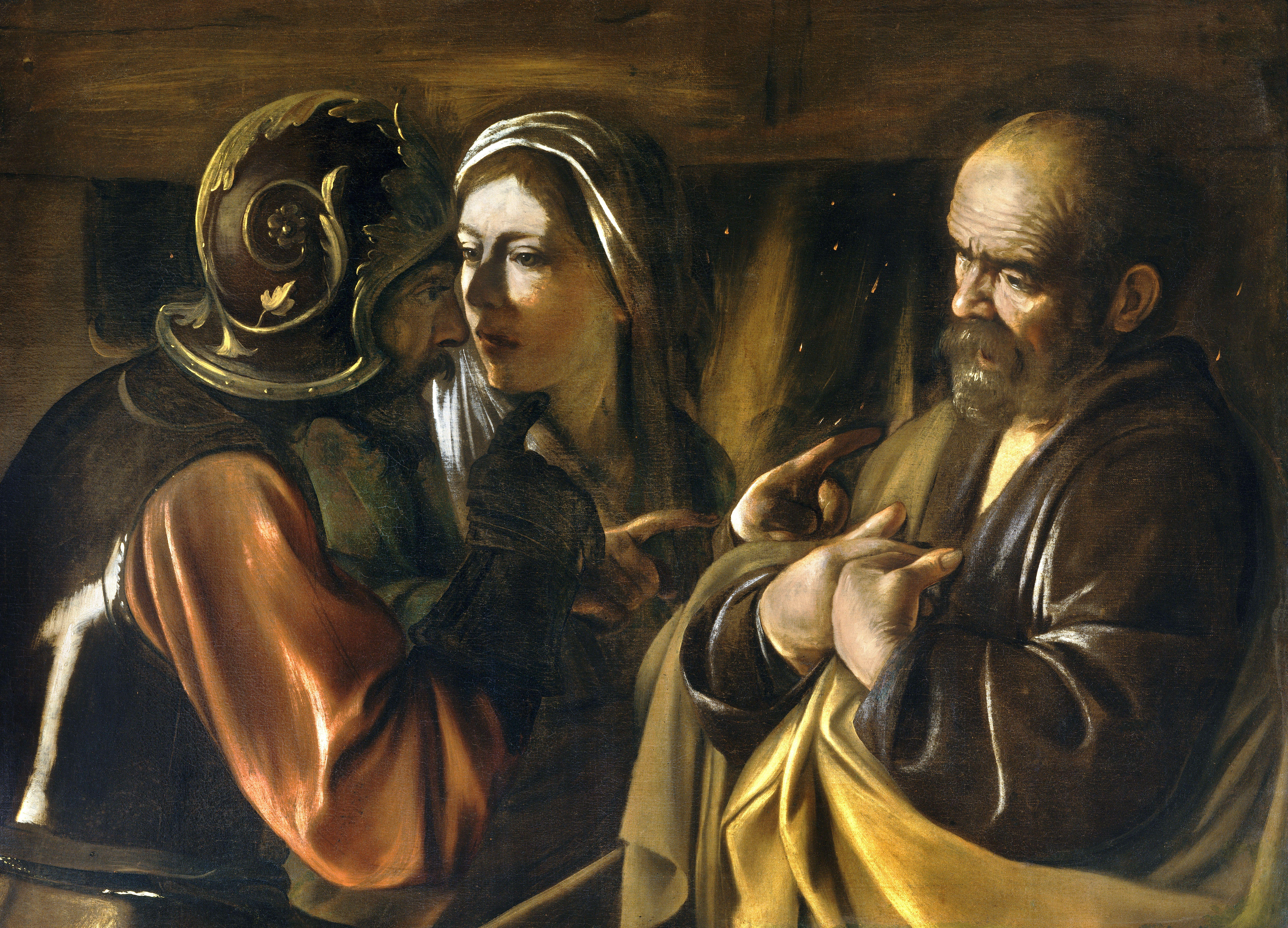
The Denial of Saint Peter by Caravaggio

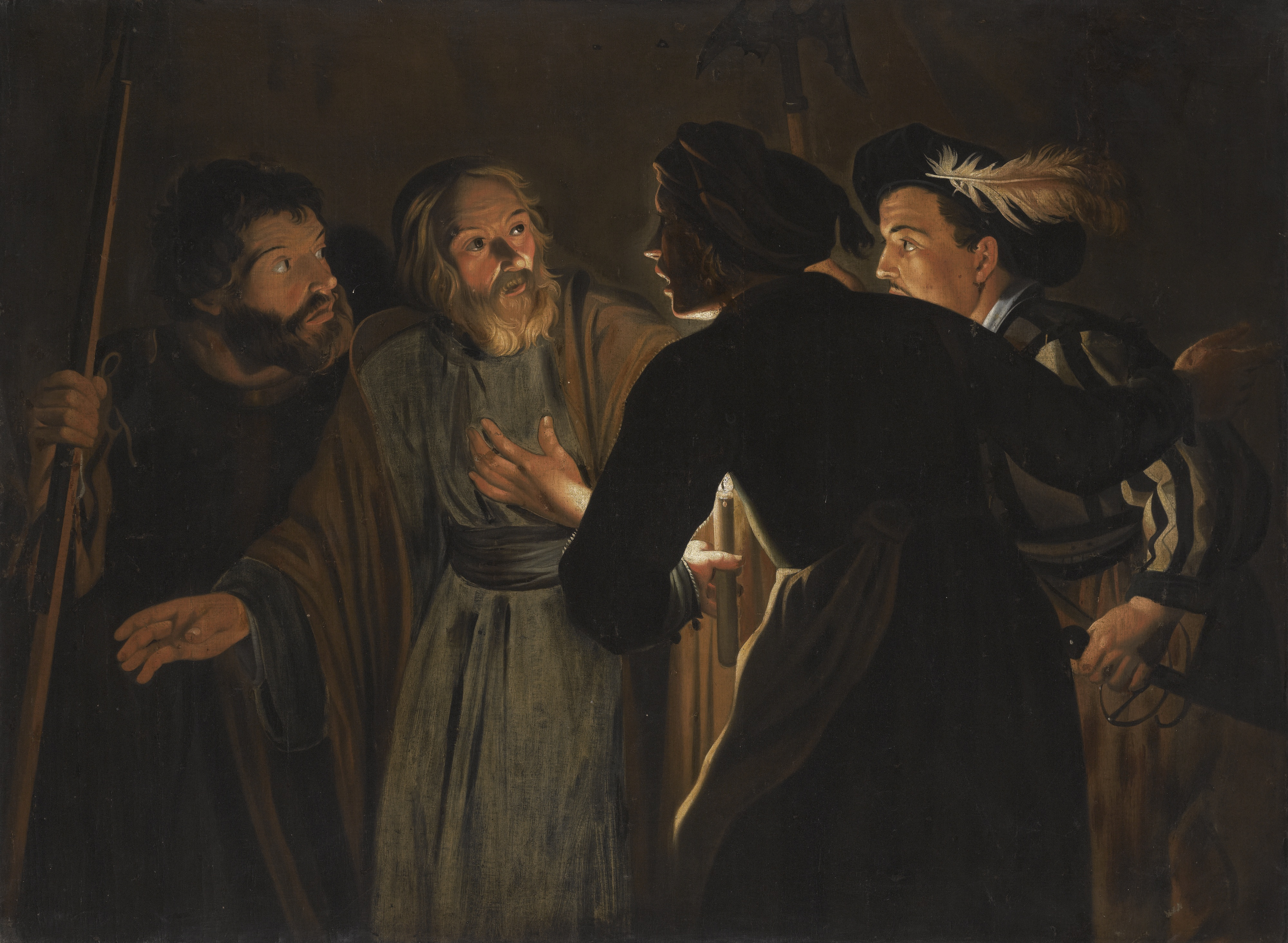
Flemish painting: Denial of Saint Peter by Gerard Seghers

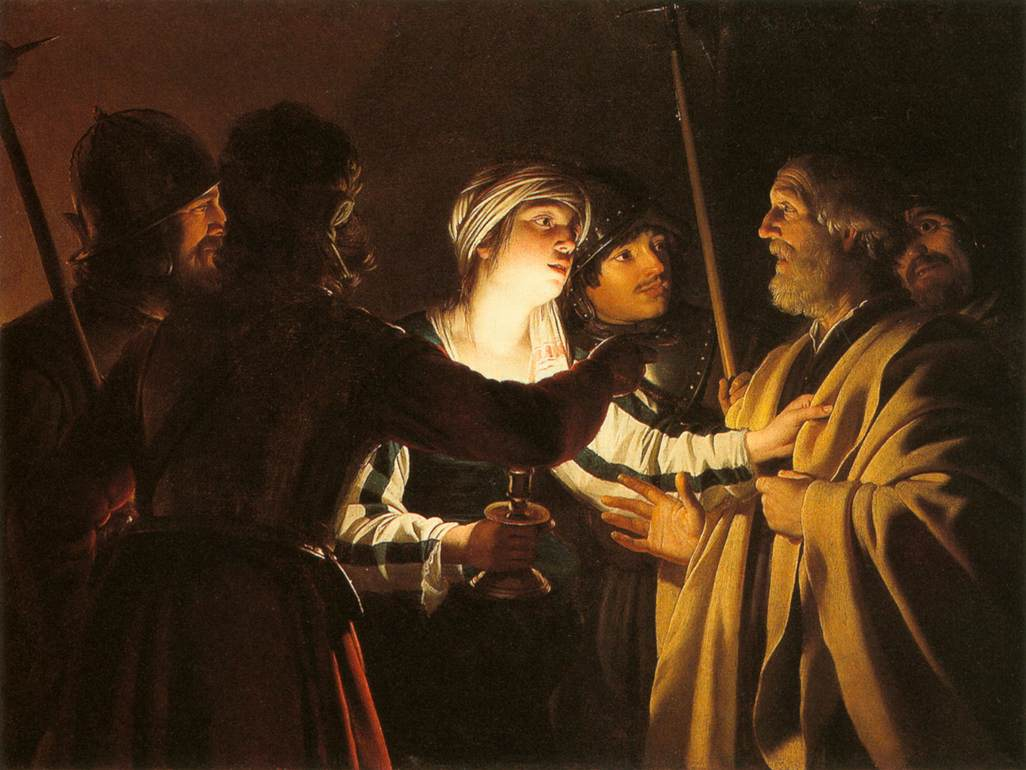
The Denial of St Peter by Gerard van Honthorst (1622–24)

The prediction, made by Jesus during the Last Supper that Peter would deny and disown him, appears in the Gospel of Matthew 26:33–35, the Gospel of Mark 14:29–31, the Gospel of Luke 22:33–34 and the Gospel of John 13:36–38. The denial accounts in the Gospels differ from each other.

According to the Gospel of Matthew:

Peter replied, "Even if all fall away on account of you, I never will." "I tell you the truth," Jesus answered, "This very night, before the rooster crows, you will disown me three times." But Peter declared, "Even if I have to die with you, I will never disown you." And all the other disciples said the same.

Later that night, Jesus was arrested. The first denial to a servant girl in Luke 22:54–57 is as follows:

Then they seized him and led him away, bringing him into the high priest's house. Peter followed at a distance and when they had kindled a fire in the middle of the courtyard and had sat down together, Peter sat down with them. A servant girl saw him seated there in the firelight. She looked closely at him and said, "This man was with him." Panic stricken, he denied it. "Woman, I don't know him," he said.

The second denial to the same girl in Mark 14:69–70 is:

When the servant girl saw him there, she said again to those standing around, "This fellow is one of them." Again he denied it.

The third denial to a number of people, is emphatic as he curses according to Matthew 26:73–75:

After a little while, those standing there went up to Peter and said, "Surely you are one of them, for your accent gives you away." Then he began to call down curses on himself and he swore to them, "I don't know the man!" Immediately a rooster crowed. Then Peter remembered the word Jesus had spoken: "Before the rooster crows, you will disown me three times." And he went outside and wept bitterly.

The Gospel of Luke 22:59–62 describes the moment of the last denial as follows:

About an hour later another asserted, "Certainly this fellow was with him, for he is a Galilean." Peter replied, "Man, I don't know what you're talking about!" Just as he was speaking, the rooster crowed. The Lord turned and looked straight at Peter. Then Peter remembered the word the Lord had spoken to him: "Before the rooster crows today, you will disown me three times." And he went outside and wept bitterly.

The Gospel of John 18:15–27 describes the account of the three denials as follows:

Simon Peter and another disciple were following Jesus. Because this disciple was known to the high priest, he went with Jesus into the high priest's courtyard, but Peter had to wait outside at the door. The other disciple, who was known to the high priest, came back, spoke to the girl on duty there and brought Peter in. "You are not one of his disciples, are you?" the girl at the door asked Peter. He replied, "I am not." ... As Simon Peter stood warming himself, he was asked, "You are not one of his disciples, are you?" He denied it, saying, "I am not." One of the high priest's servants, a relative of the man whose ear Peter had cut off, challenged him, "Didn't I see you with him in the olive grove?" Again Peter denied it, and at that moment a rooster began to crow.

Following the resurrection of Jesus, the Gospel of John 21:15–17 narrates how Jesus asked Peter three times if Peter loved him, pointing to the rehabilitation of Peter following his repentance.

== Context and traditions ==
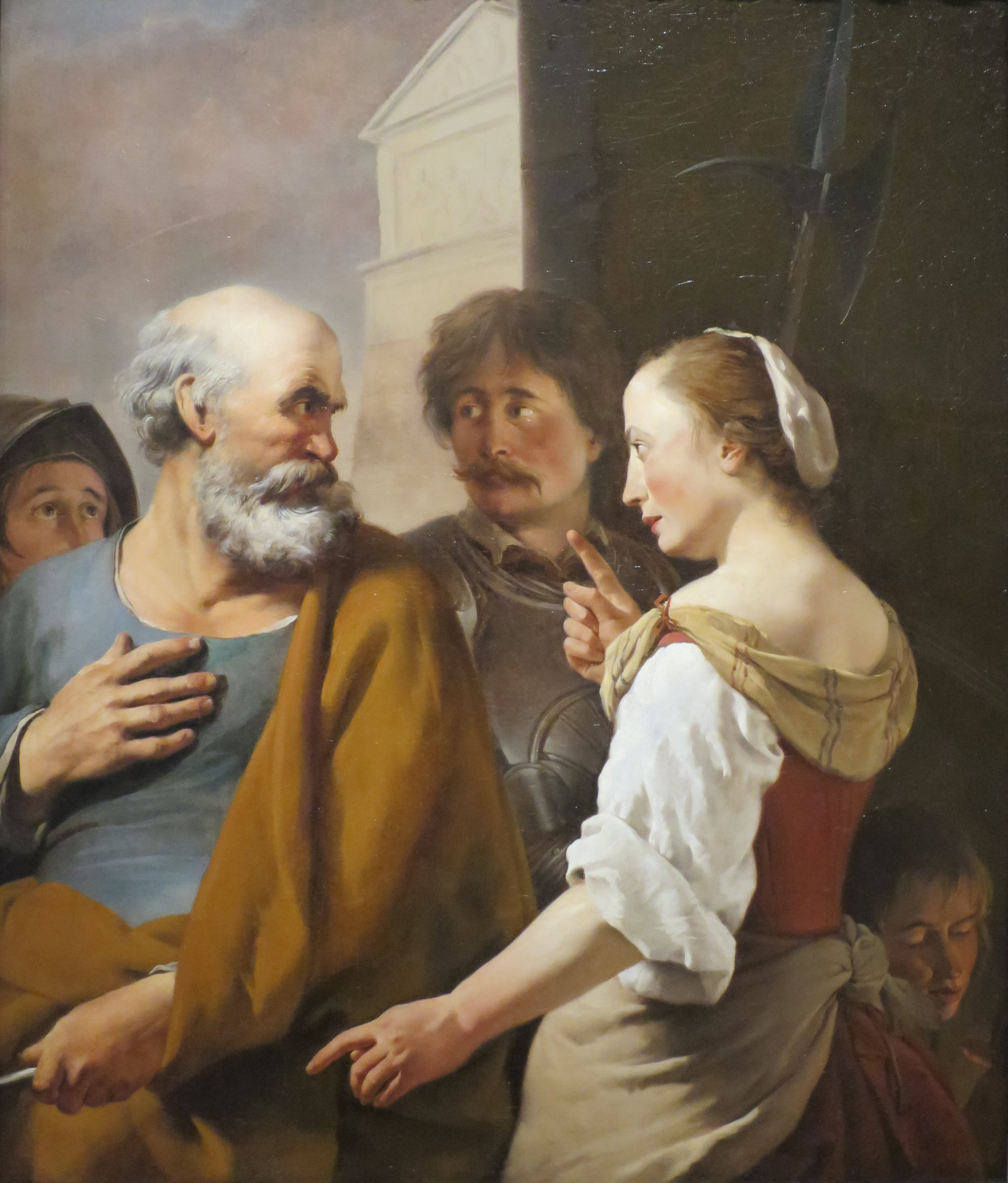
Karel Dujardin, Denial of Peter

=== Context ===
For much of the period of three years that Jesus spent in ministry, gathering and teaching disciples, he had been observed, criticised and harassed by scholars and priests. His teachings were sometimes seen as heretical and his actions in gathering a group of disciples as possibly having political motivation. Jesus's capture and trials were the culmination of this antipathy.

Peter was one of the twelve disciples most closely associated with Jesus. His denials are made in the face of accusation that he was "with Jesus", the term indicating the bond of discipleship. The Gospel of Matthew states that Peter denied Jesus "in front of everyone", thus making a public witness, affirming this with an oath. Throughout his Gospel, Matthew stresses the importance of public witness as an essential element of discipleship, stating in Matthew 10:32–33: "Whoever acknowledges me before men, I will also acknowledge him before my Father in heaven. But whoever disowns me before men, I will disown him before my Father in heaven." Peter's denial is in direct conflict with the nature of discipleship, as described by Matthew. Matthew has also previously reported Jesus's teaching forbidding the use of an oath:

"Again you have heard that it was said to those of old, 'You shall not swear falsely, but shall perform your oaths to the Lord'. But I say to you, do not swear at all: neither by heaven, for it is God's throne; nor by the earth, for it is His footstool; nor by Jerusalem, for it is the city of the great King. Nor shall you swear by your head, because you cannot make one hair white or black. But let your 'Yes' be 'Yes,' and your 'No,' 'No.' For whatever is more than these is from the evil one.

The New Testament descriptions of Peter's denial depict the drama of the incident. Peter's antagonists in the discussion of his discipleship progress from a maid, to a maid plus a bystander, to a whole crowd. His denial progresses from a plea of ignorance, to a denial plus an oath and then to cursing and swearing with a total denial that he ever knew Jesus. The significance of three denials lies in its superlative force; it underscores the disciple's resolve to deny Jesus (see Biblical numerology). The sound of the rooster then brings a shock to Peter that Jesus had predicted the three denials.

This episode has been seen as an incident that sheds light on the unique role of Peter and sets him apart from the other disciples, just as in the Gospel of Mark 16:7 in which the angel tells the women to "go and tell his disciples and Peter" about the resurrection of Jesus. In this episode, as often elsewhere in the Gospel of Mark, Peter acts as the focus of the apostles, and an essential Christological image is presented: the denials of Peter contrast with the frank confessions of Jesus in his trial by the Sanhedrin, portraying his faithfulness as prophet, Son and Messiah.

The triple denial of Peter is the impetus for the three repetitive questions made by Jesus to Peter at the Sea of Galilee after his resurrection, "Simon, son of John, Do you love me?" Although originally interpreted by Peter as a rebuke for his three denials (also due to the use by Jesus of his old name "Simon"), this event became later viewed as a redemptive act by Jesus, allowing Peter to publicly declare in front of his fellow disciples that he truly did love his Lord and thus become fully restored to his faith community.

The three 'denials' are also present in a Gnostic source, the Gnostic Apocalypse of Peter from the Nag Hammadi library, but the roles are reversed in the context of meditation and seeing inner vision of the Master. In the Gnostic Apocalypse of Peter, Jesus denies Peter "three times in this night" as not ready for inner sight, 72,5. Both details of "three times" denied and "in this night" being present suggests a relationship to the canonical portrayal of the Denial of Peter.

=== Historicity ===
Most New Testament scholars accept the historicity of the Denial of Peter. According to Maurice Casey, the Gospel of Mark's narrative of Peter's denial is largely historical, as the church would not have created such an embarrassing story. John P. Meier agreed that the denial of Jesus by Peter after he was arrested is historically accurate.

=== Prayers and traditions ===
Bishop Lancelot Andrewes composed the following prayer:

O Lord Jesus Christ, look upon us with those eyes of thine where-with thou dist look upon Peter in the hall; that with Peter we may repent and, by the same love be forgiven; for thine endless mercy's sake. Amen.

— Aitken 2006, p. 58

Referring to the tears shed by Peter during his repentance in the context of the Sacrament of Penance, Saint Ambrose said that "in the Church, there are water and tears: the water of Baptism and the tears of repentance". Traditionally, "tears of repentance", as exemplified by Peter, have become a symbol both of mourning and comfort and a sign at once of sins repented and forgiveness sought.

In the Scriptural Way of the Cross, introduced in 1991 by Pope John Paul II as a version of the Stations of the Cross and performed each Good Friday at the Colosseum in Rome, the fourth station is the Denial of Peter.

During Holy Week in Jerusalem, vigils at times stop at a location traditionally considered the location for the Repentance of Peter, not far from the house of High Priest Caiaphas, involved in the trial of Jesus.

== Commentary ==
Justus Knecht comments on Peter's denial saying:

The causes of Peter's fall were these: 1. He did not avoid the proximate occasions of sin; for at the time of his fall he was associating with the enemies of Christ. If he had left their company even after his first denial, he would not have fallen so low. "He that loves danger shall perish in it" (Ecclus. 3:27). 2. He had paid too little attention to our Lord's warning words: "Satan hath desired to sift you as wheat . . . This night thou shalt deny Me thrice"; and he trusted too much in himself: "Though all shall be scandalized, yet not I. I will lay down my life for Thee!" When he said those words he meant them, for Peter had a very firm faith in our Lord, and an ardent love for Him; but he ought not to have forgotten that he was a weak man, and that without God's grace he could not remain faithful. Our Lord had said to him but a very short time before, as they were walking up the Mount of Olives: "Without Me you can do nothing!" 3. He fell, therefore, through over self-confidence, and by neglecting our Lord's exhortation: "Watch and pray, that ye enter not into temptation!"

Roger Baxter reflects on Peter's lack of faith in his Meditations, writing:

A few hours before Peter had said, 'Though I should die with Thee, I will not deny Thee;' but now, alas! at the first word of a woman, from shame and fear he denies that he ever knew Him. How many are there now in existence who, not from any humility, but from mere apprehension of what the world will say, are afraid to own any Christian or virtuous action and to profess themselves followers of Christ!

John P. Meier argues that the criterion of embarrassment gives the story a strong claim to authenticity, but it also could have been a substitute for an even greater misdeed of Peter.

== In art and music ==
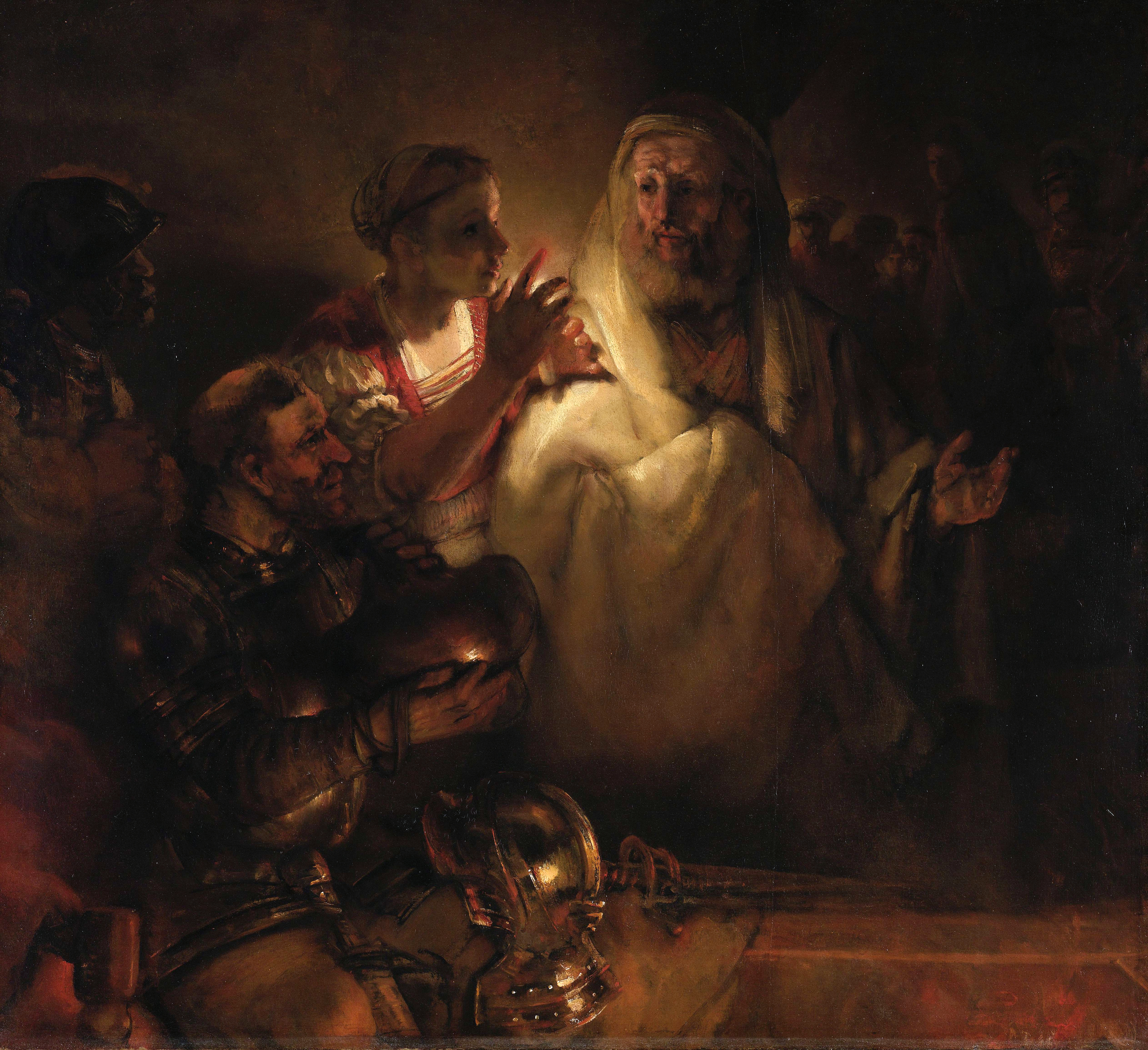
Rembrandt: The Denial of Saint Peter, 1660

The episode has been the subject of works of art for centuries. It has also been dramatized in musical settings of the Passion story. It has been depicted in a varieties of mediums and methods, ranging from 6th century mosaic at the Basilica of Sant'Apollinare Nuovo to Russian icons and oil paintings by many old masters. The subject was sometimes included in cycles of the Life of Christ or the Passion, often as the only scene not to include the figure of Christ.

In Rembrandt's 1660 depiction of The Denial of Saint Peter, now in the Rijksmuseum, Amsterdam, influenced by engravings of the c.1623 version by Gerard Seghers, he presents the servant girl who recognizes Peter with a candle, illuminating Peter's face. Two soldiers look with suspicion as Peter speaks, while Jesus is shown in the distance, his hands bound behind him, turning to look at Peter. Peter faces away from Jesus, and he gestures with his left hand, although his expression is free of defiance.

Caravaggio's 1610 Denial of Saint Peter is now at the Metropolitan Museum of Art in New York. Author George Weatherhead admires Caravaggio's depiction, the way Peter exhibits a wavering trepidation in his unsteady features, conscious of the unworthy falsehood he was telling. His lips quiver and his eyes seek, yet can not find the firmness of truth. In this painting, Caravaggio portrayed the servant girl using the same head of the woman that he used in his depiction of The Beheading of Saint John the Baptist.

A related subject, the "Repentance of Peter", showing the end of the episode, was not often seen before Catholic Counter-Reformation art, where it became popular as an assertion of the sacrament of Confession against Protestant attacks. This followed an influential book by the Jesuit Cardinal Robert Bellarmine (1542–1621). The image typically shows Peter in tears, as a half-length portrait with no other figures, often with hands clasped as at right, and sometimes the cock in the background; it was often coupled with a repentant Mary Magdalen, another exemplar from Bellarmine's book.

Georges de La Tour reprised this penitential iconography in Saint Peter Repentant (1645) but added a lantern by the saint's feet and a dangling vine above the cock. These allusions to Peter's denial as a lapse from his rightful path and break with the bonds of discipleship are elaborated in Georges de La Tour's Denial of Saint Peter (1650).

The Passion story has been set in music by numerous composers, including Roland de Lassus, Lodovico Agostini and also Marc-Antoine Charpentier with Le Reniement de Saint Pierre (H.424). The episode of Peter's denial is conveyed with great poignancy by J.S. Bach in both the St Matthew Passion and the St John Passion. Gardiner 2013, p. 365 says "Inevitably we suffer with Peter; but the uncomfortable question Bach asks us to consider is, would any of us have emerged from his ordeal with greater credit?.l

Denial of Saint Peter in art

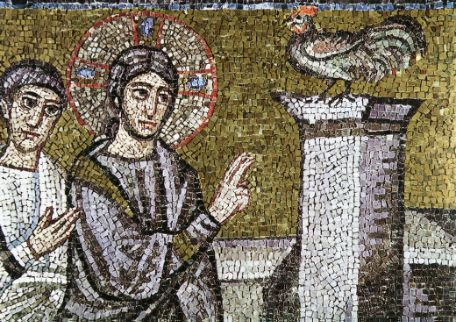
Basilica of Sant'Apollinare Nuovo, 6th century

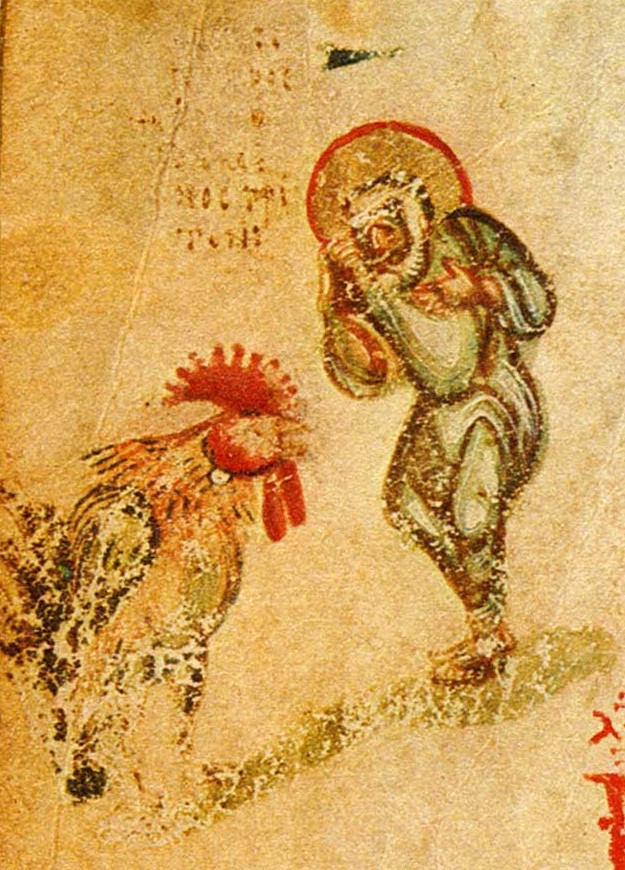
Chludov Psalter, 9th century

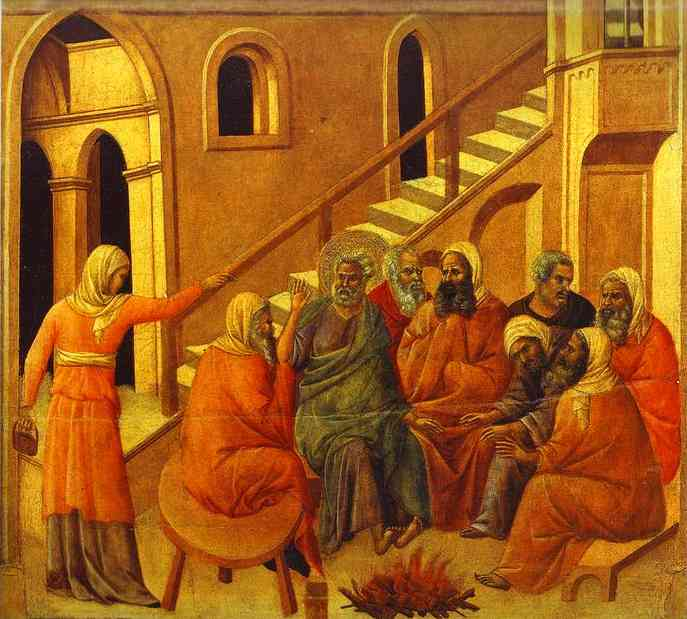
Duccio, 1308–11

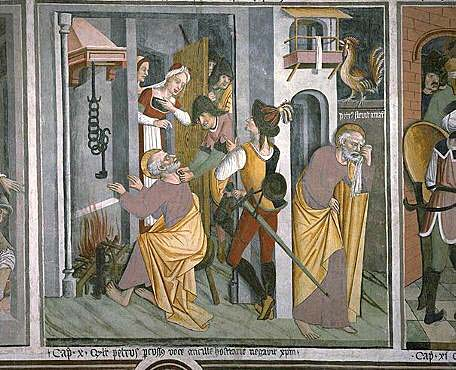
Our Lady of the Fountains (La Brigue), 15th century

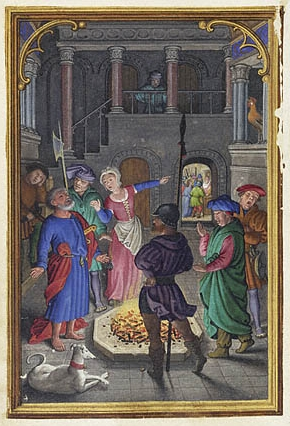
Simon Bening, 1525–30

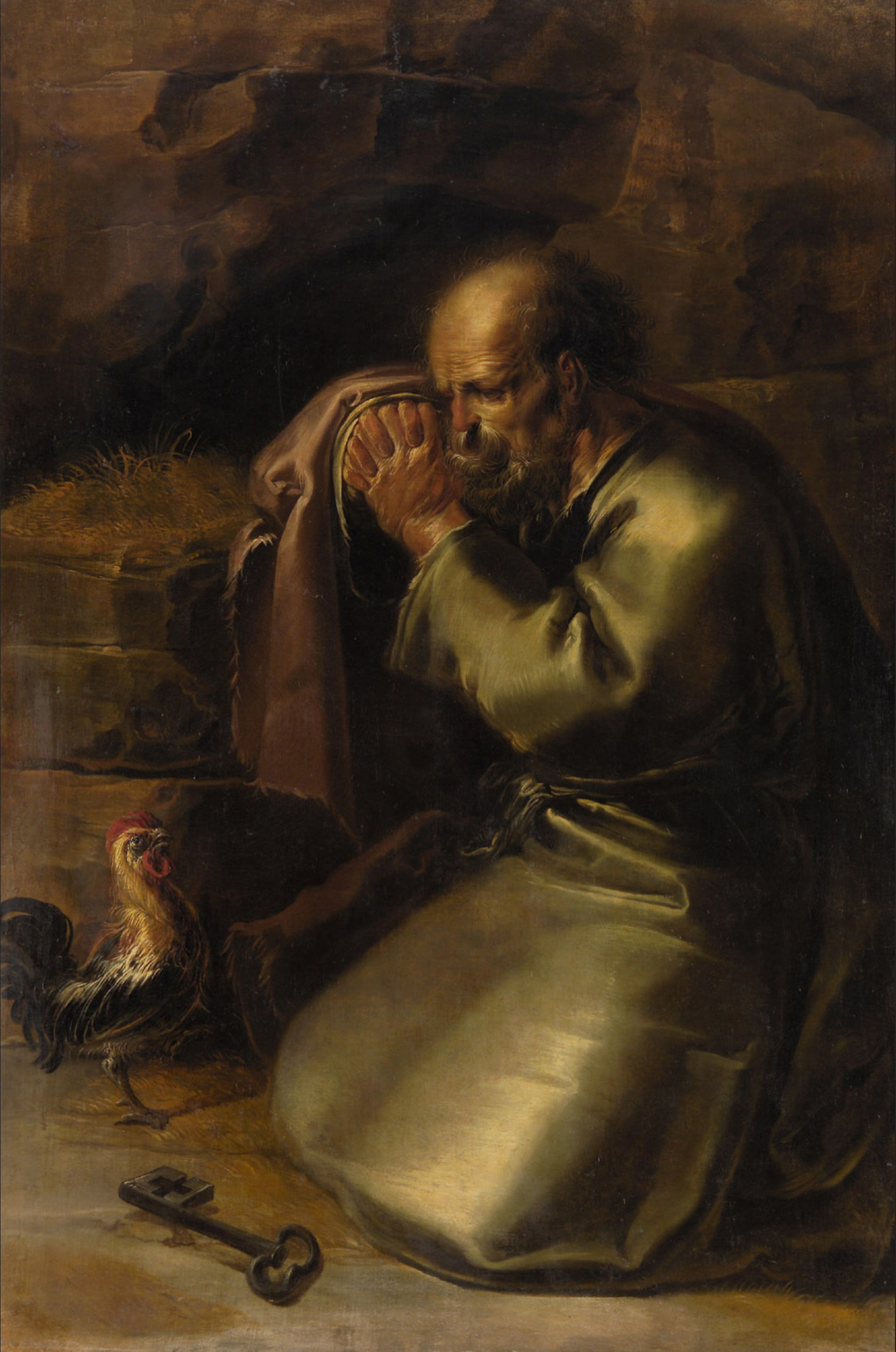
Jan van der Venne : Denial of Saint Peter

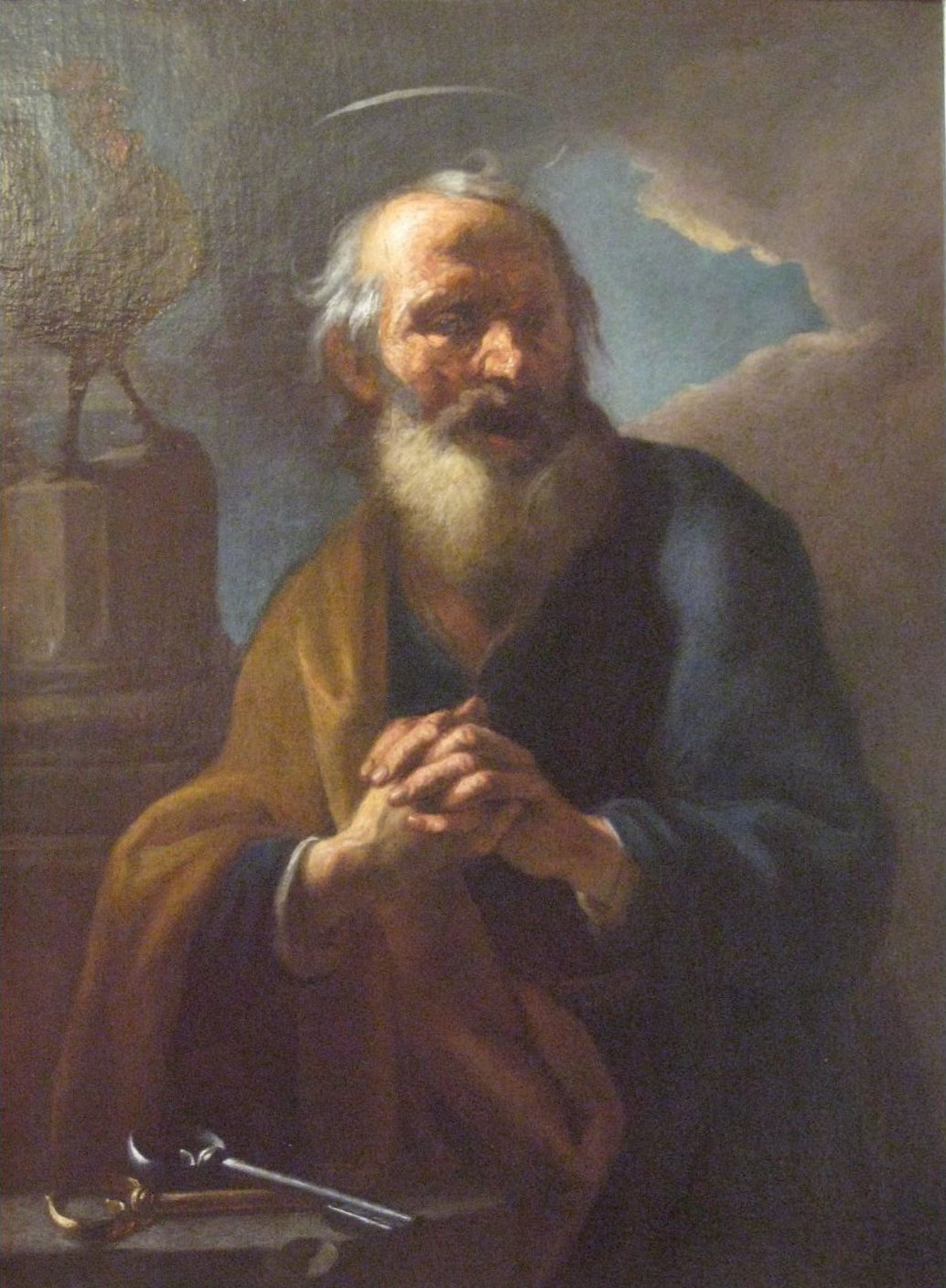
Repentance of Peter, Petr Brandl, 1724

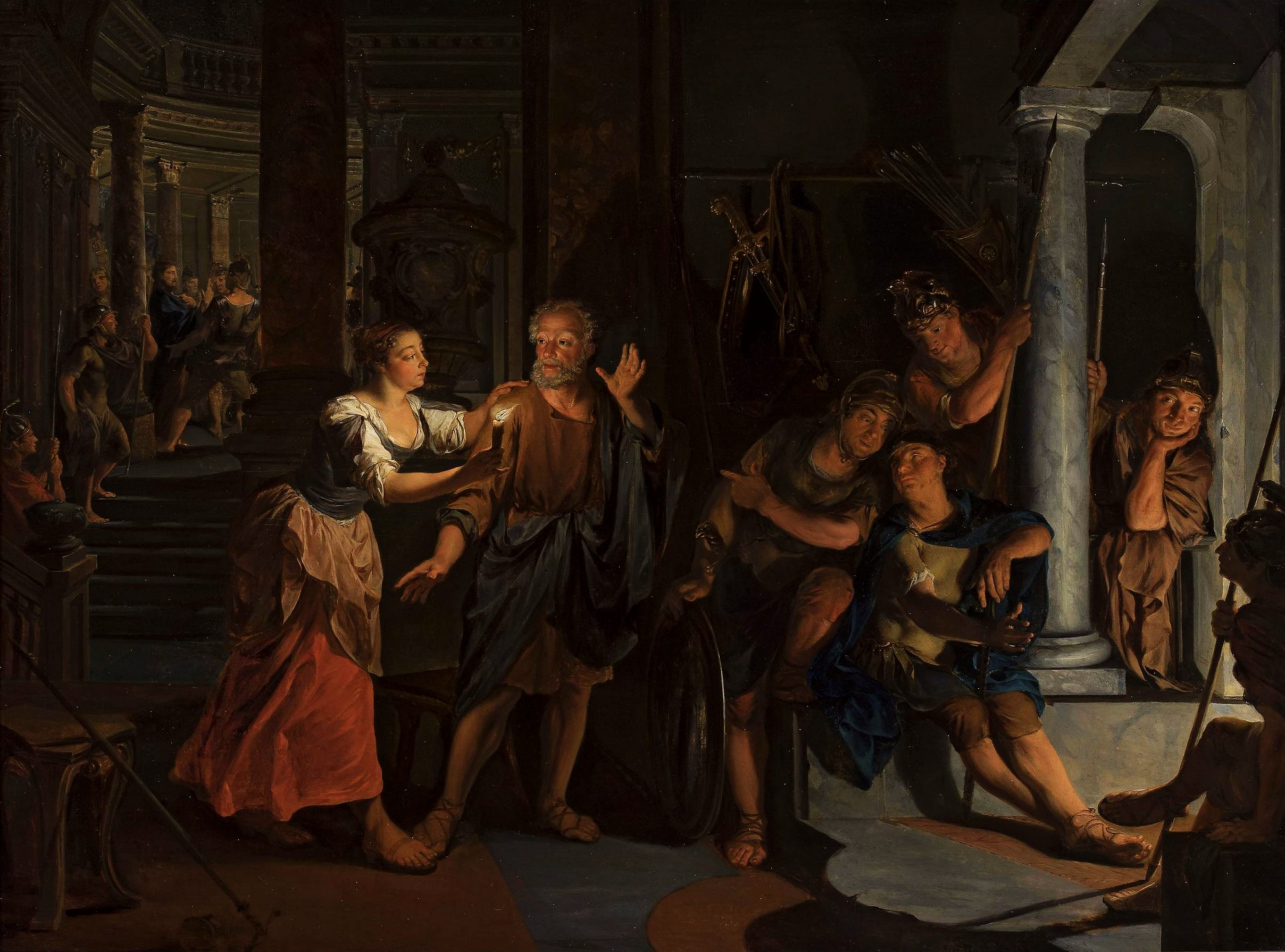
Knüpfer, Denial of Saint Peter

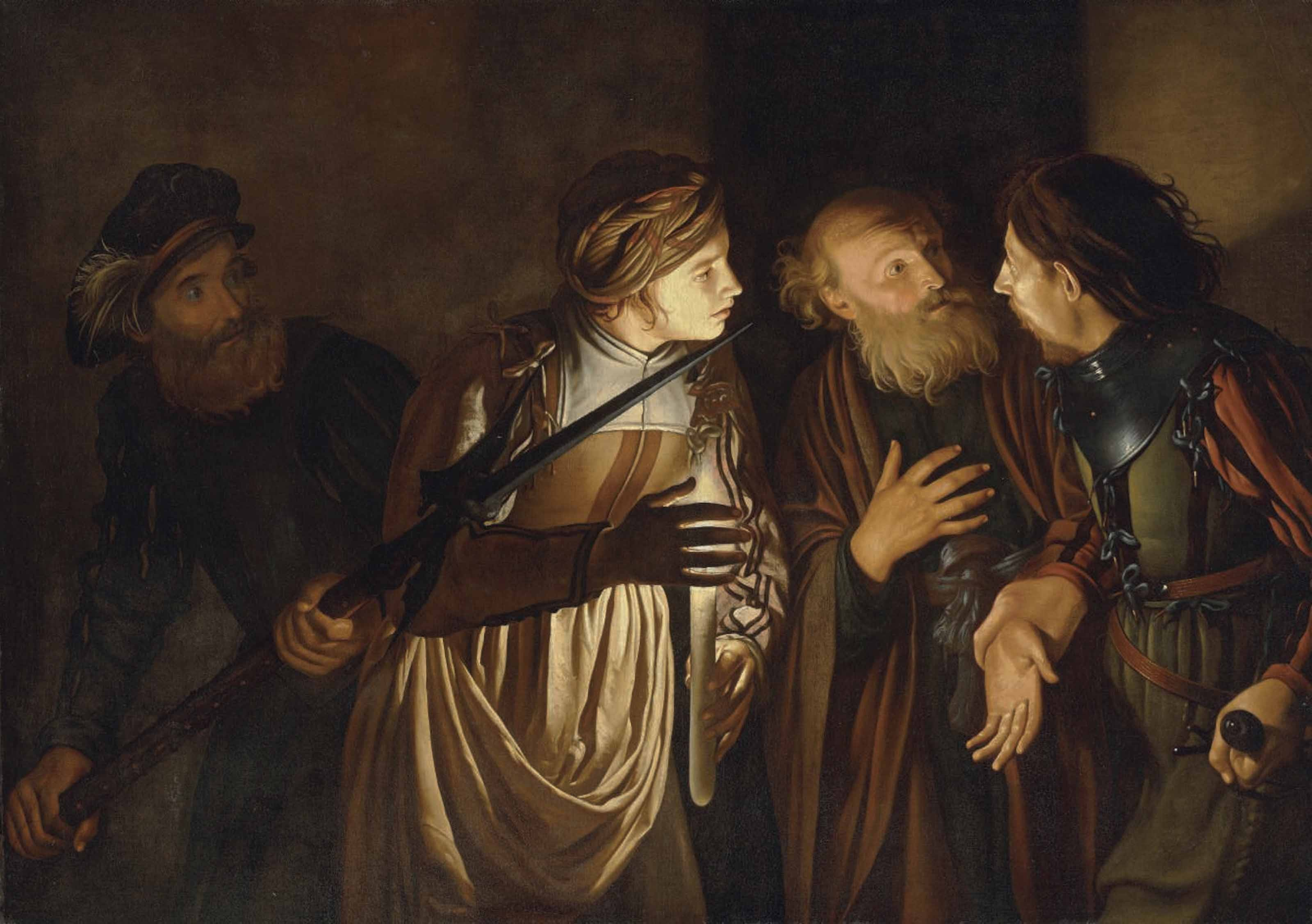
Adam de Coster, The Denial of Saint Peter

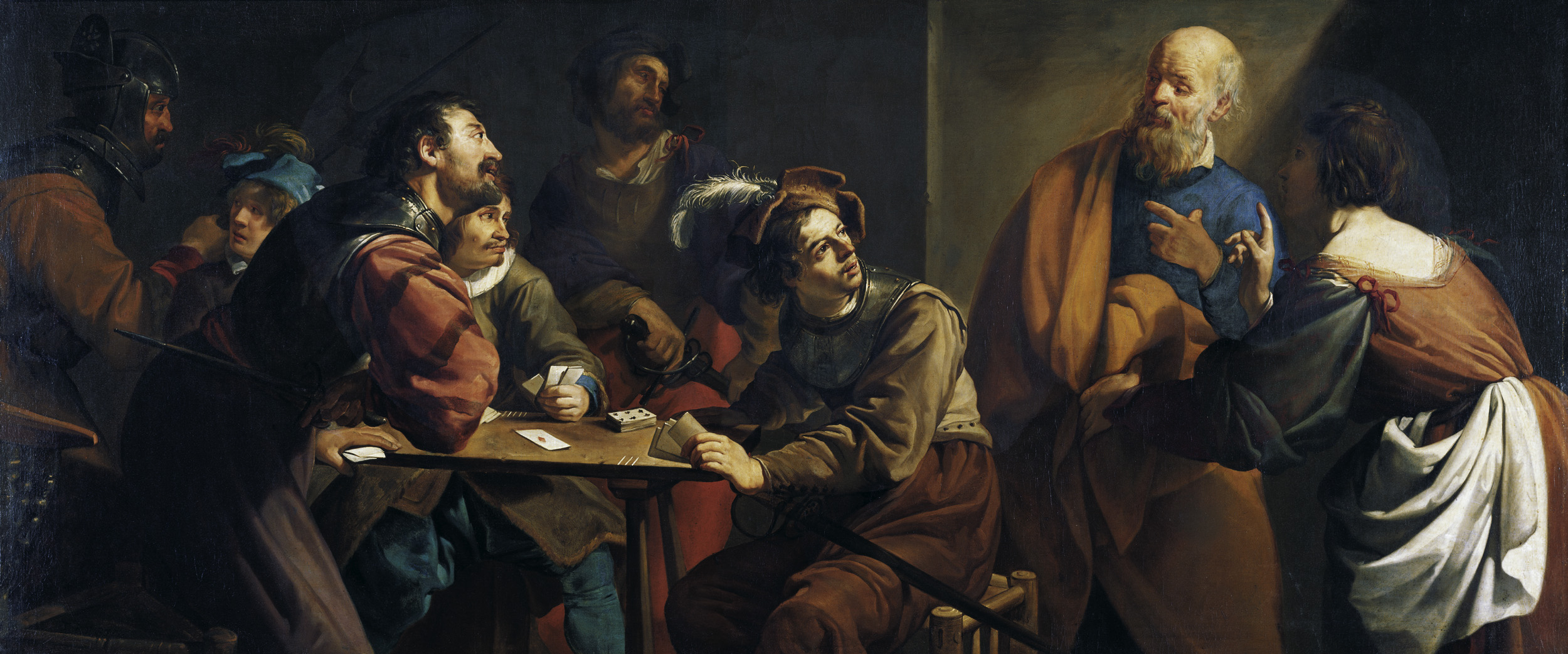
Theodoor Rombouts, The Denial of Saint Peter, 1789

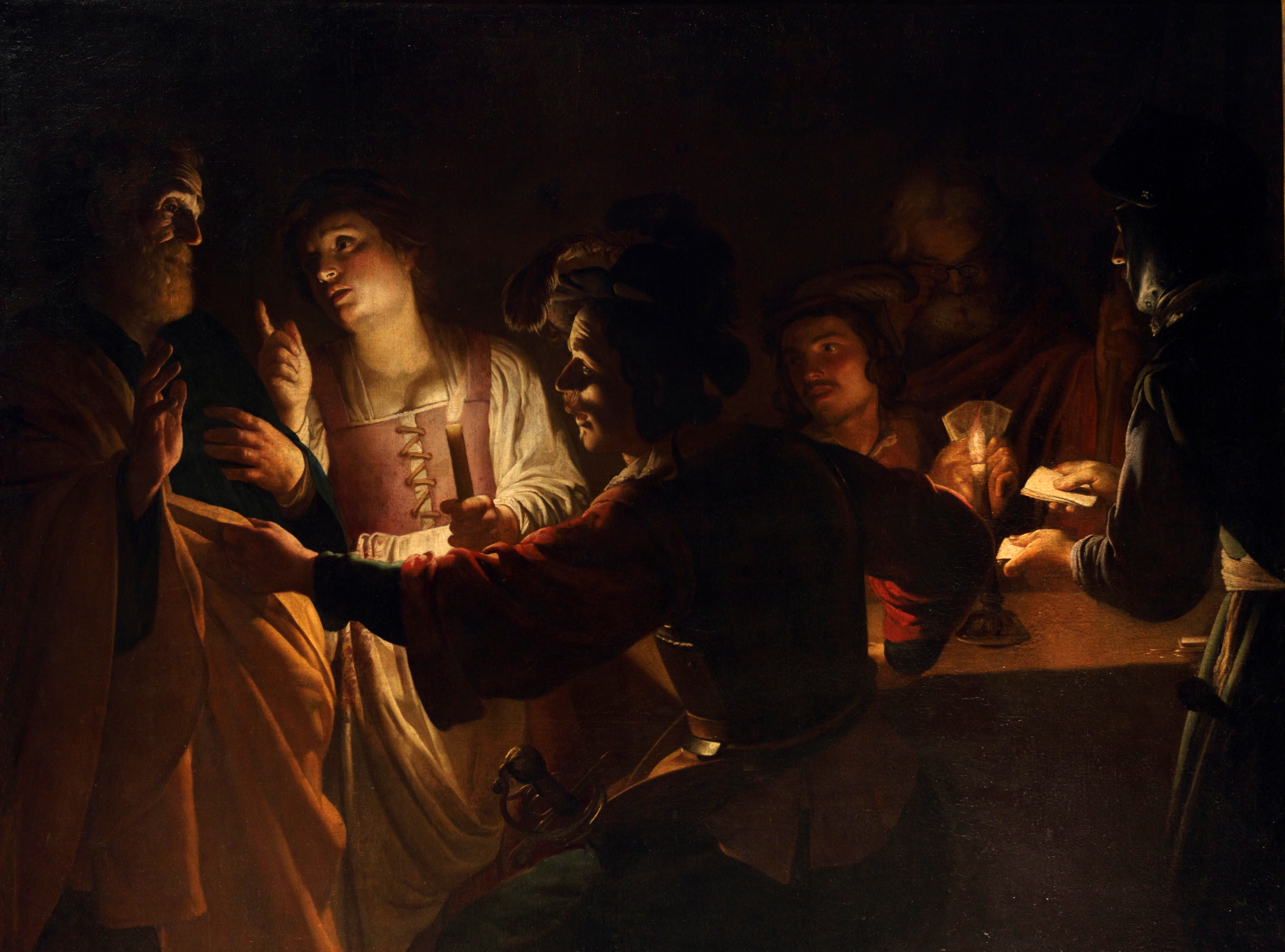
Gerard van Honthorst, The Denial of Saint Peter, c. 1618–20

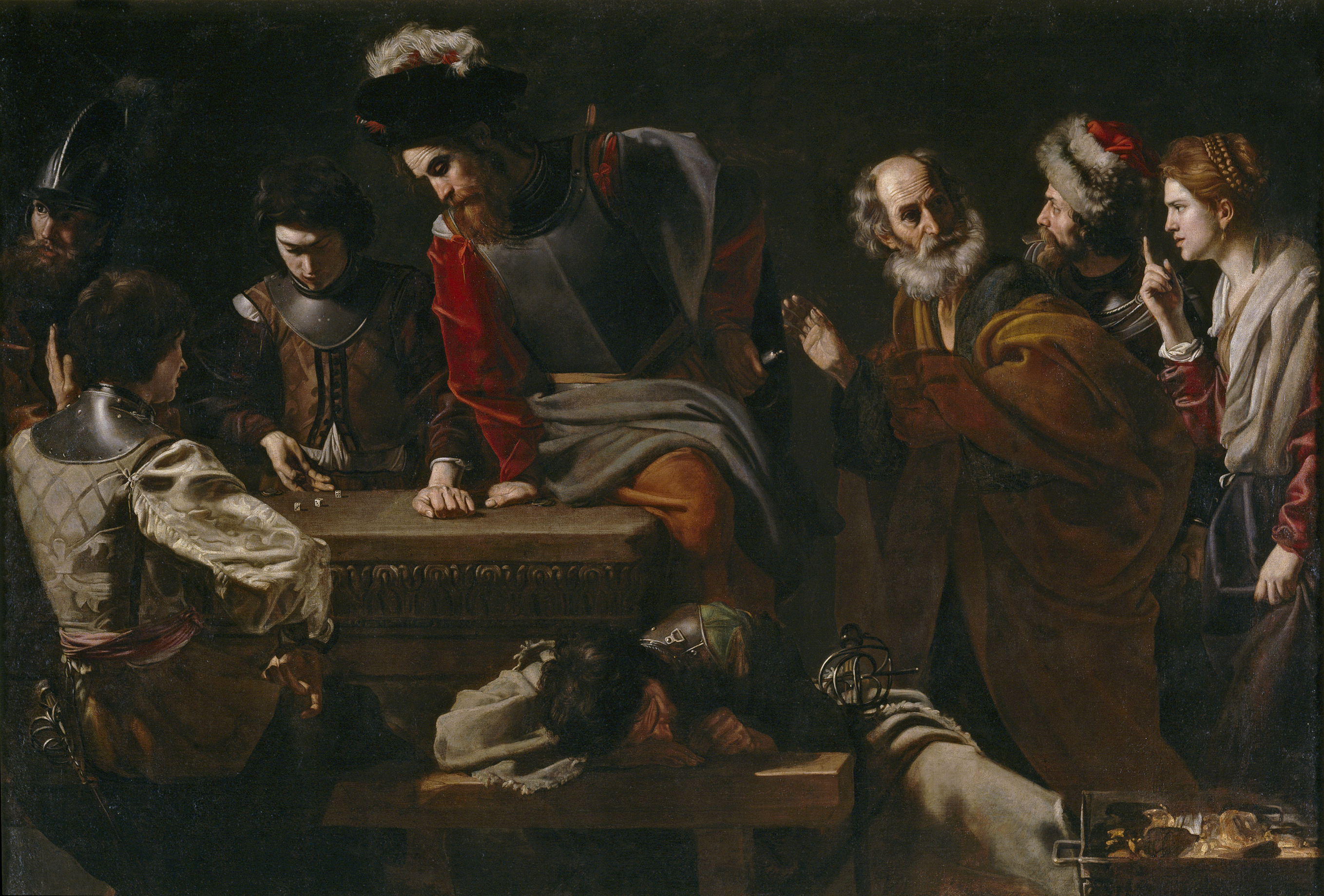
Nicolas Tournier, Denial of St Peter, c. 1625

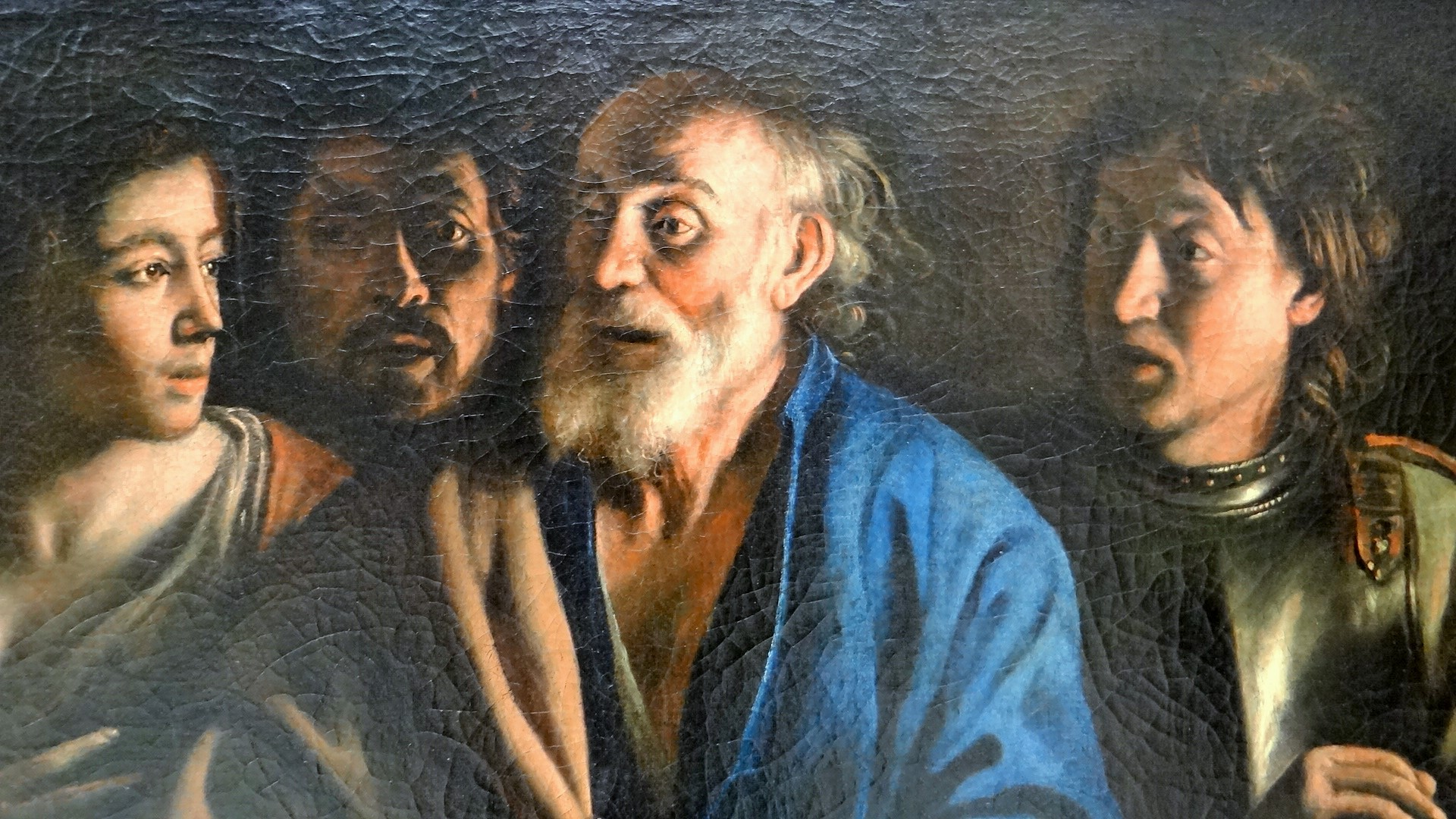
Mathieu Le Nain, The Denial of Saint Peter, c. 1648

== See also ==
- Confession of Peter
- Doubting Thomas
- Gospel harmony
- Jesus predicts his death
- Life of Jesus in the New Testament
