= The Denial of Saint Peter (La Tour) =

1650 painting by Georges de La Tour

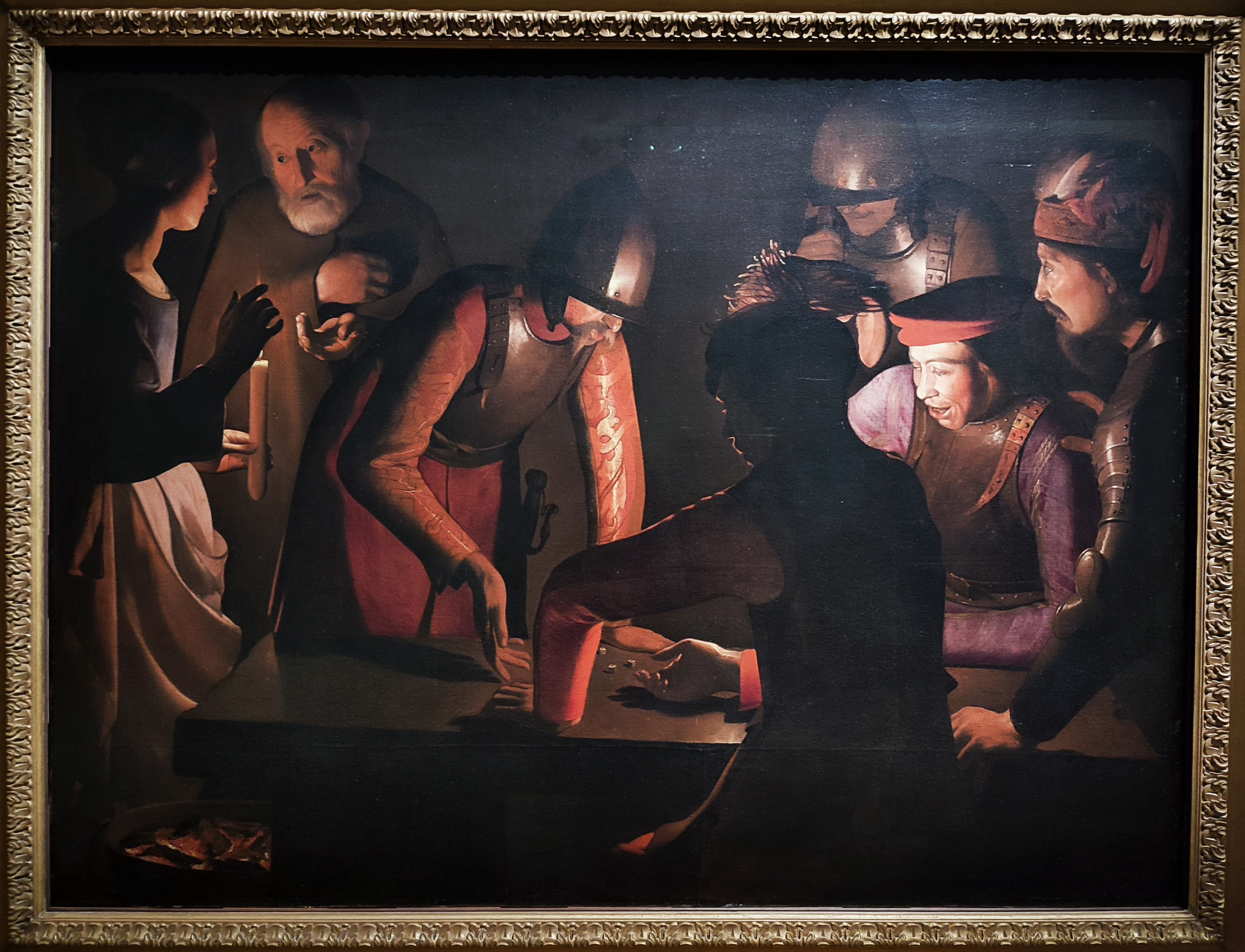

The Denial of Saint Peter is a 1650 painting of the Denial of Peter by Georges de La Tour, possibly with some assistance from the painter's son Étienne. It was signed and dated by the senior artist. In 1810 it was acquired from François Cacault by the musée d'Arts de Nantes, where it still hangs.

The work was commissioned by Henri de La Ferté-Senneterre, governor of Lorraine, where La Tour lived and worked. de La Ferté-Senneterre is recorded as paying 650 francs for a work entitled The Denial of St Peter in 1650, possibly the work now in Nantes. He was then one of the most important collectors of La Tour's work.

The work's approach is very Caravagist, sidelining the work's supposed main subject and placing the soldiers gaming at a table at its centre. In 17th century French society, "gaming was inseparable from luxury" and was evidence of "indifference to salvation" - a similar link is made in the artist's The Card Sharp with the Ace of Diamonds, contemporary with Tristan L'Hermite's The Disgraced Page. The gaming soldiers also refer forwards in time to those casting lots for Jesus' clothing at the foot of the cross.

== Bibliography ==
- Conisbee, Philip (1996). An Introduction to the Life and Art of Georges de La Tour. Washington, DC: National Gallery of Art.
- Judovitz, Dalia (2018). Georges de La Tour and the Enigma of the Visible. New York: Fordham University Press. ISBN 9780823277445.
- Thuillier, Jacques (1992). Georges de La Tour (in French). Paris: Flammarion. ISBN 2-08-010074-2. OCLC 1249895865.
- Thiollet, Catherine (1999). "Variations sur la disgrâce dans "Le Page disgracié"". In Adam, Véronique; Berregard, Sandrine (eds.). Sur Le page disgracié : vingt-quatre études des Cahiers Tristan L'Hermite (in French). Paris: Classiques Garnier. ISBN 978-2-8124-1162-5. OCLC 852662060.
