= Seger =

Seger is a surname. Notable people with the surname include:

- Adolf Seger (1945–2026), German wrestler
- Bob Seger (born 1945), American rock and roll singer-songwriter and musician
- Caroline Seger (born 1985), Swedish footballer
- Francis Seger (1796–1872), American politician
- George N. Seger (1866–1940), American politician
- Gerhart Seger (1896–1967), German politician
- Joe Seger (born 1935), American archaeologist
- John Homer Seger (1846–1928), American educator
- Jon Seger, American evolutionary ecologist
- Josef Seger (1716–1782), Czech organist, composer, and educator
- Linda Seger (born 1945), American author and screenwriting consultant
- Daniel Seger (born 1977), Liechtenstein politician
- Mathias Seger (born 1977), Swiss ice hockey player
- Shea Seger (born 1979), American singer-songwriter

== Characters ==
- Clara Seger, a fictional character on the CBS crime drama Criminal Minds: Beyond Borders, portrayed by Alana de la Garza

== See also ==
- Seger Ellis (1904–1995), American jazz pianist and vocalist

Related surnames:

- Seeger
- Seager
- Seghers
- Segers
- Segger
