= The Denial of Saint Peter (Caravaggio) =

Painting by Caravaggio

- De verloochening van Christus door Petrus (Dutch); La Negazione di Pietro (Italian); Le reniement de saint Pierre (French)
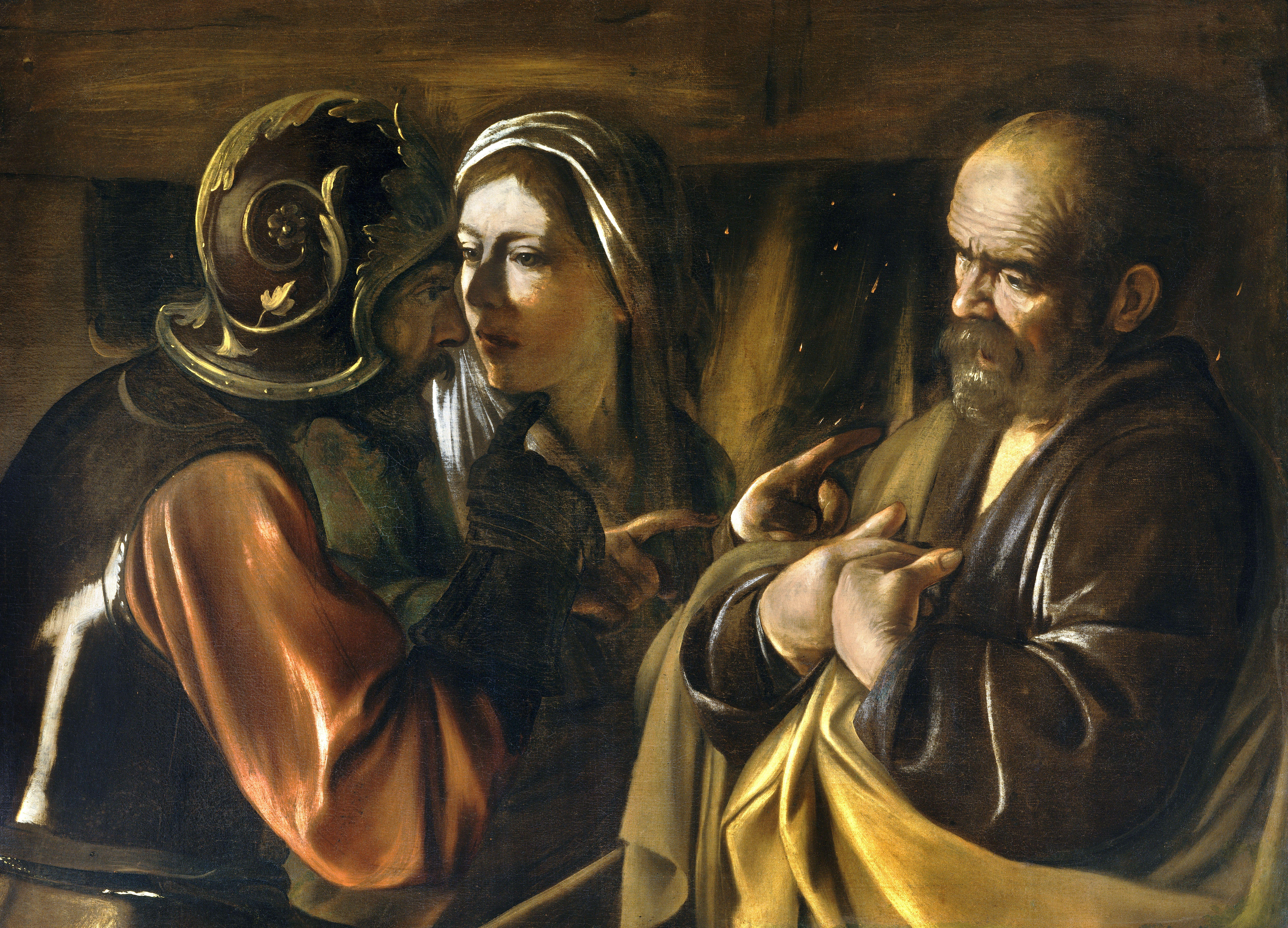
- The Denial of Saint Peter by Caravaggio
- Artist: Caravaggio
- Year: 1610
- Medium: Oil on canvas
- Dimensions: 94 cm × 125.4 cm (37 in × 49.4 in)
- Location: Metropolitan Museum of Art; New York
- Accession: 1997.167
- Website: www.metmuseum.org/collections/search-the-collections/110002441

The Denial of Saint Peter (La Negazione di Pietro) is a painting finished around 1610 by the Italian Baroque painter Caravaggio. It depicts Peter denying Jesus after Jesus was arrested. The painting is housed in the Metropolitan Museum of Art in New York City.

== Provenance ==
The Denial of Saint Peter is generally thought to be one of the last two works by Caravaggio, the other being The Martyrdom of Saint Ursula. It was probably finished at Naples in the summer of 1610. This dating is made on stylistic and compositional grounds, especially by comparison to the Saint Ursula.

In 1612, the painter Guido Reni left Rome for his native Bologna and on 9 March 1612 gave instructions to the engraver Luca Ciamberlano to collect the remainder of his fees from Reverenda Camera Apostolica for the frescos he had painted in the Borghese Chapel in the Basilica di Santa Maria Maggiore. Ciamberlano again acted on his behalf on 12 September 1612 in the collection of some other debts. The combined sum owed to Reni amounted to 350 scudi. It seems that Ciamberlano was late in the forwarding of this money, for on 3 May 1613 Reni appointed Alessandro Albini to collect. Summoned before the notary Simon Petrus Corallus, Ciamberlano offered "a painting by the hand of the late master Michelangelo da Caravaggio, which they say portrays the denial of St Peter with a maid." It was valued highly at 240 scudi and accepted by Albini in payment. The balance, 110 scudi, was paid over the next seven years.

A number of artists active in Rome about this time must have known of the painting. Its influence is to be seen in a work by José de Ribera, now in the Galleria Corsini, Rome, dated to ca. 1613–15. Lionello Spada also completed at least two autograph works based on the painting, one in a private collection, the other in the Galleria Nazionale, Parma. Spada returned to Bologna from Rome and Malta in 1614.

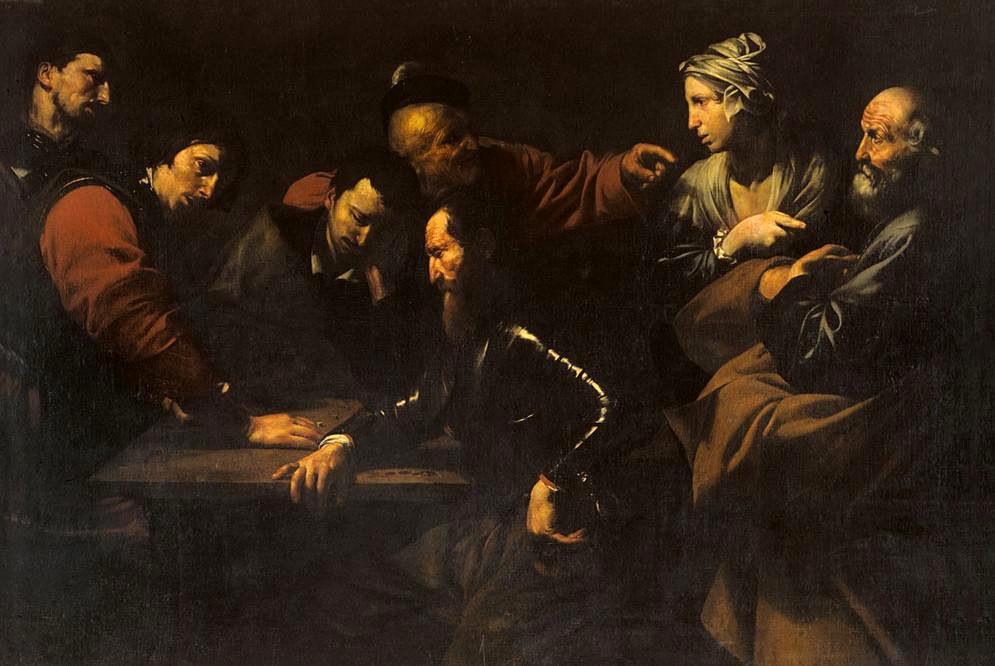
Denial of Saint Peter by José de Ribera, oil on canvas, 163 x 233 cm, Galleria Corsini, Rome

Reni must have disposed of the painting some time within the next decade since it appears in Cardinal Paolo Savelli's inventory taken at the Ariccia palace in 1624. Savelli was a patron of Orazio Gentileschi, a contemporary of Caravaggio in Rome, of whom he owned at least twelve paintings.

The cardinal died in 1632, leaving it to his brother, Federico Savelli (died 1649), who in his turn left it to his nephew Cardinal Fabrizio Savelli. In 1650 the Savelli collection was offered for sale to the Duke of Modena and the picture must have been sold soon thereafter.

In 1798, Matthew Pilkington noted a painting in the Certosa di San Martino in Naples "by Caravaggio, representing the Denial of St. Peter, with figures at half-length and as large as life". A document of 28 September 1655 states it was sold to the Certosa by architect Cosimo Fanzago and was hung above the door to the sacristy. Bernardo de' Dominici described this painting in the third volume of his Vite dei Pittori, Scultori, ed Architetti Napolitani (1742) as "a miracle of art, executed with such power of truth that it triumphs over whatever work is near it". Battistello Caracciolo had made a copy of this painting, now lost. It is not known whether this painting is the same as the present; some time after Bernardo de' Dominici remarked on it, it was removed and presumably sold. Giovanni Pietro Bellori (1672) wrote "it depicts the serving maid pointing to Peter, who turns with open hands in the act of denying Christ; and it is painted in nocturnal light with other figures warming themselves at a fire". Thus there appears to be a second version of Caravaggio's Denial of St Peter unaccounted for.

Shortly after the Second World War the present painting was purchased by Vincenzo Imparato Caracciolo of Naples on the Neapolitan art market as an anonymous work from an antiques dealer. After its restoration in 1959–1964, it came to be attributed to Caravaggio, on the basis of style, by Roberto Longhi.

It was owned by his daughter principessa Elena Imparato Caracciolo, Naples until between 1964 and 1970, when it was sold to Jan Dik of Lausanne, Switzerland. Dik sold it to Herman Shickman of New York, from whose collection it was sold to the Metropolitan Museum of Art in 1997.

== Theme and composition ==
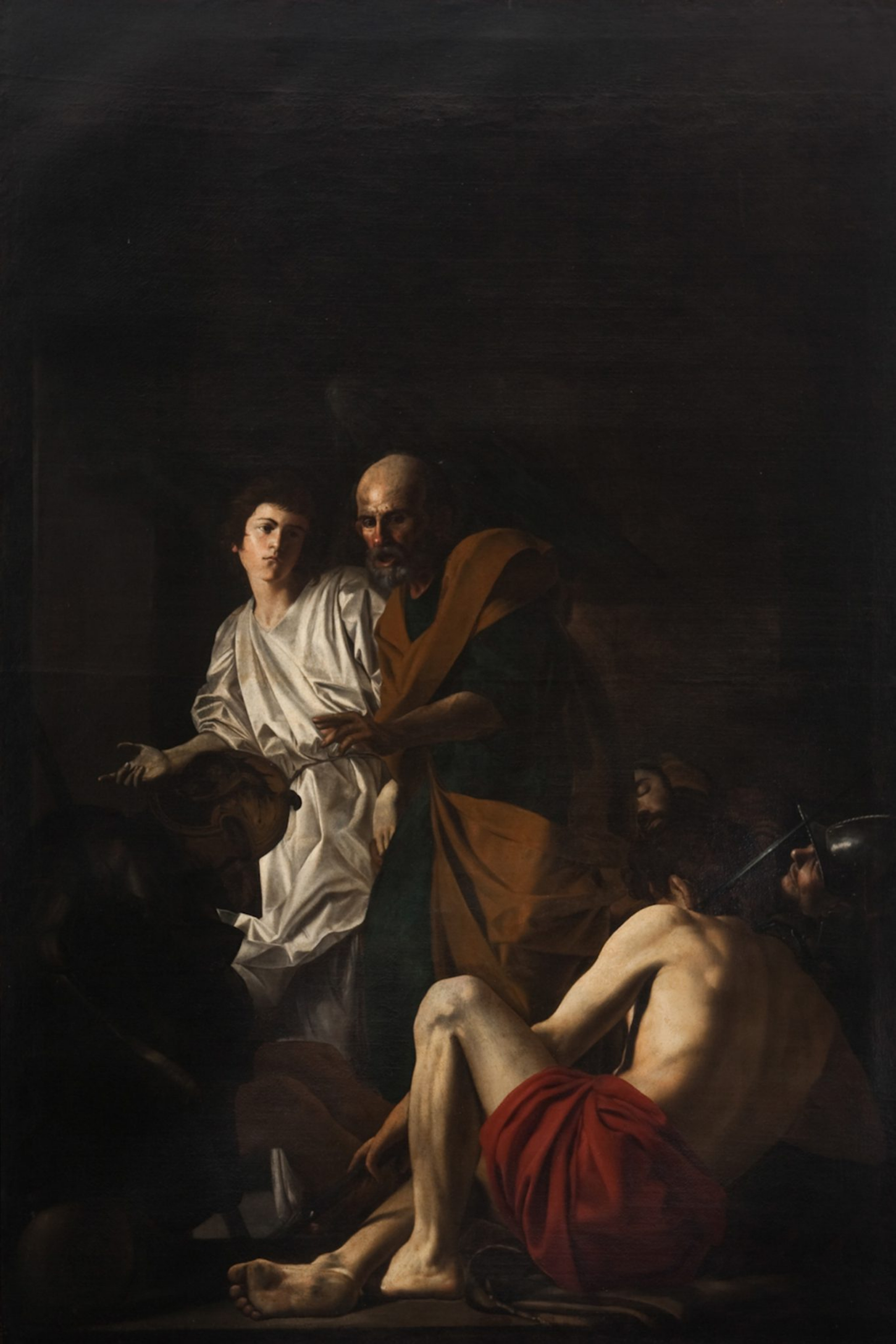
Battistello Caracciolo, The Liberation of St Peter, oil on canvas, Church of the Pio Monte della Misericordia (Naples)

According to the account in the Gospels (Matthew 26:69–75; Mark 14:66–72; Luke 22:55–62; John 18:17–18, 25–27), when Christ was arrested Peter followed him into the courtyard "to Annas, who was the father-in-law of Caiaphas, the high priest that year" (following John 18:13). There he was accused at three separate confrontations of being a disciple of Jesus. Peter denied each and thus fulfilled Christ's prophecy that before the cock crowed he would deny him thrice.

In October 1609, Caravaggio was attacked by assailants at the Osteria del Cerriglio tavern in Naples, led by Giovanni Rodomonte Roero, the Conte della Vezza. It seems he never fully recovered from the attack and this is evidenced by broad brushwork and an unfocused quality to the work. The style of the picture is similar to the Martyrdom of Saint Ursula (Banca di Napoli), with which it must be more or less contemporary. Caravaggio crops the figures closely and smothers large areas in shadow in order to avoid any awkward depictions of human physicality. His paintings also represented a psychological intensity which was common in his later work. A similar helmet was used by Battistello Caracciolo in his Liberation of Saint Peter (1615) in the Pio Monte della Misericordia, Naples.

== In popular culture ==
Appearing ominously in a 2014 episode of The Walking Dead, the painting is in Grady Hospital after being recovered outside of the High Museum in apocalyptic Atlanta. It is unclear whether the writers of The Walking Dead TV series were mistaken or on purpose used Caravaggio's "The Denial of Saint Peter". Since 1997, Caravaggio's painting has been a permanent part of The Metropolitan Museum of Art in New York City. The High Museum of Art in Atlanta does have a painting named "The Denial of Saint Peter", but that painting is by the French artist Nicolas Tournier and was painted in 1630 and thus 20 years later than Caravaggio's painting. Nicolas Tournier was heavily influenced by Caravaggio's painting of the same name.

== See also ==
- List of paintings by Caravaggio
