= Gerard Seghers =

Flemish painter

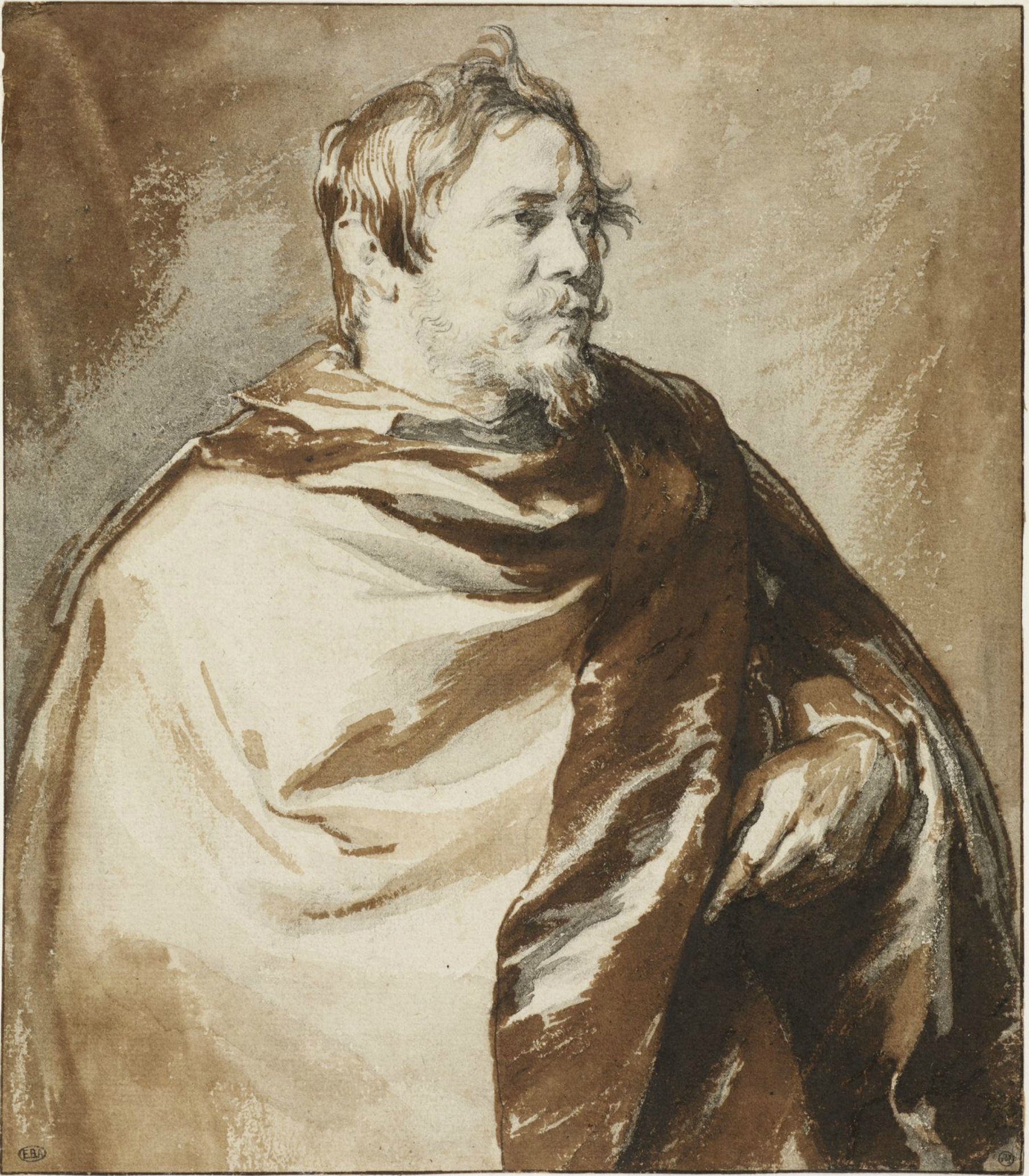
Portrait of Gerard Seghers drawing by Anthony van Dyck

Gerard Seghers (c. 17 March 1591 – 18 March 1651) was a Flemish painter, art collector, and art dealer. After a period of study and residence in Italy, he returned to Flanders where he became one of the leading representatives of the Flemish Caravaggisti movement . In his later career he abandoned the Caravaggist style and genre motifs to become an important painter of large altarpieces for local churches.

== Life ==
Gerard Seghers was born in Antwerp, where he was baptized on 17 March 1591. He was the son of innkeeper Jan Seghers and his wife Ida de Neve. He was probably unrelated to the Jesuit still life painter Daniel Seghers. At the age of 12 he was enrolled as a pupil at the Guild of Saint Luke in Antwerp. It is not clear who his teacher was. Possibly he trained under Abraham Janssens, Hendrick van Balen or Caspar de Crayer (the father of the more famous Gaspar de Crayer).

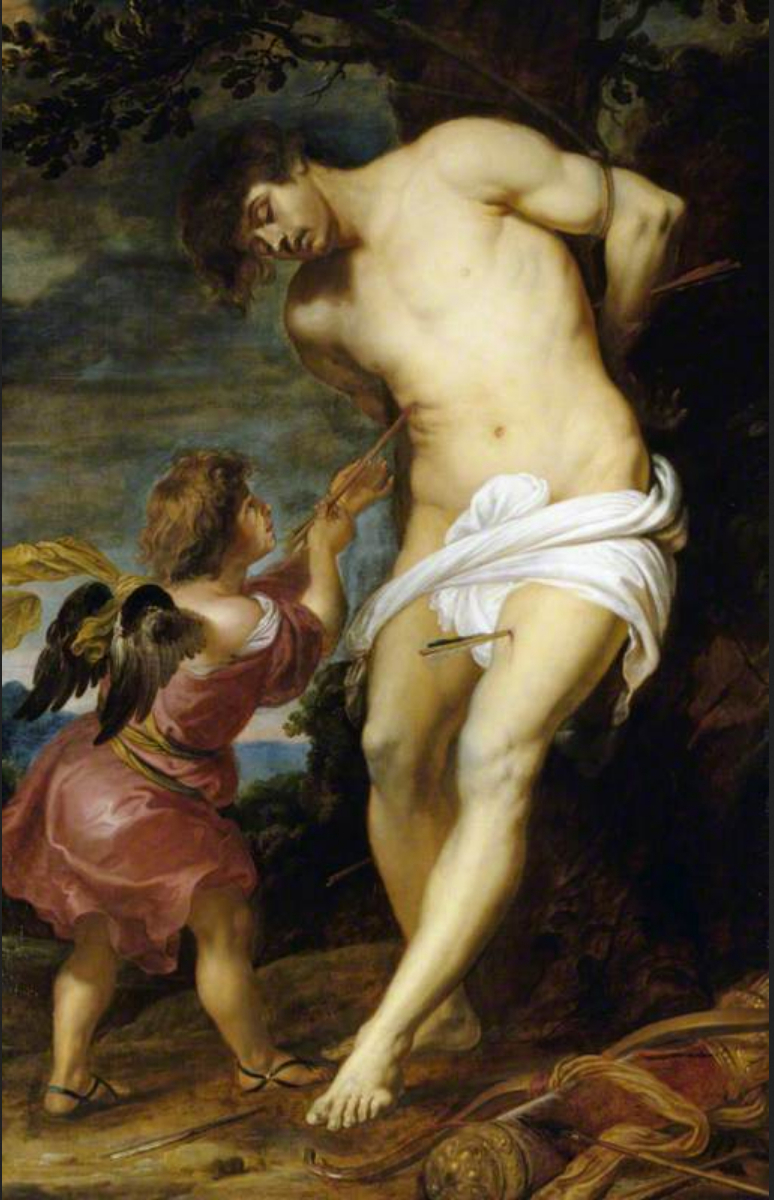
Saint Sebastian comforted by an angel

In 1608, aged only 17, he became a master in the Antwerp Guild of Saint Luke. In 1611 Seghers joined the Sodaliteit der Bejaarde Jongmans (Society of Bachelors of Age), a fraternity for bachelors established by the Jesuit order. The Society's membership consisted principally of citizens from the elite and wealthy middle classes including artists and merchants. Through their membership of the Society, artists were able to access an important network of contacts which could benefit their careers.

He travelled to Italy where around 1611 he was in Naples working for the Spanish viceroy Pedro Fernández de Castro, Count of Lemos. He later moved to Rome where he worked for Cardinal Antonio Zapata y Cisneros and the Spanish ambassador. In Rome he encountered the followers of Caravaggio, who had himself died a few years before Seghers's arrival in Rome. One in particular, Bartolomeo Manfredi, had a significant impact on his early work. Manfredi was one of the closest followers of Caravaggio and was at the height of his fame when Seghers arrived in Rome. Seghers fell strongly under the spell of Manfredi's work. He likely also met the Dutch and Flemish Caravaggisti residing in Rome such as Gerard van Honthorst, Dirck van Baburen, and Jan Janssens, and possibly also Hendrik ter Brugghen and Theodoor Rombouts. He is believed to have worked on commissions for, and sent his works, to the Antwerp art merchants Goetkint. Seghers further used his stay in Italy to continue his training as a painter and make copies after famous Italian paintings.

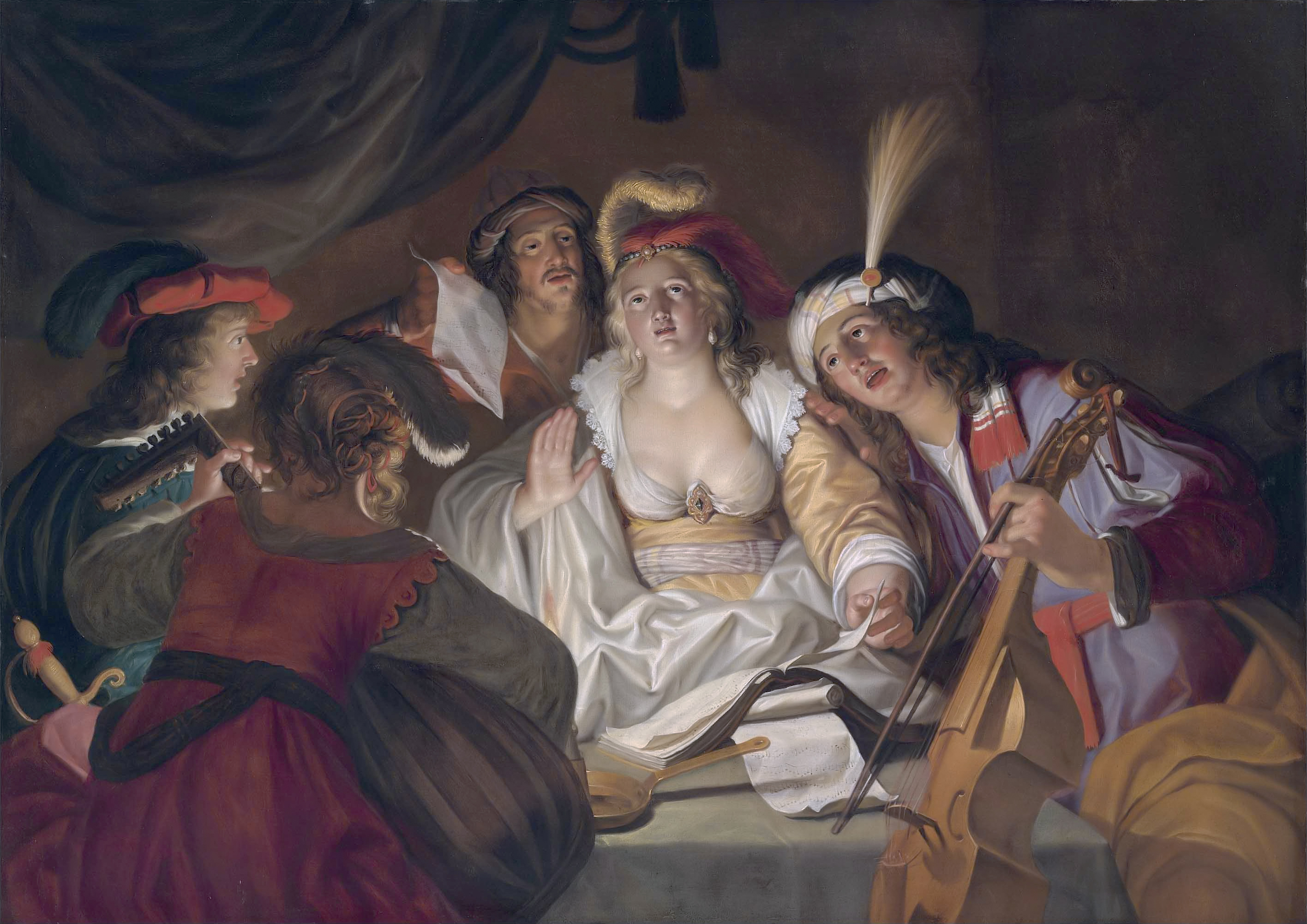
A musical company

Cardinal Cisneros convinced Seghers to go to Madrid. He traveled there in 1616 with the Italian painters Bartolomeo Cavarozzi and Giovanni Battista Crescenzi. He reported later that at the time he was in the service of King Philip III of Spain. The lack of mention of the artist in contemporary Spanish sources casts some doubt on this alleged sojourn in Spain. He was back in Antwerp in the fall of 1620 and the following year he assisted Rubens in the decoration of the Saint Carolus Borromeus church of Antwerp. In 1621 Seghers married Catharina Wouters (d.1656) who came from a respected family. The couple would have eleven children of whom one, Jan Baptist (1624–1670), also became a painter. Their daughter Constantia (1632–?) became an art dealer and was registered as such in the Antwerp Guild of Saint Luke.

In 1624 he became a consultor of the Sodality of the Married Men of Age ('Sodaliteit der getrouwden'), a fraternity of married men established by the Jesuit order. It is assumed that in the period 1624 to 1627 he visited or resided in Utrecht where he would have met the leading Carravagist Gerard van Honthorst whom he likely knew from Rome.

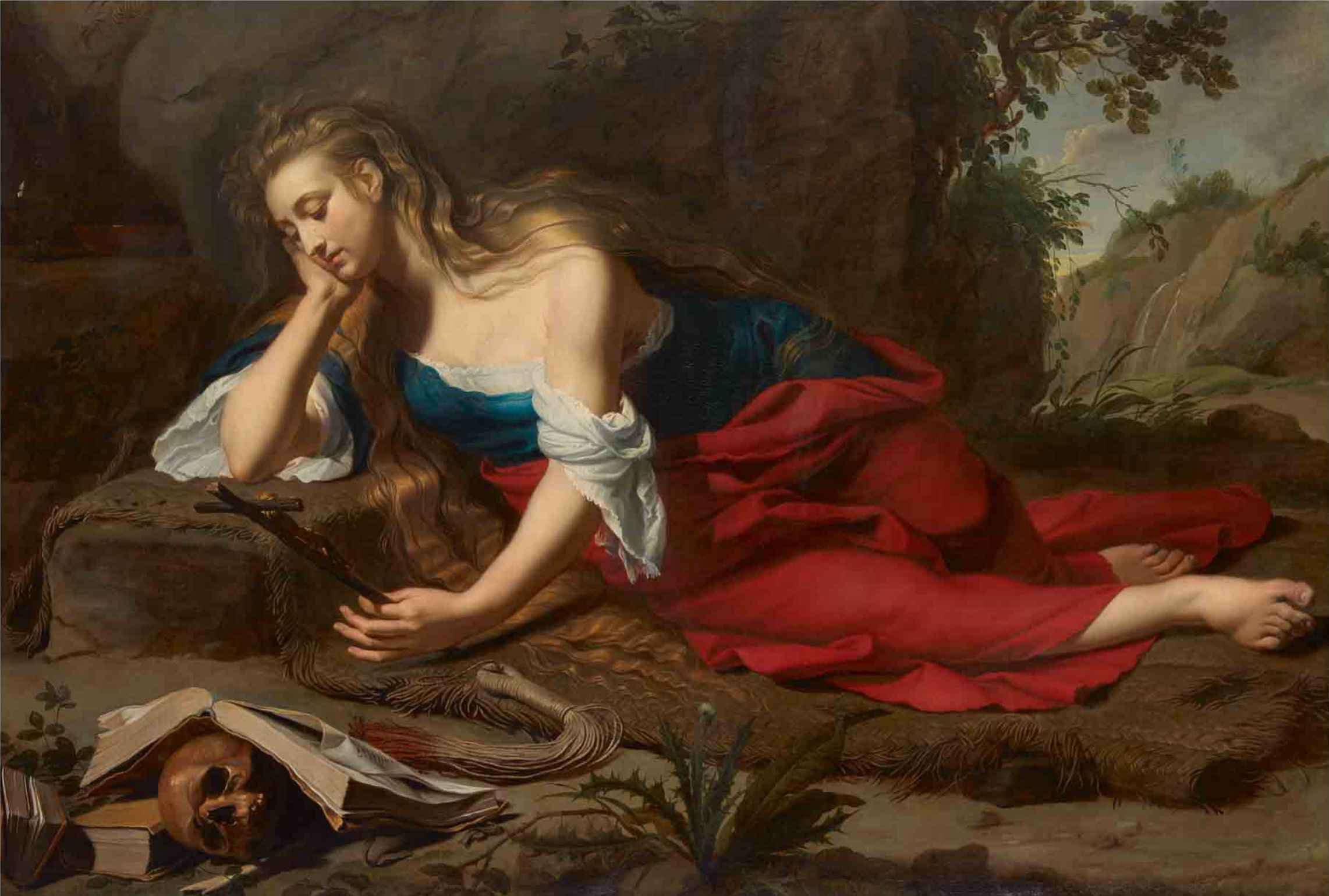
Repentant Mary Magdalene, c. 1627–1630

In Antwerp Seghers was successful as a painter and art dealer and was able to afford a house on the fashionable Meir. He was patronized by many monastic orders, including the Jesuits, who commissioned altarpieces from him. He was employed by the city authorities of both Antwerp and Ghent as one of the many artists working on the festive decorations for the Joyous Entry of Cardinal-Infante Ferdinand, the new governor of the Spanish Netherlands, in 1635. Seghers's contribution to the Ghent decorations was based on a design by Rubens and was later engraved by Jacob Neefs with the title Belgica implores Charles V to let Ferdinand rule the country and published by Jan van Meurs in Antwerp in a publication on the Joyous Entry into Ghent. Seghers was appointed court painter to the Cardinal-Infante on 25 June 1637. It is possible that in the 1640s he spent some time in Amsterdam. Seghers's work found an eager market abroad, in particular in Spain, thanks to the strong political links between Spain and Flanders as well as Seghers's personal connections with important Spanish personalities such as Cardinal Cisneros.

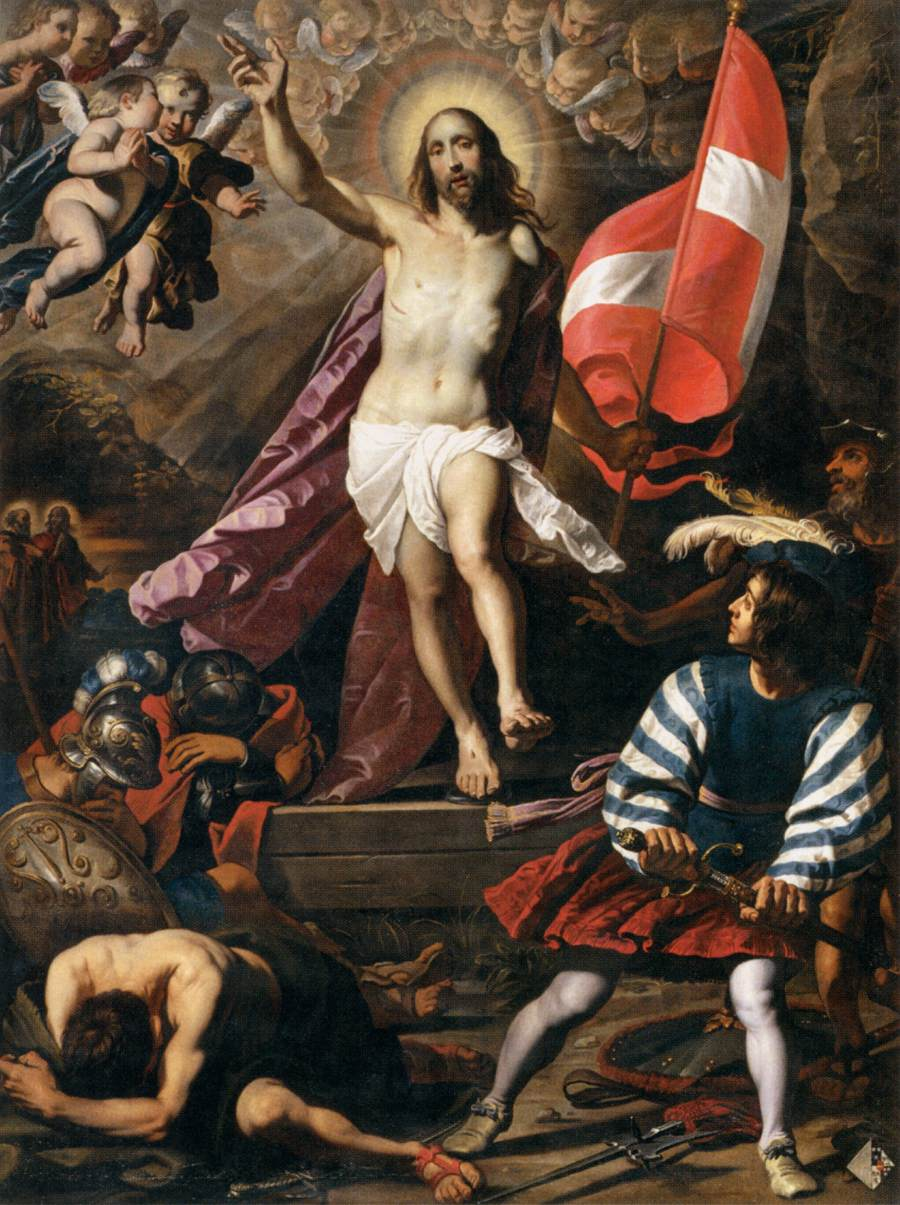
The resurrection

Seghers served as the dean of the Antwerp Guild of St. Luke in 1645. Seghers was a member of the chamber of rhetoric called Violieren since his return to Antwerp in 1620. He further joined the Guild of Romanists. The Guild of Romanists was a society of notables and artists which was active in Antwerp from the 16th to 18th century. It was a condition of membership that the member had visited Rome. In the year 1637 the Guild of Romanists chose Seghers as its dean. By the time he died in Antwerp in 1651, Seghers was a wealthy man who owned a comfortable house and an extensive art collection.

He had many pupils including his son Jan Baptist, Peter Franchoys, Frans Lucas Peters (I), Pieter Verbeeck (II), and Thomas Willeboirts Bosschaert.

== Work ==
Seghers is known mainly for his monumental genre paintings and large religious and allegorical works. He completed many altarpieces for churches in the Southern Netherlands. Most of his works are executed in a characteristic landscape (horizontal) format.

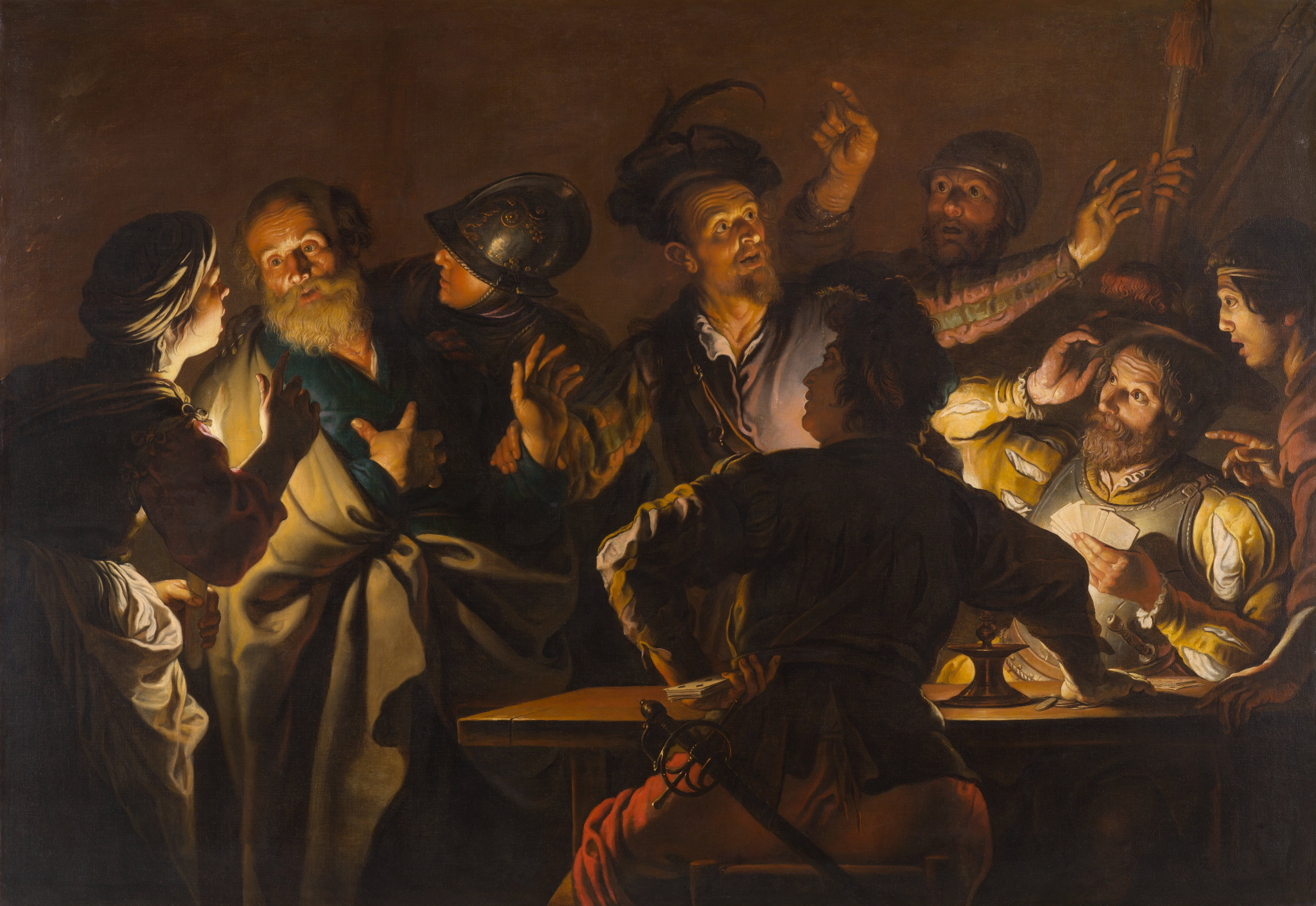
The denial of Saint Peter

Stylistically and thematically, Seghers was initially strongly influenced by Caravaggio and in particular the work of Bartolomeo Manfredi, a follower of Caravaggio, who championed an idealised form of Caravaggism. Caravaggism, both in history and monumental genre paintings, continued to mark Seghers's work after his return to Antwerp. In contrast to Caravaggio, Seghers preferred a more idealised treatment of his subjects. The influence of the Caravaggisti is seen in his reliance on chiaroscuro, close-ups and an exaggerated expression for dramatic effect. He often used figures to obscure the light source (often candlelight) for dramatic effect. A work from this early period is his Judith with the Head of Holofernes in the Galleria Nazionale d'Arte Antica, Rome as well as The Denial of Saint Peter in the North Carolina Museum of Art. Favourite themes were scenes of music making and card playing.

The theme of the Denial of Saint Peter seems to have been particularly dear to him as at least 10 versions by his hand are known. The theme lent itself easily to genre treatment. Seghers was mainly interested in depicting people of flesh and blood, preferably in a moment of crisis which allowed the artist to paint their various facial expressions. The masked candle he used heightened the expressiveness and added a spiritual dimension. Many copies of his versions of this theme were produced by himself and his studio. The Flemish painter Michael Angelo Immenraet repeated one of Seghers's variation on the theme in his programme of decorative paintings on biblical themes he painted for the Unionskirche, Idstein in Germany.

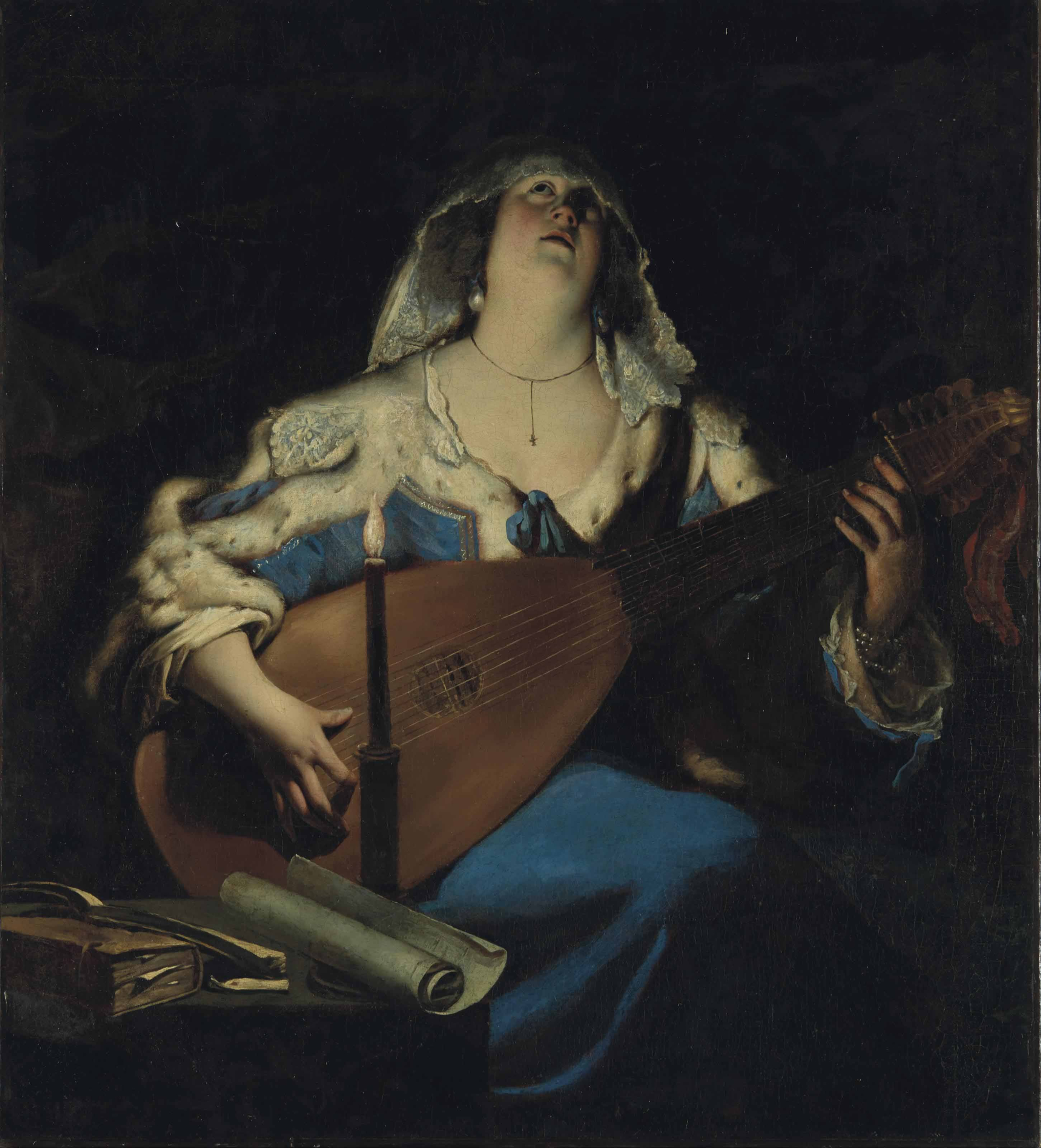
Lute player

After 1630, his palette lightened up considerably and the dark background was replaced by architectural motifs, clouds and landscape elements. The realistic facial expressions became more Classicist and he used more variations of colour. These changes reflected the influence of Peter Paul Rubens with whom Seghers closely collaborated during the 1630s. This influence went even so far that in his painting the Adoration of the Magi (1630, Church of Our Lady, Bruges) he adopted Rubens's composition for his treatment of the same subject. It is with this style that he achieved his greatest success in his career. His most important and most characteristic works were painted between 1630 and 1640. Afterwards, he changed to a more gracious and elegant, but also less monumental style. His colours became weaker and the draperies more linear.

While Seghers typically worked on a large scale, he also produced various works on a small scale and on copper for the export market or private use. These smaller works were often reduced copies or variations of his own works. Many of Seghers's compositions were engraved by Antwerp engravers such as Jacob Neefs, Paulus Pontius and Schelte a Bolswert. These prints have assisted in attributing a number of paintings that were deemed lost to Gerard Seghers.
