= List of compositions by Gustav Mahler =

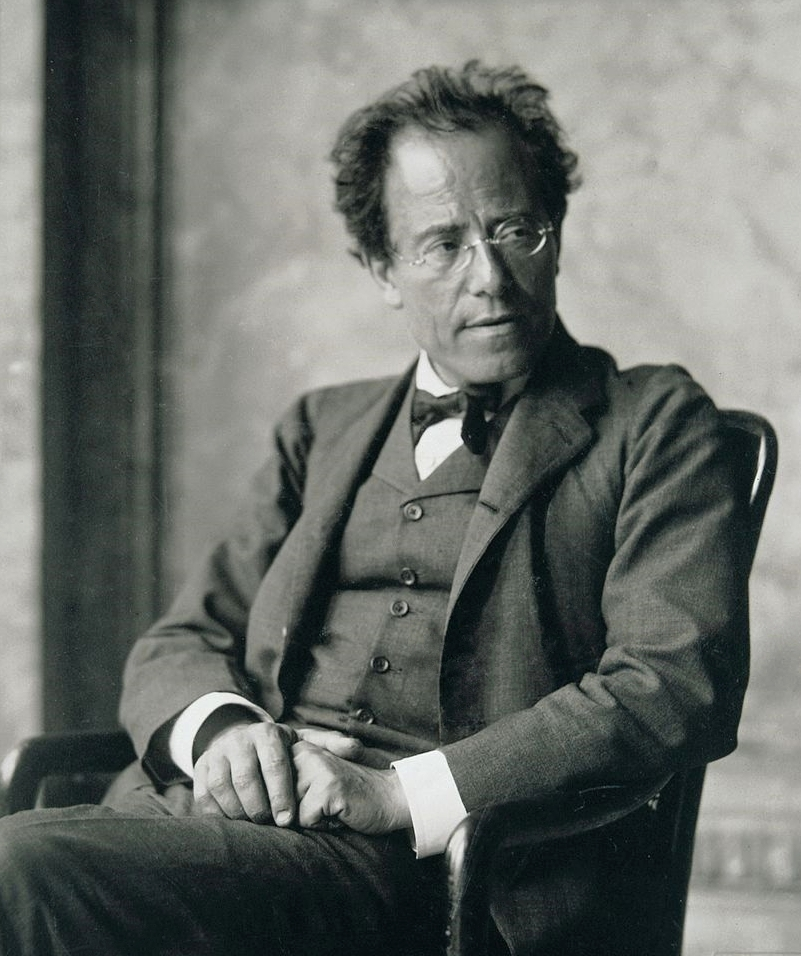
Gustav Mahler photographed by Moritz Nähr in 1907.

The musical compositions of Gustav Mahler (1860–1911) are almost exclusively in the genres of song and symphony. In his juvenile years he attempted to write opera and instrumental works; all that survives musically from those times is a single movement from a piano quartet from around 1876–78. From 1880 onwards Mahler was a professional conductor whose composing activities had to be fitted around concert and theatrical engagements. Nevertheless, over the next 30 years he produced nine complete symphonies and sketches for a tenth, several orchestral song cycles and many other songs with piano or orchestral accompaniment. Mahler's symphonies are generally on an expansive scale, requiring large forces in performance, and are among the longest in the concert repertoire.

Mahler scholar Deryck Cooke divides Mahler's compositions into separate creative phases, preceded by a "juvenile" period up to 1880. The earliest surviving whole work is Das klagende Lied (The Song of Lament), a cantata for soloists, chorus and orchestra which was completed in 1880 just before Mahler took up his first conducting post. In Cooke's chronology Mahler's first period as a mature composer extends over 20 years, to 1900, and includes his first four symphonies, his first song cycle Lieder eines fahrenden Gesellen ("Songs of a Wayfarer") and numerous other songs. The period includes Mahler's Wunderhorn phase, after his discovery in 1887 of the German folk-poems collected by Achim von Arnim and Clemens Brentano under the title Des Knaben Wunderhorn ("The Young Lad's Magic Horn"). Music critic Neville Cardus writes that this anthology nourished the composer's "pantheistic feelings about life and the world ... in which an all-embracing love [makes] all creatures kin." Mahler set 24 of these poems to music; three were absorbed into his Second, Third and Fourth symphonies; nine were used to create Volumes II and III of Lieder und Gesänge ("Songs and Airs"), and the remaining 12 were grouped to form Mahler's own Wunderhorn song cycle.

Cooke dates Mahler's "middle period" as between 1901 and 1907, covering the trio of instrumental symphonies (Fifth, Sixth and Seventh), the massive Eighth Symphony, and the settings of poems by Friedrich Rückert including the Kindertotenlieder cycle and the Rückert-Lieder. The final period covers the last works: the symphonic Das Lied von der Erde ("The Song of the Earth") and the Ninth and Tenth Symphonies. None of these late works were performed during Mahler's lifetime. The unfinished Tenth Symphony was rendered by Deryck Cooke into a "performing version" which was first performed in London in 1964.

== Summary of surviving works ==
=== Early works ===
- 1876: Piano Quartet in A minor
- 1878–80: Das klagende Lied
- 1880: Three Lieder: "Im Lenz"; "Winterlied"; "Maitanz im Grünen"
- 1880–83: Lieder und Gesänge Vol. I (five songs)
- 1885–86: Lieder eines fahrenden Gesellen (four songs)
- 1884: Der Trompeter von Säckingen (lost, except for movement Blumine that was included in early versions of Symphony No. 1)

=== Wunderhorn period ===
- 1887–88: Die Drei Pintos adaptation
- 1887–90: Lieder und Gesänge Vol. II (four songs)
- 1887–90: Lieder und Gesänge Vol. III (five songs)
- 1884–88: Symphony No. 1 in D
- 1888–94: Symphony No. 2
- 1892: "Das himmlische Leben" (Wunderhorn setting later used in Symphony No. 4)
- 1892–1901: Des Knaben Wunderhorn (12 songs)
- 1894–96: Symphony No. 3
- 1899–1901: Symphony No. 4

=== Middle period ===
- 1901–04: Rückert-Lieder (five songs)
- 1901–04: Kindertotenlieder (five songs)
- 1901–02: Symphony No. 5
- 1903–04: Symphony No. 6 in A minor
- 1904–05: Symphony No. 7
- 1906–07: Symphony No. 8 in E♭

=== Late works ===
- 1908–09: Das Lied von der Erde
- 1909–10: Symphony No. 9
- 1910: Symphony No. 10 in F♯ (unfinished; continuous draft score)

== List of works ==
Type	Date of composition	German title (original title)	English title	Scoring	Premiere performance	Notes	References
Stage	1875–1878	Herzog Ernst von Schwaben	Ernst, Duke of Swabia	for voices and orchestra	not performed	music and libretto (by Josef Steiner) lost	
Stage	1878–1880	Die Argonauten		for voices and orchestra	not performed	music and libretto (by Mahler and Steiner) lost	
Stage	1879–1883	Rübezahl		for voices and orchestra	not performed	music lost, but some may have been incorporated into early songs and/or parts of Das Klagende Lied; libretto (by Mahler) held privately	
Stage	1884	Der Trompeter von Säckingen	The Trumpeter of Säckingen	for orchestra	Kassel, 23 June 1884	incidental music to play by Josef Viktor von Scheffel; most music lost; first number became the "Blumine" andante in the original version of Symphony No. 1	
Stage	1886–1887	Die drei Pintos	The Three Pintos	for voices and orchestra	Leipzig, 20 January 1888	completion of opera by Carl Maria von Weber; Mahler arranged Weber's sketches and other music from Weber's minor works, and composed a small amount himself	
Chamber music	1875–1876	Sonate	Sonata	for violin and piano	Iglau, 31 July 1876 & 12 September 1876, with Mahler at the piano	lost	
Chamber music	1876	Klavierquartett a-Moll	Piano Quartet in A minor (first movement)	for violin, viola, cello and piano	possibly performed at Vienna Conservatory 10 July 1876	first verified public performance: New York, 12 February 1964	
Chamber music	1876–1878	Klavierquartett g-Moll	Piano Quartet in G minor (scherzo fragments)	for violin, viola, cello and piano	Frankfurt/M (Radio) 10 March 1932 and New York, 12 February 1964	approximately 36 bars of music	
Chamber music	1875–1878	Klavierquintett	Piano Quintet	for 2 violins, viola, cello and piano	performed at the Vienna Conservatory, 11 July 1878, Mahler at the piano	lost	
Piano	1877	Suite	Suite	for piano	performed at the Vienna Conservatory on an unknown date	lost; apparently the piece was awarded a prize by the Conservatory	
Orchestral	1877		[Student Symphony]	for orchestra	not performed	lost; rehearsed at the Conservatory under Joseph Hellmesberger, and rejected	
Orchestral / choral	1878–1880	Das klagende Lied, Kantate: 1. Waldmärchen; 2. Der Spielmann; 3. Hochzeitstück	The Song of Lament, Cantata	for soprano, alto, tenor, chorus and orchestra	Vienna, 17 February 1901 (movements II and III); Brno Radio, 8 November 1934 (original version)	words by Mahler; unsuccessful Beethoven Prize entry, 1881	
Orchestral	1882–1883		Symphony in A minor	for orchestra	not performed	lost; possibly a more developed version of the "Student Symphony" rejected by Hellmesberger	
Orchestral	1888	Blumine	Blumine	for orchestra	Budapest, 20 November 1889 (as part of Symphony No. 1)	originally planned for use as movement II of Symphony No. 1, dropped in 1893	
Orchestral	1884–1888	1. Sinfonie D-Dur	Symphony No. 1 in D major	for orchestra	Budapest, 20 November 1889 (five-movement version)	originally 5 movements, later 4; originally a symphonic poem, given title "Titan" at second performance, title later discarded; in revisions 1893–96 "Blumine" andante withdrawn	
Orchestral	1888	Todtenfeier [sic]	Todtenfeier (Funeral Rites)	for orchestra	Berlin, 16 March 1896	symphonic poem; later reworked as movement I of Symphony No. 2	
Orchestral / choral	1888–1894	2. Sinfonie c-Moll "Auferstehungssinfonie"	Symphony No. 2 in C minor "Resurrection"	for soprano, alto, mixed chorus, organ and orchestra	Berlin, 4 March 1895 (movements I, II and III); Berlin, 13 December 1895 (complete)	5 movements; movement I: 1888 symphonic poem Todtenfeier; movement IV: "Urlicht" from Des Knaben Wunderhorn collection; movement V: text by Mahler and Friedrich Gottlieb Klopstock	
Orchestral / choral	1893–1896	3. Sinfonie d-Moll	Symphony No. 3 in D minor	for alto, women's chorus, boys' chorus and orchestra	Krefeld, 9 June 1902	6 movements; movement IV: "O Mensch! Gib acht!" from Also sprach Zarathustra (Friedrich Nietzsche); movement V: "Es sungen drei Engel" from Des Knaben Wunderhorn collection	
Orchestral / vocal	1899–1900	4. Sinfonie G-Dur	Symphony No. 4 in G major	for soprano and orchestra	Munich, 25 November 1901	4 movements; revised 1901–10; movement IV: "Das himmlische Leben" from Des Knaben Wunderhorn collection, originally intended for Symphony No. 3, composed in 1892	
Orchestral	1901–1902	5. Sinfonie cis-Moll	Symphony No. 5 in C♯ minor	for orchestra	Cologne, 18 October 1904	5 movements; repeatedly revised up to Mahler's death	
Orchestral	1903–1904	6. Sinfonie a-Moll	Symphony No. 6 in A minor	for orchestra	Essen, 27 May 1906	4 movements; revised 1906 and repeatedly thereafter	
Orchestral	1904–1905	7. Sinfonie e-Moll	Symphony No. 7 in E minor	for orchestra	Prague, 19 September 1908	5 movements; revised repeatedly from 1905; known as Lied der Nacht ("Song of the Night"), though not named by Mahler	
Orchestral / choral	1906–1907	8. Sinfonie Es-Dur; 1. Teil: Hymnus „Veni, creator spiritus“; 2. Teil: Schlußszene von Goethes „Faust II“	Symphony No. 8 in E♭ major Part I: Hymn "Veni creator spiritus" Part II: Closing Scene from Goethe's Faust	for 3 sopranos, 2 altos, tenor, baritone, bass, 2 mixed choruses, boys' choir, organ and orchestra	Munich, 12 & 13 September 1910	known also as "Sinfonie der Tausend" ("Symphony of a Thousand"), though not named as by Mahler; divided in two "Teile" (parts, sections) instead of the more conventional movements	
Orchestral / vocal	1908–1909	Das Lied von der Erde	The Song of the Earth	for alto or baritone, tenor and orchestra	Munich, 20 November 1911	song cycle; words from ancient Chinese poems in translation by Hans Bethge	
Orchestral	1909–1910	9. Sinfonie D-Dur	Symphony No. 9 in D major	for orchestra	Vienna, 26 June 1912	4 movements	
Orchestral	1910	10. Sinfonie Fis-Dur	Symphony No. 10 in F♯ major	for orchestra	Vienna, 12 October 1924 (movements I and III); complete performing version (Deryck Cooke) London, 13 August 1964	incomplete; Mahler drafted five movements but scored only the first and third; Apart from Cooke's, five other performing versions had been recorded up to 2010; Frans Bouwman has created a critical and annotated publication of all the surviving manuscript pages of the 10th Symphony	
Vocal	1876–1879		[Two Song Fragments]		Copenhagen, 10 February 1985	song settings; one fragment identified as a setting of "Weder Glück noch Stern" (Heinrich Heine, 1830) and the other "Im wunderschönen Monat Mai" (Heinrich Heine)	
Vocal	1880	Drei Lieder für Tenorstimme und Klavier: 1. "Im Lenz"; 2. "Winterlied"; 3. "Maitanz im Grünen"	3 Songs	for tenor and piano	Brno, 30 September 1934 (radio broadcast)	words by Mahler; from a projected set of five songs	
Vocal	1880–1883	Frühlingsmorgen	Spring Morning	for voice and piano	Budapest, 13 November 1889	words by Richard Leander; published in Lieder und Gesänge, Volume I	
Vocal	1880–1883	Erinnerung	Memory	for voice and piano	Budapest, 13 November 1889	words by Richard Leander; published in Lieder und Gesänge, Volume I	
Vocal	1880–1883	Hans und Grethe	Hans and Grethe	for voice and piano	Prague, 18 April 1886	words by Mahler; a reworking of "Maitanz im Grünen" (from Drei Lieder, 1880); published in Lieder und Gesänge, Volume I	
Vocal	1880–1883	Serenade aus Don Juan	Serenade from Don Juan	for voice and piano	Leipzig, 28 October 1887	words by Tirso de Molina; published in Lieder und Gesänge, Volume I	
Vocal	1880–1883	Phantasie aus Don Juan	Imagination	for voice and piano	Leipzig, 28 October 1887	words by Tirso de Molina; published in Lieder und Gesänge, Volume I	
Vocal	1883–1885	Lieder eines fahrenden Gesellen: 1. Wenn mein Schatz Hochzeit macht 2. Ging heut Morgen übers Feld; 3. Ich hab'ein glühend Messer; 4. Die zwei blauen Augen von meinem Schatz	Songs of a Wayfarer, Song cycle: 1. When My Sweetheart Is Married; 2. I Went This Morning over the Field; 3. I Have a Gleaming Knife; 4. The Two Blue Eyes of My Beloved	for voice and piano or orchestra	Berlin, 16 March 1896 (with orchestra)	setting of four poems by Mahler; originally with piano accompaniment, orchestral setting added between 1891 and 1895; a performance with piano accompaniment may have preceded Berlin 1896	
Vocal	1887–1890	Um schlimme Kinder artig zu machen	How to Make Naughty Children Behave	for voice and piano	Munich 1899–1900 season	poem from Des Knaben Wunderhorn; published in Lieder und Gesänge, Volume II	
Vocal	1887–1890	Ich ging mit Lust durch einem grünen Wald	I Walked with Joy through a Green Forest	for voice and piano	Stuttgart, 13 December 1907	poem from Des Knaben Wunderhorn; published in Lieder und Gesänge, Volume II	
Vocal	1887–1890	Aus! Aus!	Out! Out!	for voice and piano	Hamburg, 29 April 1892	poem from Des Knaben Wunderhorn; published in Lieder und Gesänge, Volume II	
Vocal	1887–1890	Starke Einbildungskraft	Strong Imagination	for voice and piano	Stuttgart, 13 December 1907	poem from Des Knaben Wunderhorn; published in Lieder und Gesänge, Volume II	
Vocal	1887–1890	Zu Strassburg auf der Schanz	On the Ramparts at Strasbourg	for voice and piano	Helsinki, November 1906	poem from Des Knaben Wunderhorn; published in Lieder und Gesänge, Volume III	
Vocal	1887–1890	Ablösung im Sommer	The Summer Changing of the Guard	for voice and piano	Vienna, 29 January 1905	poem from Des Knaben Wunderhorn; published in Lieder und Gesänge, Volume III; an orchestral adaptation of the song is used as movement III of Symphony No. 3	
Vocal	1887–1890	Scheiden und Meiden	Parting Is Painful	for voice and piano	Budapest, 13 November 1889	poem from Des Knaben Wunderhorn; published in Lieder und Gesänge, Volume III	
Vocal	1887–1890	Nicht wiedersehen!	Never to Meet Again!	for voice and piano	Hamburg, 29 April 1892	poem from Des Knaben Wunderhorn; published in Lieder und Gesänge, Volume III	
Vocal	1887–1890	Selbstgefühl	Self-esteem	for voice and piano	Vienna, 15 February 1900	poem from Des Knaben Wunderhorn; published in Lieder und Gesänge, Volume III	
Vocal	1892	Urlicht	Primeval Light	for voice and piano or orchestra	Berlin, 13 December 1895 (as part of Symphony No. 2)	poem from Des Knaben Wunderhorn; re-orchestrated July 1893 for use as movement IV of Symphony No. 2	
Vocal	1892	Das himmlische Leben	The Heavenly Life	for voice and orchestra	Hamburg, 27 October 1893 (with orchestra)	poem from Des Knaben Wunderhorn; used as movement IV of Symphony No. 4; original poem entitled "Der Himmel hängtvoll Geigen"	
Vocal	1892	Der Schildwache Nachtlied	The Sentinel's Nightsong	for voice and piano or orchestra	Berlin, 12 December 1892 (with orchestra)	poem from Des Knaben Wunderhorn	
Vocal	1892	Verlor'ne Müh	Labour Lost	for voice and piano or orchestra	Berlin, 12 December 1892 (with orchestra)	poem from Des Knaben Wunderhorn	
Vocal	1892	Trost im Unglück	Solace in Misfortune	for voice and piano or orchestra	Hamburg, 27 October 1893 (with orchestra)	poem from Des Knaben Wunderhorn	
Vocal	1892	Wer hat dies Liedlein erdacht?	Who Thought Up This Song?	for voice and piano or orchestra	Hamburg, 27 October 1893 (with orchestra)	poem from Des Knaben Wunderhorn	
Vocal	1892–1893	Das irdische Leben	The Earthly Life	for voice and piano or orchestra	Vienna, 14 January 1900 (with orchestra)	poem from Des Knaben Wunderhorn	
Vocal	1893	Des Antonius von Padua Fischpredigt	St. Anthony of Padua's Sermon to the Fish	for voice and piano or orchestra	Vienna, 29 January 1905 (with orchestra)	poem from Des Knaben Wunderhorn; an orchestral adaptation of the song is used as movement III of Symphony No. 2	
Vocal	1893	Rheinlegendchen	The Little Rhine Legend	for voice and piano or orchestra	Hamburg, 27 October 1893 (with orchestra)	poem from Des Knaben Wunderhorn	
Vocal	1895	Es sungen drei Engel	Three Angels Sang a Sweet Air	for voice and piano or orchestra	Krefeld, 9 June 1902 (as part of Symphony No. 3)	poem from Des Knaben Wunderhorn; composed for use in Symphony No. 3; piano version published in 1899	
Vocal	1896	Lob des hohen Verstandes	Praise of Lofty Intellect	for voice and piano	Vienna, 18 January 1906	poem from Des Knaben Wunderhorn	
Vocal	1898	Lied des Verfolgten im Turm	Song of the Persecuted in the Tower	for voice and piano or orchestra	Vienna, 29 January 1905 (with orchestra)	poem from Des Knaben Wunderhorn	
Vocal	1898	Wo die schönen Trompeten blasen	Where the Fair Trumpets Sound	for voice and piano or orchestra	Vienna, 14 January 1900 (with orchestra)	poem from Des Knaben Wunderhorn	
Vocal	1899	Revelge	Reveille	for voice and piano or orchestra	Vienna, 29 January 1905	poem from Des Knaben Wunderhorn; later published with the five Rückert songs as Sieben Lieder aus letzter Zeit (Seven Last Songs)	
Vocal	1901	Der Tamboursg'sell	The Drummer Boy	for voice and piano or orchestra	Vienna, 29 January 1905	poem from Des Knaben Wunderhorn; later published with the five Rückert songs as Sieben Lieder aus letzter Zeit (Seven Last Songs)	
Vocal	1901	Blicke mir nicht in die Lieder	Do Not Look at My Songs!	for voice and piano	Vienna, 29 January 1905	poem by Friedrich Rückert	
Vocal	1901	Ich atmet' einen linden Duft	I Breathed a Gentle Fragrance	for voice and piano or orchestra	Vienna, 29 January 1905	poem by Friedrich Rückert	
Vocal	1901	Ich bin der Welt abhanden gekommen	I Am Lost to the World	for voice and piano or orchestra	Vienna, 29 January 1905	poem by Friedrich Rückert	
Vocal	1901	Um Mitternacht	At Midnight	for voice and piano or orchestra	Vienna, 29 January 1905	poem by Friedrich Rückert	
Vocal	1902	Liebst du um Schönheit	If You Love for Beauty	for voice and piano	Vienna, 8 February 1907	poem by Friedrich Rückert; Mahler neglected to orchestrate this song; an orchestral version was prepared later by a Leipzig musician, Max Puttmann	
Vocal	1901–1904; 1901; 1901; 1901; 1904; 1904	Kindertotenlieder: 1. Nun will die Sonn' so hell aufgeh'n 2. Nun seh' ich wohl, warum so dunkle Flammen; 3. Wenn dein Mütterlein; 4. Oft denk' ich, sie sind nur ausgegangen 5. In diesem Wetter, in diesem Braus	Songs on the Death of Children: 1. Now the Sun Wants to Rise as Brightly; 2. Now I See Well, Why with Such Dark Flames; 3. When Your Mother; 4. I Often Think: They Have Only Just Gone Out; 5. In This Weather, in This Windy Storm	for voice and orchestra	Vienna, 29 January 1905	poems by Friedrich Rückert	

== Dresden archive ==
The possibility of previously unknown early Mahler works emerged when, in 1938, the Dutch conductor Willem Mengelberg revealed the existence of an archive of manuscripts in Dresden, in the hands of Marion von Weber, with whom Mahler had been romantically involved in the 1880s. Mengelberg claimed that these manuscripts included drafts of four early symphonies, which he and the German composer Max von Schillings had played through on the piano. Mahler historian Donald Mitchell writes: "Though one may perhaps be a shade sceptical about the existence of four symphonies, each of them completely carried through, the strong possibility remains that some important manuscripts, either early symphonies or parts of early symphonies, were to be found in Dresden." The archive was almost certainly destroyed in the bombing of Dresden in February 1945.

== Symphonies ==
- Symphony No. 1 nicknamed "the Titan"
- Symphony No. 2 nicknamed "Resurrection"
- Symphony No. 3
- Symphony No. 4
- Symphony No. 5
- Symphony No. 6 nicknamed "Tragic"
- Symphony No. 7 nicknamed "Song of the Night"
- Symphony No. 8 nicknamed "Symphony of a Thousand" (because of its grand-scale instrumentation)
- Symphony No. 9
- Symphony No. 10 (unfinished)

Many sources indicate that Das Lied von der Erde (English: The Song of the Earth) was considered a symphony but marked as a song by the composer, due to a superstition by Mahler that the 9th symphony was cursed, mostly because Beethoven, Bruckner, Schubert, and Dvorak all died with only sketches of a tenth symphony.

== Arrangements and editions ==
In his capacity as a conductor Mahler was responsible for many rescorings of works by, among others, J.S. Bach, Beethoven and Schumann. He also prepared string orchestra versions of Beethoven's String Quartet No. 11 and Schubert's Death and the Maiden Quartet, and a four-hand piano arrangement of Bruckner's Third Symphony.

== Notable recordings ==
Many artists recorded works of Mahler. Some boxes are available with all symphonies:

- Leonard Bernstein recorded all symphonies with New York Philharmonic during the 1960's; then recorded a new cycle of symphonies from the 1970's with 3 different orchestras
- Riccardo Chailly recorded all symphonies with the Royal Concertgebouw Orchestra
- Bernard Haitink recorded all symphonies with the Royal Concertgebouw Orchestra
- Valery Gergiev recorded all symphonies with the London Symphony Orchestra
- Rafael Kubelík recorded all symphonies with the Bavarian Radio Symphony Orchestra
- Lorin Maazel recorded all symphonies with the Philharmonia Orchestra
- Klaus Tennstedt recorded all symphonies with the London Philharmonic Orchestra
- Georg Solti recorded all symphonies with the Chicago Symphony Orchestra
- Gary Bertini recorded all symphonies with the WDR Symphony Orchestra Cologne (or the Cologne Radio Symphony Orchestra)
- Yevgeny Svetlanov recorded all symphonies with the Symphony Orchestra of the Russian Federation (formerly the USSR Symphony Orchestra)
- Maurice Abravanel recorded all symphonies with the Utah Symphony Orchestra
- Michael Tilson Thomas (or MTT) recorded all symphonies with the San Francisco Symphony Orchestra

== Sources ==
- Bloomfield, Theodore (1990). "In Search of Mahler's Tenth: The Four Performing Versions as seen by a Conductor". The Musical Quarterly. 74 (2). Oxford University Press: 175–96. doi:10.1093/mq/74.2.175. JSTOR 742188.
- Bouwman, Frans (1990). "Unfinished Business: editing Mahler's 10th". The Musical Times. 142 (4). The Musical Times Publications Ltd: 43–51. doi:10.2307/1004576. JSTOR 1004576.
- Carr, Jonathan (1998). Mahler: a biography. New York: The Overlook Press. ISBN 0-87951-802-2.
- Cardus, Neville (1965). Gustav Mahler: His Mind and his Music. London: Victor Gollancz.
- Cooke, Deryck (1980). Gustav Mahler: An Introduction to his Music. London: Faber Music. ISBN 0-571-10087-2.
- Franklin, Peter (2007). Macy, Laura (ed.). "Mahler, Gustav". Oxford Music Online. Archived from the original on 1 June 2013.
- Martner, Knud, Mahler's Concerts, Kaplan Foundation, New York 2010
- Mitchell, Donald (1995). Gustav Mahler: Vol. I The Early Years. Berkeley: University of California Press. ISBN 0-520-20214-7.
- Mitchell, Donald (2005). Gustav Mahler: Vol. II The Wunderhorn Years: Chronicles and Commentaries. Woodbridge UK: Boydell Press. ISBN 1-84383-003-5.
- Sadie, Stanley, ed. (1980). New Grove Dictionary of Music and Musicians. Vol. 11. London: Macmillan. ISBN 0-333-23111-2.
- Vernon, David (2022). Beauty & Sadness: Mahler's 11 Symphonies. Edinburgh: Candle Row Press. ISBN 978-1739659905.
