= There Was a Crooked Man =

Traditional song

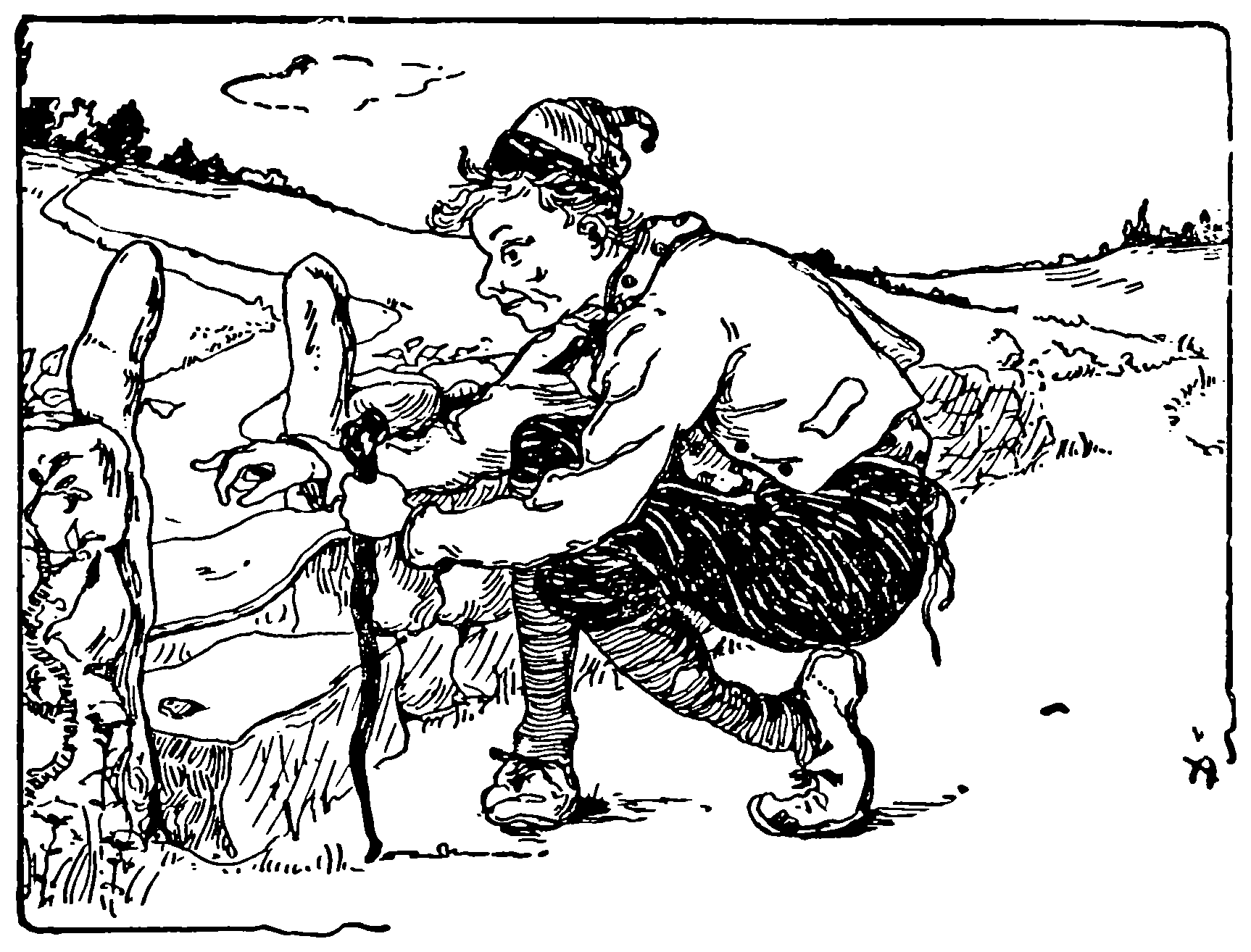

Nursery rhyme
- Published: 1842
- Songwriter: Unknown

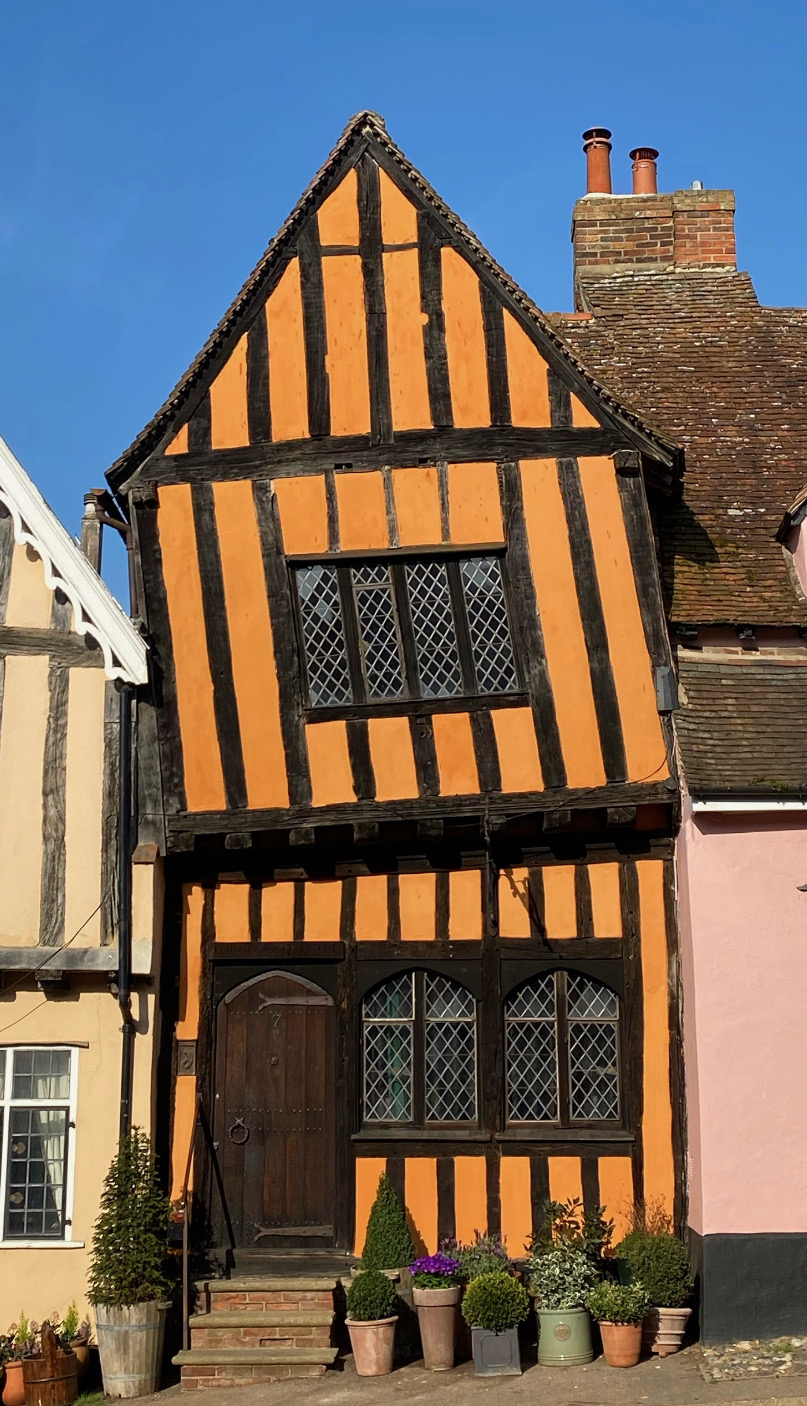
The Crooked House in Lavenham, England

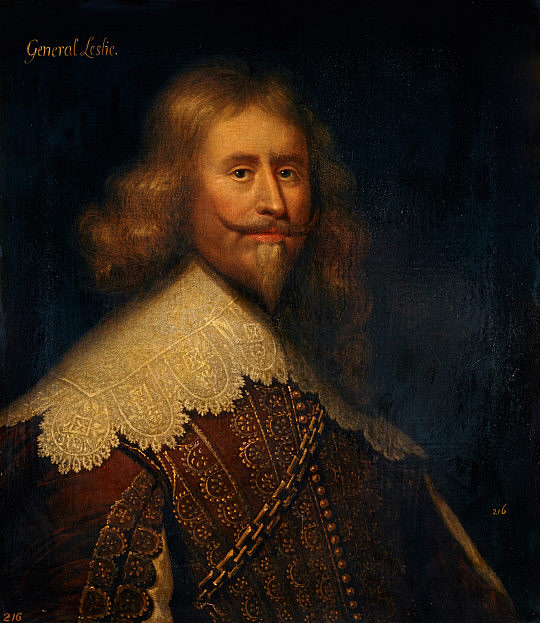
Alexander Leslie is reputed to be the crooked old man

"There Was a Crooked Man" is an English nursery rhyme. It has a Roud Folk Song Index number of 4826.

== Origin ==
The rhyme was first recorded in print by James Orchard Halliwell in 1842:

There was a crooked man, and he went a crooked mile,
He found a crooked sixpence against a crooked stile;
He bought a crooked cat, which caught a crooked mouse,
And they all liv'd together in a little crooked house.

It gained popularity in the early twentieth century. One legend suggests that this nursery rhyme originated in the once prosperous wool merchant's village of Lavenham, about 70 miles northeast of London, having been inspired by its multicolored half-timbered houses leaning at irregular angles as if they are supporting each other. One Lavenham house in particular, "The Crooked House" is often cited as the inspiration for the rhyme.

Other sources state that the poem originates from British history, specifically the period of the Scottish Stuart King Charles I of England (reigned 1625–1649). The crooked man is reputed to be the Scottish General Sir Alexander Leslie, who signed a covenant securing religious and political freedom for Scotland. The "crooked stile" in the poem was the alliance between the parliaments of England and Scotland or the border between the two, depending on the source. "They all livied together in a little crooked house" refers to the fact that the English and Scots had at last come to an agreement, despite the continuing great animosity between the two peoples, who nonetheless had to live with each other due to their common border.

The great recoinage around 1696 led to sixpence coins that were made of very thin silver and were easily bent, becoming "crooked".

== Recording ==
The song Don't Let the Rain Come Down was based on this rhyme, first recorded by Serendipity Singers in 1964.
