= Hootenanny (TV series) =

American musical variety television show

- Opening title of show which aired October 12, 1963
- Directed by: Garth Dietrick
- Presented by: Jack Linkletter
- Country of origin: United States
- No. of episodes: 43

Production
- Running time: 26–52 minutes

Original release
- Network: ABC
- Release: April 6, 1963 – September 12, 1964

Hootenanny is an American musical variety television show broadcast on ABC from April 1963 to September 1964. The program was hosted by Jack Linkletter. The theme song for the show was "Hootenanny Saturday Night", with words by Alfred Uhry and music by Richard Lewine.

It primarily featured pop-oriented folk music acts, including the Journeymen, the Limeliters, the Chad Mitchell Trio, the New Christy Minstrels, the Brothers Four, Ian & Sylvia, the Big 3, Hoyt Axton, Judy Collins, Johnny Cash, the Carter Family, Flatt & Scruggs and the Foggy Mountain Boys, the Tarriers, Bud & Travis, Josh White, Josh White Jr., Leon Bibb, and the Smothers Brothers. Although both popular and influential, the program is primarily remembered today for the controversy created when the producers blacklisted certain folk music acts, which then led to a boycott by others.

After two seasons, the shifting musical tastes of the era—heavily influenced by the British Invasion starting in 1964—and a decline in the program's variety led to its effective replacement by Shindig!, a similar but more broadly based and pop music-oriented variety program.

== History ==
=== Background ===
Hootenanny was created in 1962 by Dan Melnick, vice president of ABC-TV, and the Ashley-Steiner Talent Agency. The pilot was conceived as a half-hour special. The agency and network hired producer-director Gil Cates to oversee the initial production. It was Cates' idea to tape the program at a college campus, and to liberally include the student audience on camera, singing and clapping along with the music. Cates staged the show as theater in the round, with the students seated on the floor or in bleachers, surrounding the performers.

With Cates at the helm, the pilot was video taped in the fall of 1962 at Syracuse University in New York. Fred Weintraub, owner of The Bitter End, a folk music club in New York's Greenwich Village, served as talent coordinator (and continued to do so throughout the series' run), ensuring that performers would not be limited to clients of the Ashley-Steiner agency.

New York radio personality Jean Shepherd was the original emcee, and four folk acts appeared in the pilot: The Limeliters, Mike Settle, Jo Mapes, and Clara Ward's Gospel Singers. Rather than showcase acts once per show, each performer/group would do a song, then yield the stage to another and return later in the program. Occasionally, two otherwise unrelated acts would team up for a duet. The final result was so well-received by network executives that the idea of airing the pilot as a stand-alone special was jettisoned, and production on the series began.

Producer Richard Lewine was put in charge and Garth Dietrick assumed the director's chair. The first thing Lewine did was to replace Shepherd with Jack Linkletter. (When the original pilot aired in June 1963, Shepherd's scenes had been removed and Linkletter was edited in.) As Shepherd had done, Linkletter would discreetly provide information about the performer(s) and/or the song(s) they would sing as each act took the stage. Linkletter described his role as "an interpreter. The people at home hear what I have to say, but not the ones at the performance. (The feeling is) that the Hootenanny would be going on whether we were there or not." On February 26, 1963, their first two Hootenanny programs were taped at George Washington University in the District of Columbia.

=== Series production ===
Between February 26 and April 30, 12 Hootenanny shows were taped at six colleges. The production team would arrive at a campus on Monday to begin rehearsal and camera blocking. Taping of both half-hour programs would take place on Tuesday (later, when Hootenanny expanded to an hour, one program each would be taped on Tuesday and Wednesday). Students were permitted to attend the rehearsals, many of them volunteering to be runners for the various acts and production staff.

The first Hootenanny to air had been taped at the University of Michigan in March, and starred The Limeliters, Bob Gibson, Bud & Travis, and Bonnie Dobson. (Easily the best known folk group among those who appeared, The Limeliters would headline in seven of the first 13 episodes, literally appearing at least every other week.)

=== Critical reaction ===
Overall, critical reaction was favorable, although Variety's reviewer felt it "lacked the spark and spirit that is found in 'live' college and concert dates" and predicted the series would do little to increase the popularity of folk music – a prediction that would soon prove erroneous. Most critics agreed with the New York Times' Jack Gould, who labeled Hootenanny "the hit of the spring."

The Nielsen ratings justified ABC's faith in the concept. The first program garnered a 26% share of the viewing audience; this increased to 32% for the second show. By the end of April, ABC announced that Hootenanny would return in the fall as a one-hour show, provided the ratings held up. They did - Hootenanny soon becoming the network's second-most popular show, after Ben Casey, with a peak audience of 11 million viewers per week.

By the time Hootenanny concluded its first 13 weeks, a craze had been born. A front-page Variety story noted, "the big demand for the folk performers in virtually all areas of show biz (records, concerts, college dates, TV, pix) is stimulating a new folk form that can appeal to a mass audience. Among writers now contributing to the new-styled folk song are Bob Dylan, Mike Settle, Tom Paxton, Shel Silverstein, Bob Gibson, Malvina Reynolds, Oscar Brand, Pete Seeger, Woody Guthrie." MGM's Sam Katzman produced Hootenanny Hoot, a motion picture featuring the Brothers Four, Johnny Cash, Judy Henske, Joe and Eddie, Cathie Taylor, the Gateway Trio, and Sheb Wooley – all of whom did or would appear on Hootenanny. Record labels from the independent Folkways and Elektra to the mainstream Columbia and RCA-Victor released folk music compilation albums with "Hootenanny" in the title.

=== Magazines ===
Issue of Robert Shelton's Hootenanny magazine

Two bimonthly magazines appeared on newsstands: Hootenanny, edited by Robert Shelton with Lynn Musgrave, and ABC-TV Hootenanny, edited by music critic Linda Solomon. Mainstream magazines such as Time and Look reported on the folk craze, with the latter calling Hootenanny the "final proof that folk music has gone big-time."

Despite its popular appeal - or perhaps because of it - the overall reaction to Hootenanny by serious folk music critics was one of scorn. In an article for Shelton's Hootenanny magazine, Nat Hentoff savaged the program, writing, "Aside from the fact that a sizable proportion of each week's cast has been echt fake, the 'Hootenanny Show' aura has also diluted the work of many of its performers with some credentials as folk singers." He also chided the students comprising the audience: "(Be) not deceived that the campus activists for social change are in the majority. If you want to see the moyen American college student, watch the TV 'Hootenanny' show." Editor Shelton, however, eventually acknowledged that "some good performances did sneak through; some obscure musicians won recognition. The TV series probably led millions of its viewers toward quality song."

=== Renewal and format changes ===
When the series resumed in the fall of 1963, it had been expanded to a full hour with a slightly altered format. Although the program continued to primarily showcase folk music, other genres were added to the mix; jazz (represented by such performers as Herbie Mann, Pete Fountain, Stan Getz, and Stan Rubin's Tigertown Five), country (artists such as Johnny Cash, Eddy Arnold, Flatt and Scruggs, and Homer and Jethro) and gospel (the Staple Singers, Clara Ward, Bessie Griffin, and Alex Bradford). The second season also added a spot for stand-up comedy; the best-known participants were Woody Allen, Bill Cosby (in his network TV debut), Jackie Vernon, Pat Harrington, Jr., and Stiller and Meara. Changes in the format continued as the season progressed. Commencing with episodes airing in January 1964, all the artists remained on stage throughout the show, seated behind whoever was performing, and Jack Linkletter no longer made all the introductions; many were handled by the artists themselves, one act introducing another. A permanent theme song was also introduced this season: Hootenanny Saturday Night, written by Lewine and Alfred Uhry. The theme was performed by the artists appearing that particular week; although the Chad Mitchell Trio were the first to sing it, the version performed by the Brothers Four at the University of Pittsburgh was released by Columbia Records as a single.

The second season also had the debut of Hootenanny's "home-grown" creation, the Serendipity Singers. "Discovered" by talent coordinator Fred Weintraub, the Serendipities were a nine-member folk chorale closely patterned after the New Christy Minstrels. The group appeared in eight of the 30 shows produced that season and had a major hit in spring 1964 with "Don't Let the Rain Come Down (Crooked Little Man)". The group, with various member changes, continued for decades after Hootenanny's demise.

=== Boycott ===
First issue of Linda Solomon's ABC-TV Hootenanny magazine

Even before it reached the airwaves, Hootenanny created controversy in the folk music world. In mid-March, word circulated that the producers would not invite folk singer Pete Seeger, nor Seeger's former group the Weavers, to appear on the show. Both Seeger and the Weavers were alleged to have overly left-wing views; in Seeger's case, he had been convicted of contempt of Congress for refusing to discuss his political affiliations with the House Un-American Activities Committee in 1955 – although the conviction had been overturned on appeal in May 1962.

Variety broke the story in its March 20, 1963, issue, reporting that folksinger Joan Baez had refused to appear on the show because of the blacklisting. That same week, several folk artists gathered at The Village Gate in New York City to discuss forming an organized boycott, but opted instead to send telegrams of concern to ABC executives, producer Lewine, and the Federal Communications Commission. Although Seeger and the Weavers were also banned from NBC and CBS variety shows, the Hootenanny issue rankled because Seeger and his long-time associate Woody Guthrie were the first to popularize the term "hootenanny" as a gathering of folk musicians.

Seeger encouraged his fellow artists not to boycott, but to accept Hootenanny invitations, so as to promote the popularity of the folk genre. Nevertheless, by the end of March, three other folk acts had joined Joan Baez in boycotting the show: Tom Paxton, Barbara Dane, and the Greenbriar Boys, a bluegrass trio. Some weeks later, Guthrie disciple Ramblin' Jack Elliott announced he, too, was boycotting Hootenanny.

Over the years, other arguably better-known folk performers have been associated with the Hootenanny boycott; these include Dylan (who mentioned the show in his song "Talkin' John Birch Paranoid Blues"), Peter, Paul & Mary, Phil Ochs, and the Kingston Trio. However, the ones who specifically announced their participation in the boycott at the time were Joan Baez, Barbara Dane, Tom Paxton, Ramblin' Jack Elliott, and the Greenbriar Boys. The Greenbriar Boys eventually appeared on the October 19, 1963, broadcast, backing Los Angeles folk and country singer Dian James, but John Herald, the band's guitarist and lead vocalist, did not participate. Some artists who had performed on the show would refuse future Hootenanny appearances for creative, rather than political, reasons; these include Judy Collins and Theodore Bikel.

With the expansion of Hootenanny to one hour weekly, effective with the broadcast of September 21, 1963, the producers made overtures to Pete Seeger, but with a caveat, spelled out in a letter from network executives: "ABC will consider Mr. Seeger's use on the program only if he furnishes an affidavit as to his past and present affiliations, if any, with the Communist Party, and/or with the Communist front organizations. Upon so doing, the company will undertake to consider his statement in relation to all the objective data available to it, and will advise you promptly [if] it will approve the employment of Mr. Seeger." Seeger, naturally, refused to provide anything that smacked of a loyalty oath, and his manager, Harold Leventhal, made the story public - which only encouraged others to refuse appearances.

=== Cancellation ===
ABC tentatively renewed Hootenanny for a third season, but a major shift in popular music brought about a last-minute reversal. The 1964 British Invasion eclipsed the folk music craze among younger viewers, resulting in a decline in Hootenanny's viewership to about seven million by the end of April 1964, prior to the start of reruns. Not only viewers, but also musicians, were affected by the invasion; performers such as Gene Clark (the New Christy Minstrels), John Phillips (the Journeymen), Cass Elliot (the Big Three), and John Sebastian (the Even Dozen Jug Band) - all of whom had appeared on Hootenanny's second season - abandoned folk music to form very successful pop-rock groups including the Byrds (Clark), the Mamas & the Papas (Phillips and Elliot), and the Lovin' Spoonful (Sebastian).

Other factors also contributed to Hootenanny's demise, not least of which was repetition of both songs and artists. Eventually, audiences were seemingly likely to see the Serendipity Singers, the New Christy Minstrels, or the Brothers Four every time they watched; occasionally, they would see two of these three acts. Faced with a dwindling talent pool, growing viewer indifference, and competition in the timeslot from the Jackie Gleason Show airing on CBS, ABC announced on June 8 that Hootenanny would be cancelled. Another series with youth appeal, The Outer Limits, moved into its Saturday evening timeslot, and ABC added a hastily scheduled Wednesday-night show with more broadly focused music: Shindig!

The network erased its videotapes of the show many years ago, but kinescopes of several Hootenanny segments survive and were used to compile the Best of Hootenanny DVD set from Shout! Factory.

=== Host institutions ===
Hootenanny taped 43 programs at 22 different institutions of higher learning, mostly private colleges and universities. Eight land-grant universities hosted the show: Pennsylvania State University, Rutgers (first season), University of Arizona, UCLA, University of Maryland, University of Florida, University of Tennessee, and Purdue University (second season). Two Ivy League schools were visited: Brown University (first season) and Dartmouth College (second season), the latter during its annual Winter Carnival. Hootenanny shows were also taped at the United States Naval Academy, Annapolis, Maryland, and the United States Military Academy, West Point, New York (second season).

At the request of the then-president of Miles Laboratories, one of the show's sponsors, Hootenanny visited his alma mater, the small Salem College in Clarksburg, West Virginia (second season).

== DVD release ==
In 2007, Shout! Factory and Sony BMG Music Entertainment released The Best of Hootenanny on DVD, featuring 80 songs on three discs.
