= Dangerous Songs!? =

Studio album by Pete Seeger
- Released: 1966
- Genre: Folk
- Length: 50:00
- Label: Columbia
- Producer: John Hammond

Pete Seeger chronology
God Bless the Grass (1966)	Dangerous Songs!? (1966)	Rainbow Race (1971)

Professional ratings
Review scores
Source	Rating
Allmusic	4/5 stars

Dangerous Songs!? is a studio album by Pete Seeger and was released in 1966 on the Columbia Records label.

== Track listing ==
All tracks are written by Pete Seeger except where noted.

No.	Title	Writer(s)	Length
1.	"Medley: Robin The Bobbin/ Mary, Mary Quite Contrary/ Little Jack Horner"		0:37
2.	"Die Gedanken sind frei" (Thoughts are Free)	Arthur Kevess	1:52
3.	"Jackaro"		3:53
4.	"Never Wed An Old Man"	Oliver John Abbott	2:27
5.	"John Brown's Body"		1:51
6.	"Going Across The Mountains"		3:08
7.	"Harry Simms"	Jim Garland	2:06
8.	"King Henry"		3:29
9.	"Medley: Ode To Joy/ Goliath Goliath"		1:49
10.	"Queen Anne Front"	Robert Schmertz	3:30
11.	"Joe Hill's "Casey Jones""		2:02
12.	"One Grain of Sand"		1:51
13.	"The Pill"	Matt McGinn	2:22
14.	"Draft Dodger Rag"	Phil Ochs	2:10
15.	"Mao Tse Tung"		0:37
16.	"Walking Down Death Row"		3:46
17.	"Two From Shakespeare: Full Fathom Five/ Perchance to Win"		1:42
18.	"Beans in My Ears"	Len Chandler	3:27

Additional tracks on MP3
No.	Title	Writer(s)	Length
19.	"Equinoxal"		3:16
20.	"Joe Hill's "Casey Jones"" (Remix)		1:58
21.	"What Next?"	Len Chandler	2:28

== Personnel ==
- Pete Seeger - vocals, banjo, fretless banjo, 12-string guitar
- Fred Hellerman - vocal and guitar on "The Draft Dodger Rag"
