= At 89 =

Studio album by Pete Seeger
- Released: September 30, 2008
- Genre: Folk
- Length: 48:28
- Label: Appleseed

Pete Seeger chronology
Rainbow Race (1973)	At 89 (2008)	Pete Remembers Woody (2012)

At 89 is a studio album by Pete Seeger, released on September 30, 2008, via Appleseed Records. In 2008, the album earned Seeger the Grammy Award for Best Traditional Folk Album.

== Composition ==
The album features a blend of instrumental and vocal songs, interspersed with spoken word segments. Several tracks were recorded at the Howland Center in Beacon, NY with a large group of people working in community.

"Song of the World's Last Whale" is an anti-whaling song composed by Seeger in 1970 after he listened to the "whale song" discovered by Roger Payne. He gave its rights to the Whale Fund, an auxiliary of the New York Zoological Society which is concerned with whale conservation. Despite playing the song live, he did not record it officially until At 89.

== Track listing ==
All tracks are written by Pete Seeger except where noted.

No.	Title	Writer(s)	Length
1.	"Nameless Banjo Riff"		0:39
2.	"False from True"		2:49
3.	"Now We Sit Us Down"		1:16
4.	"Pete's Greeting" (Spoken)		0:32
5.	"Visions of Children"		2:12
6.	"Wonderful Friends"	Pete Seeger, Lorre Wyatt	3:20
7.	"The Water Is Wide"	Traditional	2:32
8.	"Pete Talks About Clearwater" (Spoken)		0:30
9.	"It's a Long Haul"	Travis Jeffrey, Seeger	1:12
10.	"Throw Away That Shad Net (How Are We Gonna Save Tomorrow?)"		4:47
11.	"Song of the World's Last Whale"		2:39
12.	"The First Settlers"	David Bernz, Seeger	5:01
13.	"The D Minor Flourish/Cindy"	Traditional	0:44
14.	"Pete's Intro to If It Can't Be Reduced" (Spoken)		0:47
15.	"If It Can't Be Reduced"		2:13
16.	"Spring Fever"		0:52
17.	"Pete Speaks About World War II" (Spoken)		0:31
18.	"When I Was Most Beautiful"		2:54
19.	"Bach at Treblinka"		1:18
20.	"We Will Love or We Will Perish"	Johann Sebastian Bach, Seeger	1:32
21.	"The Story of Tzena, Tzena, Tzena" (Spoken)		1:02
22.	"Tzena, Tzena, Tzena"	Gordon Jenkins, Seeger	2:23
23.	"One Percent Phosphorous Banjo Riff"		1:35
24.	"Pete Speaks About Involvement" (Spoken)		0:13
25.	"Or Else! (One-a These Days)"	Bernz, Seeger	3:22
26.	"Waist Deep in the Big Muddy"		3:36
27.	"Little Fat Baby"	Bernz, Seeger	4:48
28.	"Arrange and Re-Arrange"		3:18
29.	"Alleluya"	Traditional	2:00
30.	"Pete's Extroduction" (Spoken)		1:14
31.	"If This World Survives"	Malvina Reynolds, Seeger	1:39
32.	"How Soon?"		1:08

== Credits and personnel ==
=== Performers ===
- Sue Altkin – choir, chorus, vocals
- David Bernz – banjo, choir, chorus, guitar, guitar (12-string), vocals
- Robert Cagianese – additional violin ("Alleluya")
- Karen Cashin – chorus
- Sonya Cohen – vocals ("When I was most Beautiful")
- Jonathan Dickau – choir, chorus, engineer, mixing, vocals
- Angela Dourdis – chorus
- James Durst – choir, chorus, guitar ("Little Fat Baby"), vocals, ("Little Fat Baby, and "We Will Love or We Will Perish")
- Alison Hartwell – chorus
- Travis Jeffrey – vocals ("It's a long haul")
- Caroline Kruzansky – chorus, vocals ("Or Else!")
- Lisa McVey – chorus
- Sara Milonovich – violin
- Jenny Murphy – chorus
- Mark Murphy – bass, choir, chorus, vocals
- Melissa Ohrquist – chorus
- Perry Robinson – clarinet
- Martha Sandefer – choir, chorus, vocals ("Bach at Treblinka," "Little Fat Baby," and "We Will Love or We Will Perish")
- Pete Seeger – banjo, choir, chorus, guitar (12-string), guitar (nylon string), Native American flute, spoken word, vocals
- Laurie Siegel – choir, chorus, vocals
- Dave Tarlo – chorus, vocals ("Now We Sit us Down," and "We Will Love or We Will Perish")
- Bruce K. Taylor – choir, chorus, vocals
- Connie Taylor – choir, chorus, vocals
- Sarah Underhill – chorus
- The Walkabout Chorus – vocals ("Tzena, Tzena, Tzena," "If this World Survives")

=== Songwriting/Arranging ===
- Johann Sebastian Bach – composer
- David Bernz – arranger, composer, lyricist
- Travis Jeffrey – composer, lyricist
- Gordon Jenkins – composer, lyricist
- Alan Lomax – arranger, collection
- John A. Lomax – arranger, collection
- Pete Seeger – arranger, composer, lyricist
- Malvina Reynolds – composer, lyricist
- Lorre Wyatt – composer, lyricist

=== Production ===
- David Bernz – engineer, photography, producer
- Jonathan Dickau – engineer, mixing
- Christina Galbiati – graphic design
- David Glasser – mastering
- Judy Jacobs – photography
- Jim Musselman – executive producer, liner notes
- Pete Seeger – producer
