= Harold Byrns =

German-American conductor and orchestrator

Harold Byrns (13 September 1903 – 22 February 1977) was a German-American conductor and orchestrator.

== Biography ==
He was born Hans Bernstein in Hanover, Kingdom of Prussia, German Empire, in 1903. His father had formed a chamber music society in Hanover, and he followed in his father's footsteps. He studied with Walter Gieseking, Erich Kleiber and Leo Blech at the Stern Conservatory in Berlin, and became assistant to Kleiber and Blech. He worked as a conductor in Lübeck, Oldenburg, and Berlin (Staatsoper, Deutsche Oper) before emigrating to Italy in 1933 and then to the United States in 1936. He changed his name from Hans Bernstein to Harold Byrns because he felt he could not make it in America with a Jewish name. He formed his own chamber orchestra, the Harold Byrns Chamber Orchestra, which was regarded as the American counterpart of the Boyd Neel String Orchestra. While living in Los Angeles he wrote and orchestrated music for various films.

He arranged the music for Adolphe Adam's ballet Giselle for a February 1941 production by Anton Dolin at the Ballet Theatre on Broadway. In 1945 he orchestrated Lerner and Loewe's musical The Day Before Spring for Broadway. He was accepted for the role on the recommendation of Maurice Abravanel, who considered him a great orchestrator.

After the war he returned to Berlin, and he conducted at the Deutsche Oper, Komische Oper, and was a guest with various symphony orchestras, particularly the Hanover and Turin (RAI) Radio orchestras. He gave Mahler concerts with the Vienna Symphony and on Italian Radio.

Harold Byrns founded the Los Angeles Chamber Symphony in 1949. In 1950 he premiered George Antheil's Serenade No. 2.

He was associated with performances of the works of Arnold Schoenberg and to an extent made his reputation with that composer. He gave the first Los Angeles performance of Schoenberg's Chamber Symphony, Op. 9. In 1949 he conducted the Los Angeles Chamber Symphony in a concert to celebrate Schoenberg's 75th birthday. He performed Moses und Aron in 1971 with the Deutsche Oper.

On 17 October 1954, Harold Byrns conducted the first public performance of Erich Wolfgang Korngold's Symphony in F-sharp major, on Austrian radio. (It was described as "poorly rehearsed and performed", and the work would not receive its premiere concert performance until 27 November 1972, in Munich, under the baton of Rudolf Kempe). That year he also conducted the first performance of Berthold Goldschmidt's Sinfonietta with the Suisse Romande Orchestra.

He orchestrated various early works by Gustav Mahler, including six songs from Lieder und Gesänge, which were recorded as part of Giuseppe Sinopoli's complete Mahler cycle, and which have been described as "skillful and idiomatic". He was a personal friend of Mahler's widow Alma, and he played an important role in making her agree to public performances of Deryck Cooke's realisation of the 10th Symphony. She felt it was "a private love letter" from Gustav to her, and refused to even listen to a private studio recording made for her. Byrns persuaded her to listen to the tape, and she gave her immediate approval. For his devotion to Mahler, Byrns was awarded the Kilenyi Mahler Medal of Honor by the Bruckner Society of America.

Harold Byrns made a specialty of orchestrating piano and vocal/piano music. For Otto Klemperer's debut in Copenhagen in 1947, he arranged a suite from Henry Purcell's The Fairy Queen. He had a commission from Herbert von Karajan to orchestrate some piano pieces by Robert Schumann, and from Dietrich Fischer-Dieskau for some Mahler songs for which he also made the English translation. (Fischer-Dieskau and his son, Dr. Martin Fischer-Dieskau, later Chief Conductor in Canada and Taiwan, both studied conducting with Harold Byrns.) He was responsible for the complete orchestration of Nicolas Nabokov's opera Love's Labour's Lost, premiered in Brussels in 1973.

He made various recordings with the Los Angeles Chamber Symphony, including the premiere recording of Béla Bartók's Music for Strings, Percussion and Celesta and Igor Stravinsky's Violin Concerto with Ivry Gitlis.

Harold Byrns died in Berlin in 1977, and is buried there.

His son was Peter Salm (1919–1990), Professor Emeritus of Literature and German at Case Western Reserve University in Cleveland, Ohio, and a specialist in the works of Goethe and other European literary figures.
