= The Many Sides of the Serendipity Singers =

Studio album by The Serendipity Singers
- Released: 1964
- Recorded: 1964
- Genre: Easy listening
- Label: Phillips

The Serendipity Singers chronology
The Serendipity Singers (1964)	The Many Sides of the Serendipity Singers (1964)	Take Your Shoes Off with the Serendipity Singers (1964)

Singles from The Many Sides of the Serendipity Singers
- 1. "Beans in My Ears" Released: May 1964; 2. "Down Where the Wind Blows (Chilly Winds)" Released: August 1964

The Many Sides of the Serendipity Singers is the second studio album by the Serendipity Singers. It peaked at number 68 on the Billboard Top LPs chart in 1964.

== Track listing ==
Side one

1. "Let Me Fly Zion" – 1:40
2. "Beans in My Ears" – 2:06
3. "Soon It's Gonna Rain" – 2:42
4. "Mill Girls Don't Sing or Dance" – 2:22
5. "Look Away Over Yondro" – 1:58
6. "The New Frankie and Johnny Song" – 2:28

Side two

1. "You Don't Know" – 2:32
2. "Down Where the Wind Blows (Chilly Winds)" – 3:16
3. "Movin' in My Heart" – 2:06
4. "Six Foot Six" – 2:04
5. "Hi-Lili-Hi-Lo" – 2:52
6. "Fast Freight" - 2:22

== Charts ==
Chart (1964)	Peak position
US Billboard 200	68
