= Ersel Hickey =

American rockabilly singer

Background information
- Born: Ersel O'Hickey; June 27, 1934; Brighton, New York, U.S.
- Origin: Columbus, Ohio
- Died: July 12, 2004 (aged 70) Manhattan, New York, U.S.
- Genres: Rockabilly
- Occupations: Singer, musician
- Instruments: Vocals, guitar
- Years active: 1954–2004
- Labels: Fine, Epic, Kapp, Apollo, Laurie, Toot, Janus, Black Circle, Unifax, Rameses III, Parkway, Magnum

Ersel Hickey (born Ersel O'Hickey, June 27, 1934 – July 12, 2004) was an American rockabilly singer best known for his hit song "Bluebirds over the Mountain".

== Early life ==
Hickey was born in Brighton, New York, and was named after the family doctor, Dr. Ersel. His mother was from Kingston, Ontario; his father, who was Irish, died when Hickey was four. He was one of eight children. One brother's name was Allen and another brother's name was William. His mother had a nervous breakdown and was put into a mental hospital, causing Hickey to be placed in successive foster homes. He would frequently run away, living in different parts of New York State.

When Hickey was 15, he started traveling with his sister Chicky Evans, an exotic dancer. She was very popular in the carnival circuits and together they traveled for about a year. He decided to go on his own and travel with the carnival, then left and began living in Columbus, Ohio. From there he was sent to a "tough kids" home, where he became familiar with the main rhythm and blues groups and started singing with the gospel group there.

== Career ==
In 1954, Hickey heard Elvis Presley's "I Don't Care if the Sun Don't Shine" and became a devoted fan of rock and roll. He played a few venues in Rochester, New York, that his brother booked him in, and was successfully drawing audiences. It was around this time that he made his first record on Fine Records. One side was "Then I'll Be Happy", an old song; the other side was "Baby You're No Good", a song he had written. The single was released locally, but not much happened with it.

While visiting Rochester in 1957, Phil Everly told Hickey he should write his own material. That night Hickey wrote "Bluebirds Over the Mountain", which he subsequently recorded and charted at No. 75 in the United States and No. 8 in Canada. The song was later recorded by Ritchie Valens in 1958 and was a top 100 hit for The Beach Boys in the United States and the United Kingdom in 1968.

Hickey also wrote songs for other artists, including "The Millionaire" for Jackie Wilson, "A Little Bird Told Me So" for LaVern Baker, and "Don't Let the Rain Come Down", which was a US top ten hit for the Serendipity Singers.

Hickey's contribution to the genre has been recognized by the Rockabilly Hall of Fame.

In 1957, Hickey was staying with his aunt in Buffalo, New York, when he arranged to have publicity pictures taken at a local photography studio, Gene Laverne's Studio of the Stars. The pose—Hickey with his knees bent and pointing his guitar like a machine gun—was the idea of Laverne, an exotic dancer and female impersonator. The photograph appeared in 1976 on the opening page of The Rolling Stone Illustrated History of Rock & Roll.

== Influence ==
Actor Ron Thompson based many of his dance moves on Hickey's, who was Thompson's mentor and friend, for his performance in the film American Pop.

== Death ==
Hickey died at age 70 in July 2004 after surgery to remove his gallbladder at New York University Medical Center.

== Discography ==
=== Singles ===
Year	Title	Label
1955	Then I'll Be Happy/Baby You're No Good	Fine Records
1958	Bluebirds Over The Mountain/Hangin' Around (Cnd)	Epic Records 9263
1958	Bluebirds Over The Mountain/Hangin' Around	Epic Records 9278
1958	Lover's Land"/"Goin' Down That Road	Epic Records 9278
1958	"Ersel Hickey in Lover's Land"; Lover's Land/Bluebirds Over The Mountain/Goin' Down That Road/Hangin' Around	Epic Records EG 7206
1958	The Wedding/You Never Can Tell	Epic Records 9296
1959	You Threw A Dart/Don't Be Afraid of Love	Epic Records 9309
1959	I Can't Love Another/People Gotta Talk	Epic Records 9320
1959	Love in Bloom/What Do You Want (Picture Sleeve)	Epic Records 9357
1960	Stardust Brought Me You/Another Wasted Day	Epic Records 9395
1961	Teardrops at Dawn/I Guess You Could Call It Love	Kapp Records 372
1961	Lips of Rose/What Have You Done To Me	Kapp Records 406
1962	The Millionaire/Upside Down Love	Apollo Records 761
1963	Some Enchanted Evening/Put Your Mind at Ease	Laurie Records 3165
1967	Blue Skies/Tryin' To Get To You	Toot Records 602
1968	(Play On) Strings of Gitarro/There Is Just One Time	Toot Records 607
1970	Bluebirds Over The Mountain/Self Made Man	Janus Records 151
1971	Oh, Lord Look What They've Done To Your Garden/Slidin' Home	Black Circle Records 845
1972	How Unlucky Can You Get/Put It To Your Heart	Unifax Records 100
1975	Waitin' For Baby/In Spite of the Fool That I Am	Rameses II Records 2003
1982	Let Me Be Your Radio/Let Me Be Your Radio	Parkway Records
1984	Country Tough/Country Tough	Magnum Records

=== Albums ===
- Bluebirds Over The Mountain

(KAPP KM2601) KM on the sleeve, KR on the label Going Down That Road/Love in Bloom/Wedding Day/You Threw A Dart/You Never Can Tell/Don't Be Afraid of Love/I Guess You Could Call It Love/What Do You Want//Hanging Around/Another Wasted Day/Stardust Brought Me You/Blue Birds Over The Mountain/Lover's Land/Teardrops at Dawn/Self Made Man/Blue Birds Over The Mountain

- 1985 Back-Trac Records #18750 The Rockin' Bluebird:

Bluebirds Over The Mountain/Hangin' Around/You Never Can Tell/Lover's Land/Goin' Down That Road/Love in Bloom/Shame on Me/What Do You Want?/Stardust Brought Me You/Don't Be Afraid of Love

- Bluebirds Over the Mountains

Bear Family Records – BCD 15676 Bluebirds Over The Mountain (US Version)/Hangin' Around/You Never Can Tell/The Wedding/Lover's Land/Goin' Down That Road/Love in Bloom/Another Wasted Day/You Threw A Dart/Shame on Me/What Do You Want?/Stardust Brought Me You (2)/Due Time (Incomplete)/A Mighty Square Love Affair/Teardrops at Dawn/Magical Love/I Guess You Could Call It Love/Lips of Roses/What Have You Done To Me?/Stardust Brought Me You (1)/Roll on Little River (Unknown)/Don't Be Afraid of Love/People Gotta Talk/I Can't Love Another/Bluebirds Over The Mountain (CAN Version)

- Rockin Bluebird

Collectables Records – COL 6479 RELEASE DATE: January 16, 2001 Tracks: Bluebirds Over The Mountain, Hangin' Around, Goin' Down That Road, Lover's Land, You Never Can Tell, Wedding Day, Don't Be Afraid Of Love, You Threw A Dart, People Gotta Talk, I Can't Love Another, What Do You Want?, Love In Bloom, Stardust Brought Me You, Another Wasted Day, Shame On Me, Some Enchanted Evening, Put Your Mind At Ease, Rockabilly Dream, In Spite Of The Fool That
