= Soon It's Gonna Rain =

Song from The Fantasticks musical

"Soon It's Gonna Rain" is a song from the musical comedy The Fantasticks, with lyrics written by Tom Jones, and music composed by Harvey Schmidt.

== Background ==
The song was first sung by Rita Gardner and Kenneth Nelson in the original Off Broadway production of The Fantasticks. Other performers from the long-running Off-Broadway production of the show to sing the song include Kristin Chenoweth, American Idol finalist Anthony Fedorov and winner of the thirteenth season of The Amazing Race, Nick Spangler.

In the Hallmark Hall of Fame broadcast on October 18, 1964, the song was performed by John Davidson and Susan Watson.

We Five did a version of the song on their 1969 album, The Return of We Five.

In the 1995 film version of The Fantasticks, the song was performed by Joey McIntyre and Jean Louisa Kelly.

== Other recordings ==
- Barbra Streisand recorded the song for her debut solo album The Barbra Streisand Album in 1963.
- Tony Bennett - included on his album The Many Moods of Tony (1964)
- The Serendipity Singers. Included on their 1964 album The Many Sides of the Serendipity Singers.
- Blossom Dearie recorded the song for her 1967 album Soon It's Gonna Rain.
- Julie London recorded the song for her 1968 album Easy Does It.
- For his album Kidults (2001), Mandy Patinkin and Kristin Chenoweth made a recording of the song.
- Duke Ellington also recorded the song; it appeared on the 2002 album Live and Rare.
- The Singers Unlimited recorded the song in 1973 on the album Four of Us.
