= Len Chandler =

American folk musician (1935–2023)

- Born: Len Hunt Chandler Jr. May 27, 1935; Akron, Ohio, U.S.
- Died: August 28, 2023 (aged 88); San Pedro, California, U.S.
- Occupation: Musician

Len Hunt Chandler Jr. (May 27, 1935 – August 28, 2023) was an American folk singer, songwriter, and civil rights activist. Chandler was known for his powerful voice and socially conscious songs.

== Early life and education ==
Chandler was born in Akron, Ohio in 1935. He showed an early interest in music and began playing piano at age 8. Studying classical music in his early teens, he learned to play the oboe so he could join the high school band, and during his senior year joined the Akron Symphony Orchestra.

He eventually earned his B.A. in Music Education from the University of Akron, moved to New York City, and received an M.A. from Columbia University.

== Career and activism ==
By the early 1960s, Chandler began to get involved in the Civil Rights Movement. He sang at demonstrations and rallies and gained a reputation as a protest songwriter.

One of his most famous songs was "Beans in My Ears", which was recorded by the Serendipity Singers as well as by Pete Seeger. He also served as one of the original crew members of Seeger's CLEARWATER organization, working to save the environment around the Hudson River Valley. Pete Seeger sang one of Chandler's songs, entitled "Run Come See the Sun", at the Sanders Theater in Boston in 1980.

Chandler was also a performer in the travelling anti-war troupe F.T.A., which was organized by Jane Fonda in 1971. With Holly Near and Rita Martinson, the group toured the United States and bases throughout the Pacific Rim. Their travels were filmed; however, the documentary was pulled from theatres a week after its release due to the controversy surrounding Fonda's visit to Hanoi.

After penning topical material related to the Original Black Panther Party, Lew Irwin brought Chandler to KRLA 1110 to write three topical songs a day for their radio program, The Credibility Gap, which released some of his songs, including "Soul in Ice", on their record An Album Of Political Pornography. At KRLA, Chandler also wrote and recorded the short theme song "The Chronicles of Pop" for the Pop Chronicles radio program. In the early 1970s, he formed the Alternative Chorus-Songwriters Showcase to promote new talent. He moved to Los Angeles in the mid-1970s.

Chandler's 1964 song "Keep On Keepin' On" was used by Martin Luther King Jr. in a speech, after King's secretary saw the song in New York Broadside issue 34.

== Death and legacy ==
Len Chandler died in San Pedro, California, on August 28, 2023, at the age of 88. He was survived by his wife, Olga Adderley Chandler, widow of jazz musician Cannonball Adderley, and one son.

== Discography ==
- 1967 – To Be a Man (Columbia CS 9259)
- 1967 – The Lovin' People (Columbia CS 9553 - stereo, CL 2753 - mono)
- 1968 – An Album Of Political Pornography, with Lew Irwin and The Credibility Gap (Blue Thumb)
