= Lieder und Gesänge (Mahler) =

Collection of songs with piano accompaniment by Gustav Mahler

Lieder und Gesänge is a collection of fourteen songs with piano accompaniment by Gustav Mahler.

The title of the collection is sometimes given with the addendum aus der Jugendzeit (from the early days), but this addendum is not by Mahler. It is not even clear whether the subtitle refers to the songs being early works of Gustav Mahler (yet Mahler was aged 20 when he composed the earliest of the songs, not an adolescent), or whether the songs are meant to resemble memories of someone's younger days. The title might also simply refer to the source of the major part of the lyrics, Des Knaben Wunderhorn (The Youth's Magic Horn).

The songs were composed from 1880 to 1889 and published in three booklets in 1892.

- Vol. 1 (composed 1880/81)
1. Frühlingsmorgen - Spring morning (Richard Leander)
2. Erinnerung - Memory (Richard Leander)
3. Hans und Grete - Hans and Grethe (Gustav Mahler)
4. Serenade aus Don Juan - Serenade (Tirso de Molina)
5. Phantasie aus Don Juan - Fantasy (Tirso de Molina)
- Vol. 2 (composed 1888/89; from: Des Knaben Wunderhorn)
1. Um schlimme Kinder artig zu machen - How to make naughty children behave
2. Ich ging mit Lust durch einen grünen Wald - I walked with joy
3. Aus! Aus! - Out! Out!
4. Starke Einbildungskraft - Strong imagination
- Vol. 3 (composed 1888/89; from: Des Knaben Wunderhorn)
1. Zu Straßburg auf der Schanz' - On the ramparts at Strasbourg
2. Ablösung im Sommer - Changing of the summer relief
3. Scheiden und Meiden - Parting is painful
4. Nicht wiedersehen! - Never to meet again!
5. Selbstgefühl - Self-esteem

Together with the booklet "Sieben Lieder aus letzter Zeit" (Seven Songs of Latter Days), which consists of the five Rückert-Lieder and two of the Lieder aus "Des Knaben Wunderhorn", published in 1905, they now make up a collection known as 24 Songs by Mahler, published by International Music Company, New York, NY.

Mahler's Ablösung im Sommer song was later extensively quoted in the 3rd movement of Mahler's 3rd Symphony.

Orchestral versions of a selection of the songs were published by Luciano Berio in 1986 (Five Early Songs for Male Voice) and 1987 (Six Early Songs for Baritone and Orchestra). Orchestrations of five of the songs were also made by Colin Matthews and David Matthews in 1964. All 14 songs are now orchestrated and available for performance from Josef Weinberger Limited. The complete cycle was given its first performance by Regine Hangler (soprano) and the Warsaw Philharmonic under the baton of Jacek Kaspczyk at the Philharmonic Hall, Warsaw on 1 October 2016.
