= Rainbow Race =

Studio album by Pete Seeger
- Released: 1971
- Genre: Folk
- Length: 29:13
- Label: Columbia
- Producer: Bob Johnston

Pete Seeger chronology
Dangerous Songs!? (1966)	Rainbow Race (1971)	At 89 (2008)

Professional ratings
Review scores
Source	Rating
Allmusic	5/5 stars

Rainbow Race is the eighth studio album by Pete Seeger and was released in 1971 on the Columbia Records label. The cover photograph was by David Gahr.

== Track listing ==
All tracks are written by Pete Seeger except where noted.

No.	Title	Writer(s)	Length
1.	"Last Train to Nuremberg"		2:43
2.	"Sailing Down This Golden River"		2:36
3.	"Uncle Ho"		2:08
4.	"Snow, Snow"		2:52
5.	"My Rainbow Race"		2:55
6.	"Our Generation"		2:36
7.	"Old Devil Time"		2:31
8.	"The Clearwater"	Bud Foote	5:06
9.	"Words, Words, Words"		2:16
10.	"Hobo's Lullaby"	Goebel Reeves	3:24
