= My Rainbow Race =

Song by Pete Seeger

from the album Rainbow Race
- Released: 1973
- Recorded: 1973
- Genre: Folk
- Songwriter: Pete Seeger
- Composer: Pete Seeger

"My Rainbow Race" is an American folk and children's song. Originally released by Pete Seeger on his album Rainbow Race in 1973 with the name "My Rainbow Race".

== Norwegian translation ==
"Barn av regnbuen"

Single by Lillebjørn Nilsen

from the album Portrett
- B-side: "Alle duene"
- Released: 1973
- Recorded: 1973
- Genre: Folk
- Songwriter: Lillebjørn Nilsen (translation)
- Composer: Pete Seeger

The song was adapted into Norwegian by Lillebjørn Nilsen as "Barn av regnbuen" (which in English means "Children of the Rainbow"). It was released in 1973, and was the sixth-highest selling single in Norway that year.

=== Public mass performance during Norway terror trial ===
The song was performed by Nilsen and a crowd of more than 40,000 people in Youngstorget in Oslo and at squares across the country on April 26, 2012, as a protest against statements given in court by Anders Behring Breivik, the perpetrator of the July 22 attacks in 2011. The performance was inspired by Facebook reactions after Breivik claimed in his trial testimony that the song was an example of Marxist propaganda and that it was being used to "brainwash" Norwegian children. Organization was made at the level of Norwegian Minister of Culture, and other Ministers of Culture from Sweden, Denmark, Finland, Iceland and the Faroe Islands were also present. The song was thus performed a few days later, in the midst of the ongoing trial. In Oslo the sing-along was followed by a march up to the site of the trial, where the crowd laid down flowers. The song was performed both in Norwegian and English, and Nilsen had personally contacted Seeger, who responded with the words: "Oh me, oh my. I wish you luck."

Psychiatrist Thor Kvakkestad criticized this public outpouring of emotions during an ongoing trial and called for a focused discussion about the hate that seems to be building in the Norwegian populace. He also compared the rally to a pillory.

=== ECOSY 2012 ===
The song was performed by delegates attending the 2012 ECOSY Summer Camp held in Croatia in July and a music video on YouTube was recorded in support of the victims of the attacks in Norway.
