= Piano Quartet (Mahler) =

Musical composition by Gustav Mahler

The Piano Quartet in A minor, or more exactly the Quartet Movement for Piano, Violin, Viola and Cello in A Minor, by Gustav Mahler is the first movement to an abandoned piano quartet and the composer's sole surviving piece of instrumental chamber music.

== Background ==
Mahler began work on the Piano Quartet in A minor towards the end of his first year at the Vienna Conservatory, when he was around 15 or 16 years of age. The piece had its first performance on July 10, 1876, at the conservatory with Mahler at the piano, but it is unclear from surviving documentation whether the quartet was complete at this time. In several letters, Mahler mentions a quartet or quintet, but there is no clear reference to this piano quartet. Following this performance the work was performed at the home of Dr. Theodor Billroth, who was a close friend of Johannes Brahms. The final known performance of the Quartet in the 19th century was at Iglau on September 12, 1876, with Mahler again at the piano; it was performed along with a violin sonata by Mahler that has not survived.

It appears that at one point Mahler wished to publish the Quartet, as the surviving manuscript, which includes 24 bars of a scherzo for piano quartet written in G minor, bears the stamp of the publisher Theodor Rättig.

Following the rediscovery of the manuscript by Mahler's widow Alma Mahler in the 1960s, the work was premiered in the United States on February 12, 1964, at the Philharmonic Hall in New York City by Peter Serkin and the Galimir Quartet. Four years later it was performed in the United Kingdom on June 1, 1968, at the Purcell Room, London, by the Nemet Ensemble.

== Structure ==
The single-movement work, which is marked Nicht zu schnell (not too fast), is scored for a standard piano quartet, (piano, violin, viola, and cello) and typically takes between 10 and 15 minutes to perform.

== Modern completions ==
The existence of the 24-bar scherzo sketch (which is sometimes paired with the surviving complete movement) has resulted in attempts to complete the quartet by a number of composers. In 1988 the Russian composer Alfred Schnittke wrote a completion of this movement; he also used the fragment in the second movement of his Concerto Grosso No. 4/Symphony No. 5.

French Pianist and composer Enguerrand-Friedrich Lühl worked on completing the quartet from 1998-99. He not only realized the scherzo, but added two movements of his own in the style of Mahler to give the work a satisfying structure.

The Rotterdam Philharmonic Orchestra (RPhO) commissioned an orchestration of the quartet from the Dutch pianist and composer Marlijn Helder. It was premiered in May 2013 by the RPhO and conductor James Gaffigan. The Asian premiere was held in August 2013 with the Seoul Philharmonic Orchestra.

== In popular culture ==
The Quartet forms part of the soundtrack in Martin Scorsese's 2010 motion picture Shutter Island and is the subject of a short discussion between the movie's characters. Its complete performance by the Pražák Quartet is featured on the movie's double-CD soundtrack.
