= Don't Let the Rain Come Down (Crooked Little Man) =

Single by The Serendipity Singers

from the album The Serendipity Singers
- B-side: "Freedom's Star"
- Released: February 1964
- Recorded: 1963
- Genre: Folk, calypso
- Length: 2:43
- Label: Philips
- Songwriters: Traditional; Reissues credit Ersel Hickey, Ed E. Miller

The Serendipity Singers singles chronology
| "Don't Let the Rain Come Down (Crooked Little Man)" (1964) | "Beans in My Ears" (1964) |

"Don't Let the Rain Come Down (Crooked Little Man)" is a folk music single, and the debut recording of the Serendipity Singers in 1964. The song was based on the English nursery rhyme "There Was a Crooked Man".

The song was first recorded as "Crooked Little House" by Jimmie Rodgers in 1960, on his album At Home with Jimmie Rodgers - An Evening of Folk Songs, on which the songwriting was credited to Ersel Hickey and Ed E. Miller.

In 1964, it was recorded by the Serendipity Singers in a calypso music-based adaptation and arrangement by the group's musical director Bob Bowers, with group members Bryan Sennett and John Madden. In the midst of Beatlemania, the record reached #2 on the U.S. Adult Contemporary chart, #6 on the Billboard Hot 100, and #7 in Canada in April and May 1964. "Don't Let the Rain Come Down" (Phillips 40175) was the #1 song on the April 17, 1964 WLS Silver Dollar Survey, and also topped surveys in Louisville, Minneapolis, Pittsburgh and elsewhere. The song reached #6 on the New Zealand Lever Hit parade chart. It was released on their premiere album, The Serendipity Singers. Later reissues of the Serendipity Singers' recording credited Hickey and Miller as the song's writers. In a "My Music, Folk Rewind" video, the group's nine members appear as three groups of three, with each group singing its particular verse; all nine members sing in each repetition of the chorus.

The song was also covered by The Brothers Four on their album More Big Folk Hits; Trini Lopez on The Folk Album (1965); and Ronnie Hilton, whose version was a hit in the UK, peaking at #21 in 1964.
