= Beans in My Ears =

Folk song

Single by The Serendipity Singers
- B-side: "Sailin' Away"
- Released: 1964
- Genre: Folk
- Length: 2:10
- Label: Philips
- Songwriter(s): Len Chandler

The Serendipity Singers singles chronology
| "Down Where the Winds Blow (Chilly Winds)" (1964) | "Beans in My Ears" (1964) | "Don't Let the Rain Come Down" (1965) |

"Beans in My Ears" is a song written by Len Chandler that was a hit single in 1964 when covered by The Serendipity Singers.

== Background ==
The song was written and sung by protest singer and contributing editor to folk-centric Broadside Magazine, Len Chandler. After it became a hit for the Serendipity Singers in 1964, doctors protested that many children were actually putting beans in their ears so it was banned in some places such as Pittsburgh and Boston. Numerous public health boards reportedly blacklisted the song as well, according to Chandler. "Some television shows asked us to do something different," said Bryan Sennett of the Serendipity Singers. "Understandably so--it was dangerous. Obviously, (the song) was a statement about adults not listening to children." Pittsburgh radio station KDKA's program manager Jack Williams imposed the ban due to the number of listener complaints and doctor reports about children putting objects in their ears in the three weeks following the song's release on the station.

== Chart history ==
In the US, "Beans in My Ears" reached number 30 on the Hot 100 in June 1964.

| Chart (1964) | Peak position |
|---|---|
| U.S. Billboard Hot 100 | 30 |
| U.S. Billboard Middle-Road Singles | 5 |

== Cover versions ==
- The song was covered by Lonnie Donegan in 1964 on the Pye Records label.
- It was also covered by Pete Seeger on his 1966 album Dangerous Songs!?. Seeger's version satirically attacked Lyndon B. Johnson's involvement in the Vietnam War. In addition to Chandler's original lyrics, Seeger sang that "Mrs. Jay's little son Alby" had "beans in his ears", which, as the lyrics imply, ensures that some people do not hear what is said to them. To those opposed to continuing the Vietnam War, the phrase suggested that "Alby Jay", a loose pronunciation of Johnson's nickname "LBJ", did not listen to anti-war protests as he too had "beans in his ears".
