= Pete Remembers Woody =

Studio album by Pete Seeger
- Released: September 25, 2012
- Label: Appleseed Recordings

Pete Remembers Woody is an album by Pete Seeger of Woody Guthrie songs, released by Appleseed Recordings on September 25, 2012. The album has both spoken word and musical performances.

== Reception ==
Steve Leggett of AllMusic rated the album 3.5 out of 5 stars. Scott Bauer of the Associated Press wrote, "While the disc could have used some tasteful editing, maybe cutting down to 12 tracks instead of 16, it's a minor quibble for someone of Seeger's stature. At this point, let the guy release what he wants."
