= Des Knaben Wunderhorn (Mahler) =

Song cycle by Gustav Mahler

Des Knaben Wunderhorn (The Boy’s Magic Horn) is a series of songs with music by Gustav Mahler, set either for voice and piano, or for voice and orchestra, based on texts of German folk poems chosen from a collection of the same name assembled by Achim von Arnim and Clemens Brentano and published by them, in heavily redacted form, between 1805 and 1808.

Ten songs set for soprano or baritone and orchestra were first published by Mahler as a cycle in 1905, but in total 12 orchestral songs exist, and a similar number of songs for voice and piano.

== History of composition ==
Mahler's self-composed text for the first of his Lieder eines fahrenden Gesellen (Songs of a Travelling Journeyman, often translated as Songs of a Wayfarer; 1884–1885) is clearly based on the Wunderhorn poem "Wenn mein Schatz"; his first genuine settings of Wunderhorn texts, however, are found in the Lieder und Gesänge ('Songs and Airs'), published in 1892 and later renamed by the publisher as Lieder und Gesänge aus der Jugendzeit (Songs and Airs from Days of Youth). The nine Wunderhorn settings therein were composed between 1887 and 1890, and occupied the second and third volumes of this three-volume collection of songs for voice and piano. The titles of these nine songs (different in many cases from the titles of the original poems) are as follows:

Volume II

1. "Um schlimme Kinder artig zu machen" – To Teach Naughty Children to be Good
2. "Ich ging mit Lust durch einen grünen Wald" – I Went Happily Through a Green Wood
3. "Aus! Aus!" – Finished! Finished!
4. "Starke Einbildungskraft" – Strong Imagination

Volume III

1. "Zu Straßburg auf der Schanz" – On the Ramparts of Strasbourg
2. "Ablösung im Sommer" – The Changing of the Guard in Summer
3. "Scheiden und Meiden" – Farewell and Forgo
4. "Nicht wiedersehen!" – Never to Meet Again
5. "Selbstgefühl" – Self-assurance

Mahler began work on his next group of Wunderhorn settings in 1892. A collection of 12 of these was published in 1899, under the title Humoresken ('Humoresques'), and formed the basis of what is now known simply (and somewhat confusingly) as Mahler's 'Songs from "Des Knaben Wunderhorn"'. Whereas the songs in the Lieder und Gesänge collection were conceived for voice and piano, with no orchestral versions being produced by the composer, the Humoresken were conceived from the beginning as being for voice and orchestra, even though Mahler's first step was the production of playable and publishable voice-and-piano versions. The titles in this 1899 collection are:

1. "Der Schildwache Nachtlied" – The Sentinel's Nightsong (January–February 1892)
2. "Verlor'ne Müh" – Labour Lost (February 1892)
3. "Trost im Unglück" – Solace in Misfortune (April 1892)
4. "Wer hat dies Liedlein erdacht?" – Who Thought Up This Song? (April 1892)
5. "Das irdische Leben" – Earthly Life (after April 1892)
6. "Des Antonius von Padua Fischpredigt" – St. Anthony of Padua's Sermon to the Fish (July–August 1893)
7. "Rheinlegendchen" – Little Rhine Legend (August 1893)
8. "Lied des Verfolgten im Turm" – Song of the Persecuted in the Tower (July 1898), see: Die Gedanken sind frei
9. "Wo die schönen Trompeten blasen" – Where the Fair Trumpets Sound (July 1898)
10. "Lob des hohen Verstandes" – Praise of Lofty Intellect (June 1896)
11. "Es sungen drei Engel" – Three Angels Sang a Sweet Air (1895)
12. "Urlicht" – Primeval Light (1893)

"Urlicht" (composed ?1892, orch. July 1893) was rapidly incorporated (with expanded orchestration) into Symphony No. 2 (1888–1894) as the work's fourth movement; "Es sungen drei Engel", by contrast, was specifically composed as part of Symphony No. 3 (1893–1896): requiring a boys' chorus and a women's chorus in addition to an alto soloist, it is the only song among the twelve for which Mahler did not produce a voice-and-orchestra version and the only one which he did not first publish separately. Other songs found themselves serving symphonic ends in other ways: a voiceless version of "Des Antonius von Padua Fischpredigt" forms the basis of the scherzo in Symphony No. 2, and "Ablösung im Sommer" is adopted in the same way by Symphony No. 3.

An additional setting from this period was "Das himmlische Leben" ("Heavenly Life"), of February 1892 (orchestrated March 1892). By the year of the collection's publication (1899) this song had been reorchestrated and earmarked as the finale of the 4th Symphony (1899–1900), and thus was not published as part of the Des Knaben Wunderhorn collection, nor was it made available in a voice-and-piano version.

After 1901, "Urlicht" and "Es sungen drei Engel" were removed from the collection, and replaced in later editions by two other songs, thus restoring the total number of songs in the set to twelve. The two new songs were:

"Revelge" – Reveille (July 1899)
"Der Tamboursg'sell" – The Drummer Boy (August 1901)

Shortly after Mahler's death, the publisher (Universal Edition) replaced Mahler's own piano versions of the Wunderhorn songs by piano reductions of the orchestral versions, thus obscuring the differences in Mahler's writing for the two media. In spite of this, voice-and-piano performances, especially of the lighter songs, are frequent. The original piano versions were re-published in 1993 as part of the critical edition, edited by Renate Hilmar-Voit and Thomas Hampson.

== Arrangement for chamber ensemble ==
In 2012, Ensemble Mini commissioned (as part of its "mini-Mahler series") composer and arranger Klaus Simon to transcribe the songs for a chamber ensemble of 16 musicians, the premiere of which was performed at Berliner Philharmonie on 20 June 2012. It is also published by Universal Edition.

In 2025, a chamber version of the songs, created in Hamburg by German composer Thomas Emanuel Cornelius, was premiered on 9 October 2025 at the National Forum of Music in Wrocław (NFM Wrocław). In addition to a horn quartet (Wagner tuba and French horns), the instrumentation also includes oboe (cor anglais), clarinet (E-flat, B-flat, A, and bass clarinet), violoncello, harp, celesta, timpani, and percussion, as well as low singing voices (mezzo-soprano, bass-baritone). It is also published by Squirus Music.

== Other composers ==
Poems from the same collection have also been set as Lieder by several composers, including Mendelssohn, Schumann, Loewe, Brahms, Schoenberg, Webern, and Zemlinsky.

== Selected discography ==
For convenience, this list of recordings of Des Knaben Wunderhorn is limited to recordings that include the full collection or a majority of the full collection, either in the orchestrated or piano versions, rather than a limited number of selected songs.

=== Recordings with orchestra ===
- Maureen Forrester, Heinz Rehfuss; Symphony Orchestra of the Vienna Festival; Felix Prohaska (Vanguard Everyman Classics SRV 285 SD, 1963)
- Janet Baker, Geraint Evans; London Philharmonic Orchestra; Wyn Morris (EMI S 36380, 1966)
- Elisabeth Schwarzkopf, Dietrich Fischer-Dieskau; London Symphony Orchestra; George Szell (EMI/HMV SAN 218, 1968)
- Christa Ludwig, Walter Berry; New York Philharmonic; Leonard Bernstein (Columbia S72716, 1969)
- Jessye Norman, John Shirley-Quirk; Concertgebouw Orchestra; Bernard Haitink (Philips 9500 316, 1976)
- Eva Andor, István Gati; Budapest Symphony Orchestra; Gyorgy Lehel (Hungaroton SLPX 12043, 1980)
- Lucia Popp, Andreas Schmidt; Concertgebouw Orchestra; Leonard Bernstein (Deutsche Grammophon 289 427 302-2, 1987)
- Dietrich Fischer-Dieskau; Berlin Philharmonic; Daniel Barenboim (Sony Classical SK 44935, 1990)
- Ann Murray, Thomas Allen; London Philharmonic Orchestra; Sir Charles Mackerras (Virgin Classics 7243 5 61202 2 8, 1991)
- Iris Vermillion, Jorma Hynninen; Vienna Symphony; Eliahu Inbal (Denon CO-18018, 1997)
- Anne Sofie von Otter, Thomas Quasthoff; Berlin Philharmonic; Claudio Abbado (Deutsche Grammophon 289 459-646-2, 1999)
- Brigitte Fassbaender, Dietrich Fischer-Dieskau; Saarbrucken Radio Symphony Orchestra; Hans Zender (CPO 9994792, 2000)
- Barbara Bonney, Sara Fulgoni, Matthias Goerne, Gösta Winbergh; Royal Concertgebouw Orchestra; Riccardo Chailly (Decca 289 467-348-2, 2002)
- Magdalena Kožená, Christian Gerhaher; The Cleveland Orchestra; Pierre Boulez (Deutsche Grammophon 289 477-906-0, 2010)
- Christiane Oelze, Michael Volle; Gürzenich Orchestra Cologne; Markus Stenz (Oehms OC657, 2010)
- Sarah Connolly, Dietrich Henschel; Orchestre des Champs-Élysées; Philippe Herreweghe (harmonia mundi 2901920DI, 2011)
- Christiane Iven, Hanno Müller-Brachmann; SWR Sinfonieorchester Baden-Baden und Freiburg; Michael Gielen (Hänssler HAEN93274, 2011)
- Thomas Hampson; Wiener Virtuosen (Deutsche Grammophon 289 477-928-9, 2011)

=== Recordings of arrangements by other composers ===
- Arrangement by Klaus Simon: Selina Batliner, Yanqiao Shi, Julia Frischknecht, Simon Langenegger, Nicole Wacker, Arion Rudari, Flurina Ruoss, Yi-An Chen; HBK Chamber Orchestra; Graziella Contratto (Claves CD1921, 2019)
- Arrangement by Detlev Glanert: Dietrich Henschel; Bochumer Symphoniker, Steven Sloane (Avanti AVA10522, 2023)

=== Recordings with piano accompaniment ===
- Dietrich Fischer-Dieskau; Daniel Barenboim (HMV/EMI 1 C 165-03446/48, 1980)
- Thomas Hampson; Geoffrey Parsons (Teldec 244 923-2, 1989)
- Stephan Genz; Roger Vignoles (Hyperion CDA67645, 2008)
- Wolfgang Holzmair; Charles Spencer (Onyx ONYX4100, 2012)
- Dietrich Henschel, Boris Berezovsky (Evil Penguin EPRC013, 2013)
- Diana Damrau, Ivan Paley; Stephan Matthias Lademann (Profil Medien PH14018, 2015)
- Katharina Kammerloher, Arttu Kataja; Eric Schneider (Pianist) (MDG MDG90823226, 2024)
