= Des Knaben Wunderhorn =

1805–1808 collection of German folk songs

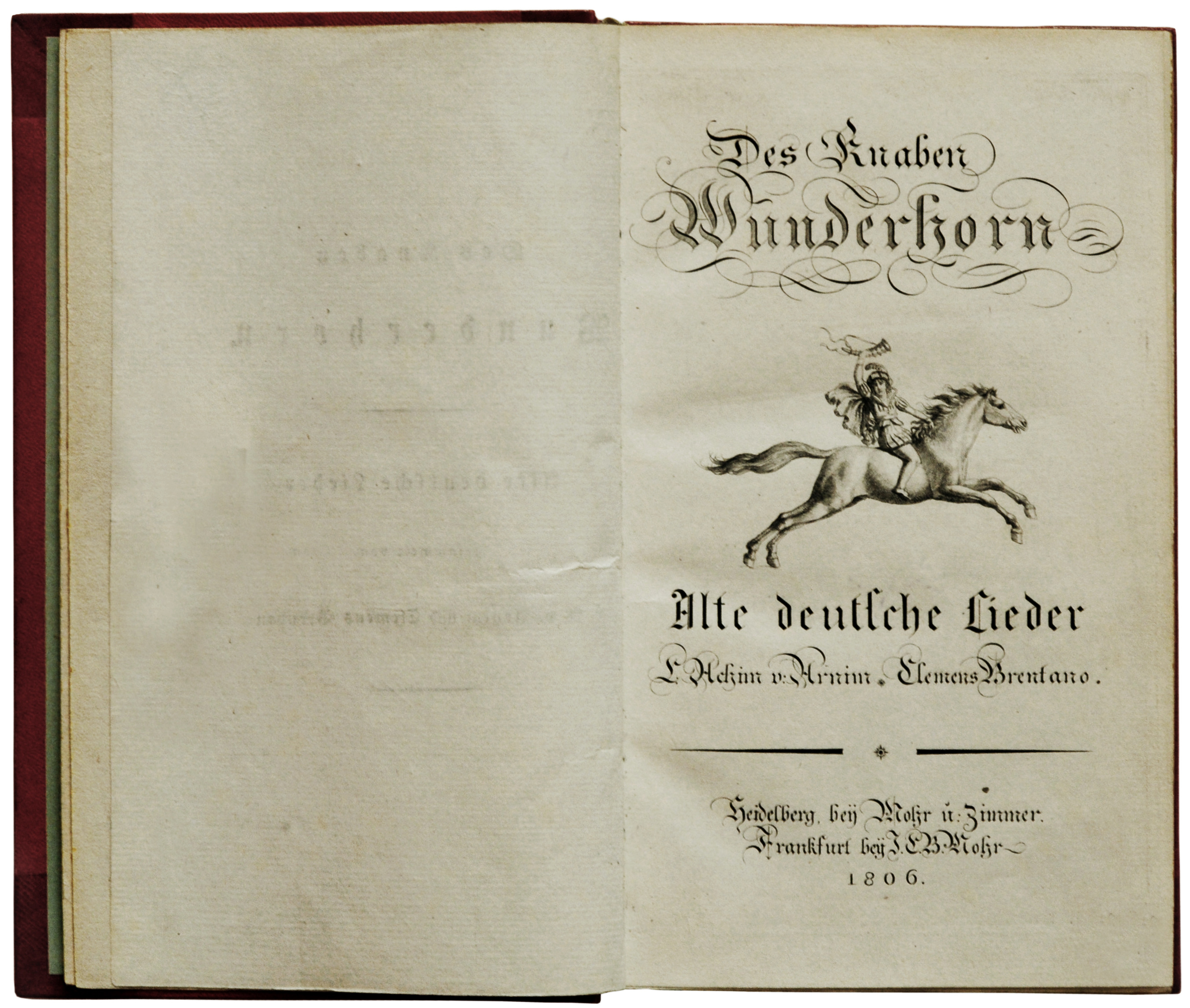
Title page of Des Knaben Wunderhorn: Alte deutsche Lieder, volume 1, published in 1806

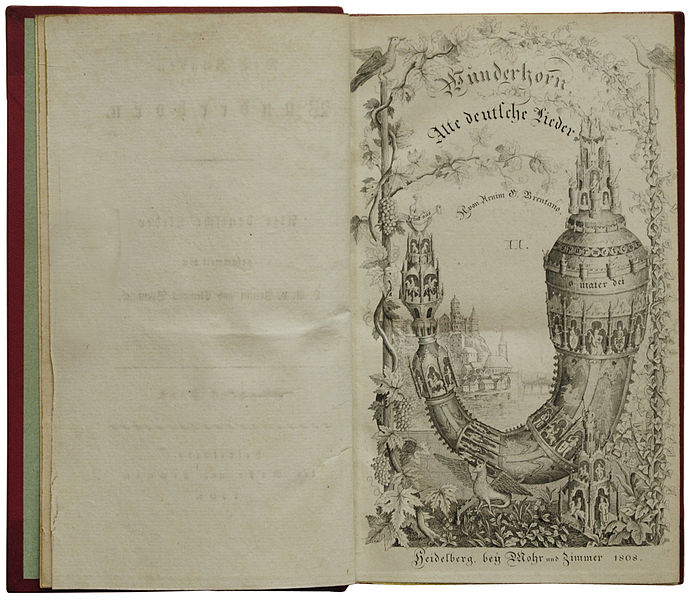
Title page, volume 2, published in 1808

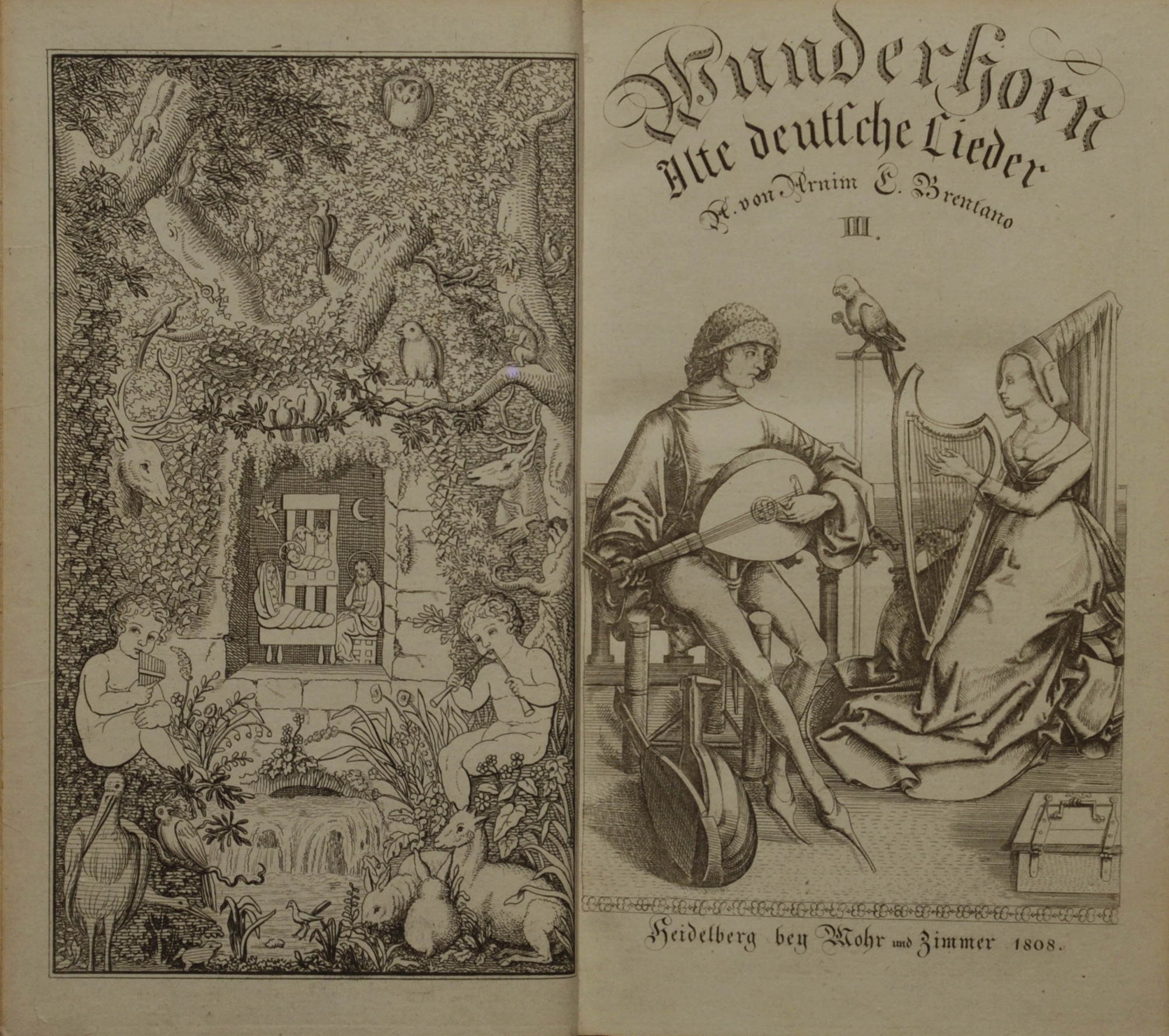
Frontispiece and title page, volume 3, published in 1808

Des Knaben Wunderhorn: Alte deutsche Lieder (German for "The boy's magic horn: old German songs") is a collection of German folk poems and songs edited by Achim von Arnim and Clemens Brentano. The book was published in three volumes, the first in 1806, followed by two more in 1808.

The collection of love, soldiers, wandering, and children's songs was an important source of idealized folklore in the Romantic nationalism of the 19th century. Des Knaben Wunderhorn became widely popular across the German-speaking world; Johann Wolfgang von Goethe, one of the most influential writers of the time, declared that Des Knaben Wunderhorn "has its place in every household".

== Cultural-historical background ==
Arnim and Brentano, like other early 19th-century song collectors, such as the Englishman Thomas Percy, freely modified the poems in their collection. The editors, both poets themselves, invented some of their own poems. Some poems were modified to fit poetic metre, to conform to then-modern German spelling, or otherwise to conform more closely to an idealized, Romantic "folk style" (Naturpoesie). A 20th-century critical edition by Heinz Rölleke describes the origin of each poem in the collection. Brentano was motivated more by writing his own material than by a strict preservation of the original folk songs.

The young proponents of Romanticism, strongly taken by national sentiments, devoted themselves to the collection and study of the origins of Germanic history in folk songs, fairy tales, myths, sagas (Nibelungenlied), and Germanic literature. Everything untouched by the negative impact of modern civilisation in their eyes, was considered good and helpful for the Gesundung der Nation (Recovery of the nation). It was under Brentano's direction that the Brothers Grimm began collecting their Grimms' Fairy Tales.

Publication of the collection took place during the War of the Fourth Coalition, in which Napoleon achieved what seemed at the time a decisive military victory and established a complete French dominance over Germany. Thus, the aspiration for "Recovery of the nation" had a very clear and concrete political aspect.

== In music ==
Selected poems from this collection have been set to music (Lieder) by a number of composers, including Weber, Schubert, Loewe, Mendelssohn, Schumann, Brahms, Zemlinsky, Schoenberg, Zeisl and Webern.

Gustav Mahler numbered the collection among his favourite books and set its poems to music throughout much of his life. The text of the first of his four Lieder eines fahrenden Gesellen, begun in 1884, is based directly on the Wunderhorn poem "Wann mein Schatz", using text from the first two stanzas. Between 1887 and 1901, he wrote two dozen music settings for Wunderhorn texts, several of which were incorporated into (or composed as movements for) his Second, Third and Fourth symphonies. In 1899, he published a collection of a dozen Wunderhorn settings that has since become known, slightly confusingly, as Songs from Des Knaben Wunderhorn.

== See also ==
- Category:Songs from Des Knaben Wunderhorn
- Category:Music based on Des Knaben Wunderhorn
