= The Serendipity Singers =

1960s folk group

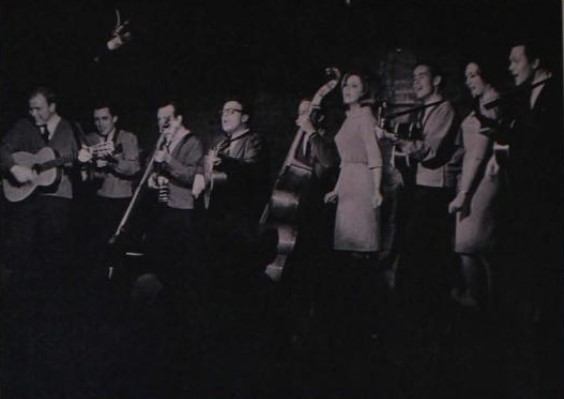
- 1964

Background information
- Also known as: Newport Singers
- Genres: Folk
- Labels: Philips; United Artists; Empire
- Past members: Mike Brovsky; Brooks Hatch; John Madden; Jon Arbenz; Bob Young; Lynne Weintraub; Bryan Sennett; Diane Decker; Tom Tiemann; Gerry Barnas; Gamble Rogers; Rennie Temple; John Bennett Perry; Lenny Roberts

The Serendipity Singers were a 1960s American folk group, similar to The New Christy Minstrels. Their debut single "Don't Let the Rain Come Down (Crooked Little Man)" was a Top Ten hit and received the group's only Grammy nomination in 1965. The majority of the group's recording sales took place in a two-year period of 1964 and 1965. The group's name was sold in the 1970s resulting in entirely new lineups of group members performing under the name The Serendipity Singers into the early 21st Century.

== History ==
=== As The Newport Singers ===
This nine-member folk-oriented group started at the University of Colorado with seven original members of a group called the Newport Singers. The members - Bryan Sennett (14 March 1940 - 7 September 2011), Brooks Hatch, Mike Brovsky, John Madden, Jon Arbenz (1 June 1940 - 1 February 2012), Bob Young (12 March 1939 - 16 September 2006) and Lynne Weintraub - had, with the exception of Weintraub, all previously worked together in various trios before coming together to form the Newport Singers.

In 1963, after working extensively in the Rocky Mountain Denver-Boulder Front Range region, the Newport Singers moved to New York City based on a telegram offering a record contract from a William Morris agent. Fred Weintraub (no relation to Lynne), then-owner of the Bitter End in Greenwich Village, agreed to manage the group. Weintraub, also at the time the talent co-coordinator for the popular ABC Hootenanny television series, felt the group needed two more people to round out the sound. He invited Tom Tiemann and Diane Decker, two University of Texas students whom he had heard, to New York for an audition.

=== As The Serendipity Singers ===
Fred Weintraub proposed the name change from the Newport Singers to Serendipity in part because there was another performing act using the Newport name. After some considerable discussion, a compromise was reached, and they became the Serendipity Singers. After several months of rehearsal and work with Bob Bowers who became the group’s musical director, the Serendipity Singers opened at Weintraub's Bitter End café. They played in Greenwich Village with 90% original songs and were signed to six appearances on the weekly Hootenanny show during the fall of 1963. The success of the television exposure helped the band land its first record contract.

=== The Philips Records years (1964–1966) ===
Philips Records signed them in 1964 and released their debut album to considerable sales success. Entering the Hot 100 at #90 on February 29, 1964, the debut single "Don't Let the Rain Come Down (Crooked Little Man)" climbed to #6 on 2–9 May 1964 and also hit #2 on the U.S. Adult Contemporary chart, right in the middle of Beatlemania. The song was nominated for a Grammy at the 7th Grammy Awards (their only Grammy nomination) in 1965 for Best Performance by a Chorus though losing to The Swingle Singers who won for "Going Baroque." The follow-up, "Beans in My Ears", hit #30 on the Hot 100 and #5 on the AC chart a few months later. "Beans in My Ears" was banned in Boston, by Pittsburgh's KDKA radio station, and "some television shows asked us to do something different. Understandably so--it was dangerous," according to Bryan Sennett. "Obviously, (the song) was a statement about adults not listening to children." The singers were told not to perform the song on their appearance on The Ed Sullivan Show, December 27, 1964; they performed "Movin' in My Heart." The group also released a French language extended play record entitled, "Chantent en Français," that included a French version of the Beatles song, "And I Love Her".

They released six albums on the Philips label before the end of 1965 and promoted their music on television shows including Hollywood A Go-Go, The Dean Martin Show, The Tonight Show Starring Johnny Carson, and Shindig! Their initial success, however, was dampened by the continuing impact of the British Invasion, and within just two years the group's sound seemed dated to younger audiences and sales of successive albums decreased. The group featured line-up changes as original members departed. First to leave in 1965 was Lynne Weintraub who was replaced by Patti Davis after an audition process which drew more than 1,500 female singers. Tom Tieman, the tenor, was next to leave, replaced by John Bennett (J.B.) Perry. Shortly thereafter Brooks Hatch departed to be replaced by Perry's brother, Tony Perry. Gamble Rogers would join the band later in 1966 and, in 1967, John Madden left for law school and, earlier in '66, both Diane Decker and Patti Davis left and were replaced by Lana Shaw and JoAnne. With the new line-up, the group's final three singles for the Philips label each released in 1966 failed to chart and the group and Philips parted ways.

Despite having no new albums in 1966 and 1967, the group extensively played the college circuit and did appear on television including WABC's syndicated series "An Evening With" on May 21, 1966 and a return to The Ed Sullivan Show on January 8, 1967 where they sang, "If I Were a Carpenter" and a medley of folk tunes. They also performed the soundtrack recording for a film spotlighting Lady Bird Johnson's beautification program singing, "We're On Our Way" which was played in movie theaters and television in 1967. The band's connection with the Johnsons had included a White House appearance performing with President Lyndon B. Johnson in attendance and performing at the 1964 Democratic National Convention.

=== The U.A. Records years (1967–1969) ===
Moving to the United Artists Records label in 1967, the group minus a number of its original members and the departed Gamble Rogers recorded two vocal tracks associated with the United Artists film, Hawaii, and released as a single which failed to chart. They also appeared on the soundtrack for the U.A. film, The Way West, including the title track released as a single which didn't chart and one LP in 1968, which was the Serendipity Singers' final album to feature original members of the group. That album, "Love is a State of Mind," was a departure from the traditional folk sound. "Pure folk music is dying," said album producer and group leader Mike Brovsky. "We tried a few songs with an electric guitar and they went over so well that we naturally began to do more and more." It spawned two singles, "Rain Doll" and "The Boat I Row" which - along with the LP—did not chart.

In 1968, United Artists released the single, "What Will We Do With the Child" with Nick Holmes which did not chart though Holmes would go on to record a solo album with U.A. The band appeared in four holiday syndicated television specials by Trans-Lux presented for Memorial Day, Independence Day, Halloween, and Christmas of 1968. The group's final special in that series was a one-hour syndicated television show produced by Weintraub, "Christmas at F.A.O. Schwarz" featuring the Serendipity Singers singing Christmas tunes and also starring Chuck McCann and the Paul Ashley puppets. The special was rebroadcast in Christmas of 1969 and 1970 by multiple U.S. television stations.

In 1969, the band without chart success continued touring and making television appearances including their final Ed Sullivan guest spot on June 8, 1969. The group's final single for U.A. "Come Softly to Me" was released in 1969. The single didn't chart and the group failed to get its second full-length album released by U.A. effectively ending the commercial recording career of the original band. After touring 49 of the 50 United States and 15 foreign countries, selling over five million records, the founding members had left the group by 1970.

=== 1970–2013 ===
Though the original members had departed, modified line-ups of singers performing as the Serendipity Singers continued touring continuously from the 1970s and into the 2000s. The 1970 lineup featured Bernadette Carroll, formerly of The Angels; Rennie Temple, Tony Perry, John Perry, Matthew Perry, Peggy Santiglia and Brovsky handling management of the group. The group name was purchased by David Stanton of Theatrical Corporation of America, a company that primarily booked talent on the college circuit. Stanton, who as manager organized a second band by the same name in 1971. This group toured Europe on a USO contract. Those members were from the San Francisco and peninsula Bay Area and were Karen Stanton, Stuart MacGregor, David Kazanjian, John MacNiel, Connie Nilson, David Reign from Oakland and Mike White from Piedmont California. This same group performed the national anthem for the Oakland A's and toured in Los Angeles for many fund raisers and celebrities.

Stanton placed the first line-up in five syndicated television specials in 1974 and had two original albums on his label Empire Records. The first album, "The Serendipity Singers Play the Palace" featured highlights from one of the television specials recorded live in San Francisco. The second album was also from a TV special, "Musical Postcard From Vail." Both albums were primarily sold at the group's live appearances. The group was featured in a 1979 White Castle television commercial which included: John Ross, Laura McKenzie, Carol Murphy, Bartha Hartman, Daryl Best and Gerry Barnas. A tour called "Vaudeville '80" packaged by Roy Radin featured the group with six other acts including The Ink Spots, The Drifters, Tiny Tim, and The Marvelettes and drew small crowds. In 1986, Stanton directed and produced one season of the syndicated, The Serendipity Singers Show starring Laura McKenzie. The group starred in a 1986 video release, The Serendipity Singers: An American Family Christmas released by Republic Pictures Home Video. Stanton also directed a film in 1987 starring the singers entitled, America: The Great Mississippi written and starring McKenzie along with group members Andy Huppert, John Ross, Jodie Scott, and Holley Setlock. Also featured in the film were Charley Pride and B.J. Thomas. The group appeared in four syndicated television specials in 1989 and 1990, including two Christmas specials and an Easter special. The Christmas special was released by Fries Entertainment as a VHS tape in 1990, A Christmas Celebration with the Serendipity Singers.

In 1999, the Serendipity Singers' original members were scheduled to reunite for a concert for the first time since 1966 at Branson, Missouri's Celebrity Theater as part of the Fifth Annual Cruisin' Branson Lights Festival. The appearance was just one month after the re-release of its first two albums on CD on the Collectables label. The group's style, if not also its reunion, was thought to be an influence in the folk music parody film, A Mighty Wind, with one author suggesting that a song in the film by the New Main Street Singers, "Fare Away" may be an homage to the Serendipity Singers' "Sailin' Away." A number of the band members reunited again for the 2003 PBS special and DVD release of "This Land is Our Land: The Pop-Folk Years." Billed as A Serendipitous Reunion, the group sang, "Don't Let the Rain Come Down," "Down Where the Winds Blow," and "Waggoner Lad."

The Serendipity Singers were inducted into the Colorado Music Hall of Fame in 2013. They reunited to perform at the induction event also honoring Judy Collins, Bob Lind and Chris Daniels on November 8, 2013 at Denver's Paramount Theater. Their only album for United Artists, 1968's Love is a State of Mind, was reissued on compact disc for the first time in September 2013 by Now Sounds Records.

== Discography ==
=== Albums and EPs ===
- The Serendipity Singers (Philips, 1964) U.S. #11
- The Many Sides of the Serendipity Singers (Philips, 1964) U.S. #68
- Take Your Shoes Off with the Serendipity Singers (Philips, 1965) U.S. #149
- We Belong Together (Philips, 1965) also released as the promotional edition, "The Serendipity Singers Bowl 'Em Over" (Philips, 1965)
- The Serendipity Singers Sing of Love, Lies, and Flying Festoons .... and other songs by Shel Silversteen (Philips, 1965)
- The Serendipity Singers on Tour (Philips, 1965)
- The Serendipity Singers Chantent en Français (EP Philips, 1965)
- The Way West (United Artists Soundtrack, 1967) featuring The Serendipity Singers
- Love Is a State of Mind (United Artists, 1968)
- The Serendipity Singers Play the Palace (Empire Records, 1974)
- Musical Postcard From Vail (Empire Records, 1974)

=== Charted singles ===
- "Don't Let the Rain Come Down (Crooked Little Man)" (Philips, Feb. 1964) #6, #7 Canada
- "Beans in My Ears" (Philips, May 1964) #30
- "Down Where the Winds Blow (Chilly Winds)" (Philips, Aug. 1964) #112
- "Little Brown Jug" (Philips, Jan. 1965) #124
- "Plastic" (Philips, Dec. 1965) #118
