= Seeger =

Origin
- Language: Middle English

Other names
- Variant form: Seagar

Seeger is an English surname.

== Etymology ==
Seeger is one of the variant forms of Seagar, a surname of Middle English origin based on the given name Segar, which was formed from Old English sæ ("sea") and gar ("spear").

== Seeger family of musicians ==
- Charles Louis Seeger, Sr. (1860–1943), American businessman, father of the musicologist
- Charles Louis Seeger, Jr. (1886–1979), American musicologist, composer, and teacher; brother of Alan and Elizabeth Seeger; husband of Ruth Crawford Seeger; father of Pete, Peggy, and Mike Seeger
- Alan Seeger (1888–1916), American poet
- Elizabeth Seeger (1889–1973), teacher at Dalton School and author
- Ruth Crawford Seeger (1901–1953), a modernist composer and an American folk music specialist
- Pete Seeger (1919–2014), preeminent American folk and protest singer of the 20th century
- Toshi Seeger (1922–2013), filmmaker and environmental activist, wife of Pete
- Mike Seeger (1933–2009), American folk musician and folklorist
- Peggy Seeger (born 1935), American folk singer and songwriter; wife of Scottish folk singer Ewan MacColl and stepmother of singer Kirsty MacColl
- Mika Seeger, American ceramic artist, daughter of Pete and Toshi
- Tao Rodríguez-Seeger (b. 1972), a contemporary American folk musician, grandchild of Pete and Toshi

== Others ==
- Al Seeger (b. 1980), American boxer
- Alois Seeger (1868–1931), mayor of Vaduz, Liechtenstein
- Andreas Seeger, German mathematician
- Britta Seeger (b. 1969), German business executive
- Charles M. Seeger (b. 1948), American author and attorney
- Daniel Seeger (b. 1934), defendant in a case on conscription of pacifists
- Frank Seeger (b. 1972), German sports shooter
- Fritz Seeger (b. 1912), Swiss sprinter
- Hal Seeger (1917–2005), American animated cartoon producer and director
- Harald Seeger (1922–2015), German footballer and manager
- Helmut Seeger (b. 1932), German sports shooter
- Hermann Seeger (1857–1945), German painter
- Louis Seeger (1798–1865), German equestrian
- Matthew Seeger (b. 1957), American professor and university dean
- Melanie Seeger (b. 1977), German race walker
- Petra Seeger, German documentary film director and producer
- Raymond Seeger (1906–1992), American physicist
- Ruth Taubert Seeger (1924–2014), American athlete and coach
- Stanley J. Seeger (1930–2011), American art collector
- Stefan Seeger (born 1962), German chemist and professor
- Steven C. Seeger (b. 1971), American judge

== See also ==
- Seeger Memorial Junior-Senior High School, West Lebanon, Indiana
- Seeger ring, alternative name for a circlip
- Seger
- Segger (surname)
- United States v. Seeger, regarding Daniel Seeger's conscription
