= Seager =

Seager is a surname, and may refer to:

- Alexandra Seager (1870–1950), businesswoman and philanthropist in South Australia
- Allan Seager (1906–1968), American novelist and short-story writer
- Charles Allen Seager (1872–1948), Anglican Bishop of Ontario
- Christopher Seager (b. 1951), Zimbabwean cricketer
- Corey Seager (b. 1994), American baseball player with the Texas Rangers
- Edward Seager (British Army officer) (1812–1883), British Army officer in the Crimean War and the Indian Mutiny
- Esther Seager (1835–1911), New Zealand prison and asylum matron
- Gavin Seager (b. 1978), stock car racing driver
- Henry Rogers Seager (1870–1930) – American economist
- Kyle Seager (b. 1987), American baseball third baseman
- Leighton Seager, 1st Baron Leighton of St Mellons (1896–1963), Welsh shipping magnate
- Michael Seager (b. 1947), Zimbabwean cricketer
- Ryan Seager (b. 1996), English professional footballer who plays as a forward
- Samantha Seager (b. 1974), British actress in soap opera Coronation Street
- Sara Seager (b. 1971), Canadian-American astronomer and planetary scientist and textbook writer
- Sarah Seager (b. 1958), American conceptual artist
- Spencer L. Seager, American Professor of Chemistry
- William Henry Seager (1862–1941), Welsh shipping magnate and Liberal Party politician

== See also ==
- Seagar
- Seeger
- Seger
