= Goldpfeil =

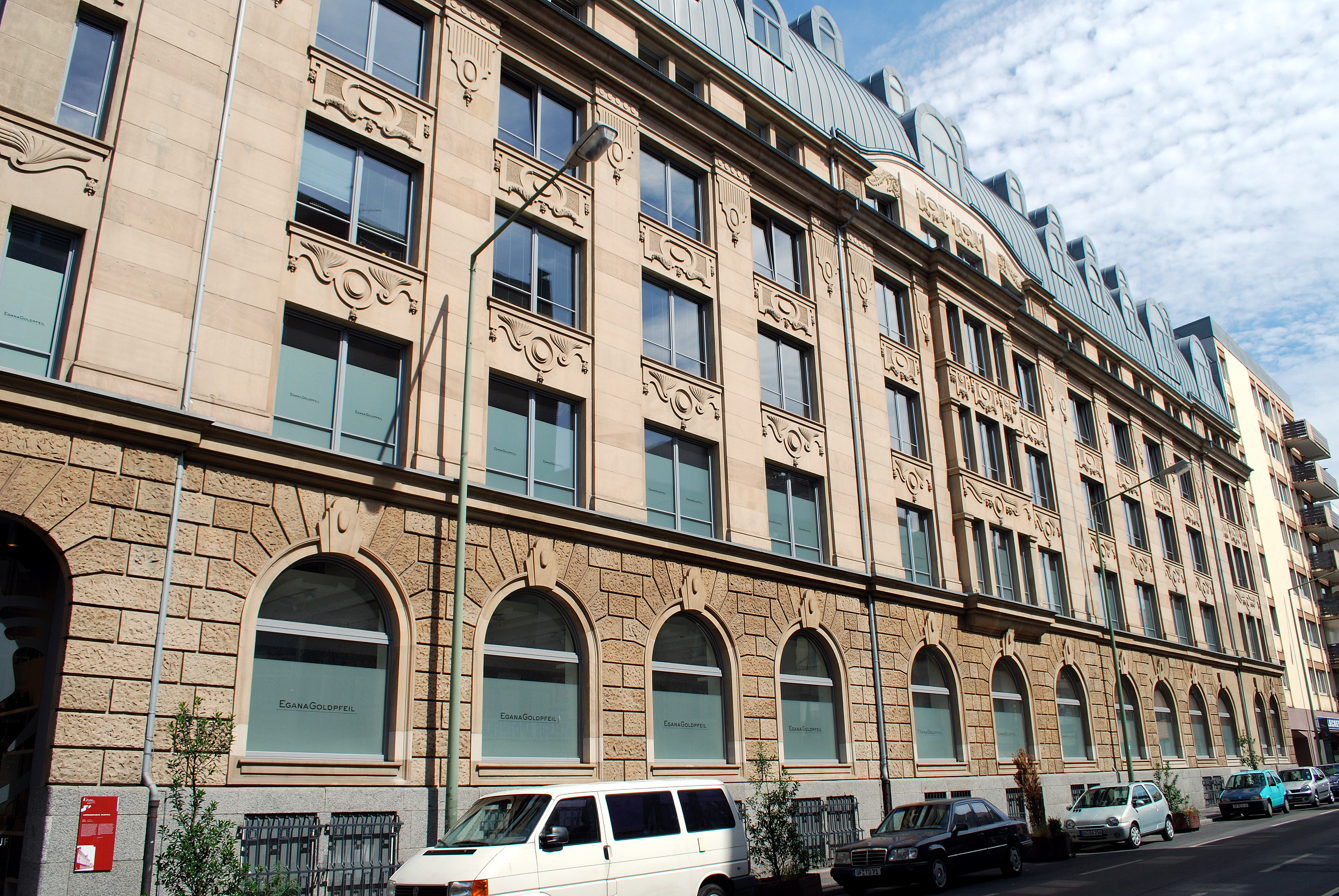
The Headquarters built in 1913

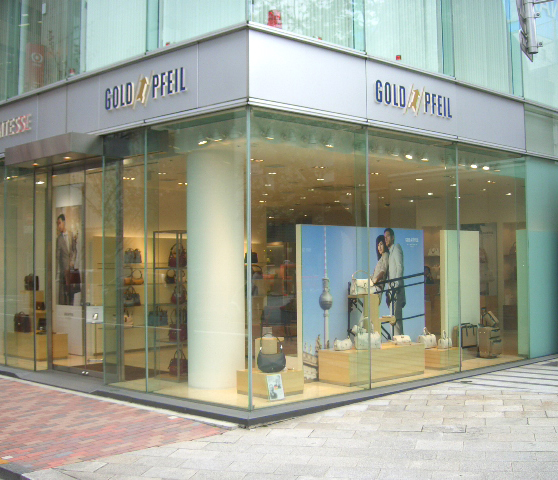
The Goldpfeil boutique in Tokyo

Goldpfeil (Ludwig Krumm AG) was a German luxury label founded in 1856 in Offenbach am Main.

== History ==
Founded in 1856 in Offenbach, Germany, considered to be the "leather capital of Germany" since the mid-1800s and has been the head office to other coveted German brands such as Seeger (founded in 1889) and Mädler (founded in 1850). Seeger was merged into Montblanc and the companies were both part of the same company for several years.

The last of "the big four" premium leather goods producers in Germany, Montblanc was founded in 1906. Although Montblanc's headquarters are located in Hamburg, their leather goods factory was located in Offenbach until late 2009 when production was moved to Hamburg and Florence, Italy. A group of former Montblanc and Seeger executives and craftworkers maintains production through a spinoff of Seeger.

Founded by Ludwig Krumm in 1856, the original name of Goldpfeil was Ludwig Krumm AG. Krumm's strategy right from the beginning was to concentrate on producing leather goods of the highest quality. Within twenty five years around 200 employees were working for the company due to the increasing demand from the British market and the Russian upper class, as well as in many of the countries in mainland Europe. In 1929 Heinrich Krumm, traveled on the luxury train named Golden Arrow in London, England. So impressed by the quality of service, Herr Krumm simply translated "Gold Arrow" into German and renamed his company Goldpfeil.

The company delivered its goods to more than 56 countries in the 1930s and shops like Macy's and Saks Fifth Avenue in the USA offered Goldpfeil's leather bags and accessories as early as 1912. By the 1950s Goldpfeil had achieved the status worldwide of being among the world's elite leather goods producers, alongside brands such as Louis Vuitton and Chanel. In 1956, French designer Christian Dior entered into a licensing agreement with Goldpfeil to produce all of the Christian Dior handbags.

Goldpfeil operated its own boutiques in virtually every major city in Germany as well as in many countries around the world. Beginning in 1984 Goldpfeil opened ten Goldpfeil Shops in the US, including stores on Fifth Avenue in New York, on Rodeo Drive in Beverly Hills, California; Bal Harbor, Florida; Honolulu, Hawaii and Dallas, Texas. There even was a Goldpfeil Shop on the island of Guam in the Western Pacific.

Since 1998 the company expanded and became part of the Egana Goldpfeil Group which included premium luxury brands such as Joop and Comtesse and Salamander Shoes, the largest shoe company in Germany. Goldpfeil was also involved in a venture into the ultra premium watch business in Switzerland called Goldpfeil Geneve. Goldpfeil commissioned some of the finest watch makers in Switzerland to create their own unique designs for limited-production Goldpfeil watches. In Europe, Goldpfeil's leather bags and accessories were sold through Goldpfeil shops which were located in major cities throughout Germany including Frankfurt, Berlin and Munich. There also was a Goldpfeil shop in Paris, France. In the Asian market, there still are Goldpfeil Shops in Tokyo, Japan as well as Hong Kong.

In December 2008 the parent corporation Egana Goldpfeil and all related companies of Egana Goldpfeil went into receivership. Under the direction of court appointed receivers, all of the companies under the Egana Goldpfeil umbrella were sold off to independent buyers.

== Goldpfeil in North America ==
Shortly after Goldpfeil went into receivership, Andreas Mann, the sales director of Goldpfeil at their head office in Offenbach contacted long-time Goldpfeil collector Eric Calladine of Toronto, Canada and offered him the last remaining stock of original Goldpfeil products which were handmade in Germany at the direction of the receivers who were handling the bankruptcy of the company as directed by the courts. Mr. Calladine purchased all the remaining inventory of first-grade brand-new original Goldpfeil products. He sold goods from this inventory on eBay under the name “The Goldpfeil Shop” until pausing his shop in 2021.

== Goldpfeil in Asia ==
In 2009, Prairie Shimizu Co. Ltd. in Tokyo, Japan acquired the trademark for the Goldpfeil brand in Japan, China, South Korea, and Southeast Asia, and established Goldpfeil International Co. Ltd. New products are available in their shops and on eBay. However these are not made in Germany but in China. This is deceiving as since 1856 Goldpfeil built the brand as a product handmade in Germany using German leather with trained German craftsmen. This Asian product is made in China and is Goldpfeil in name only.
