= Klauser =

Klauser may refer to:

Surname

- Bartz Klauser, a fictional character and protagonist of the Japanese video game Final Fantasy V
- Ernst Klauser (born 1934), Swiss football striker
- Judy Klauser (born 1941), American gymnast
- René Klauser (1929–2018), Swiss football defender
- Thomas Klauser (born 1964), German ski jumper

Other

- St. Klauser or Rothklauser, one of numerous synonyms for the aromatic wine grape variety, Gewürztraminer
- Klauser Schuhe, a German shoe company
