= Everything Changes =

Everything Changes may refer to:

- "Everything Changes" (Torchwood), the first episode of the British science-fiction series Torchwood
- Everything Changes (Julian Lennon album), 2011
- Everything Changes (Take That album), 1993
  - "Everything Changes" (Take That song), the title track
- Everything Changes (Peggy Seeger album), 2014
- "Everything Changes" (Markus Fagervall song)
- "Everything Changes", a song by Little Big Town from Little Big Town
- "Everything Changes", a song from Pokémon 2.B.A. Master
- "Everything Changes", a song by Kathy Troccoli from Pure Attraction
- "Everything Changes", a song by Scatman John from Scatman's World
- "Everything Changes" (Staind song), 2006
