= Clearwater Festival =

Music and environmental summer festival in New York

- Genre: Jam band, rock, jazz, blues, folk
- Dates: June 17–18, 2017
- Locations: Croton Point Park, Croton-on-Hudson, New York, United States
- Coordinates: 41°10′56″N 73°53′35″W
- Years active: 1966–present
- Founders: Toshi and Pete Seeger
- Website: clearwaterfestival.org

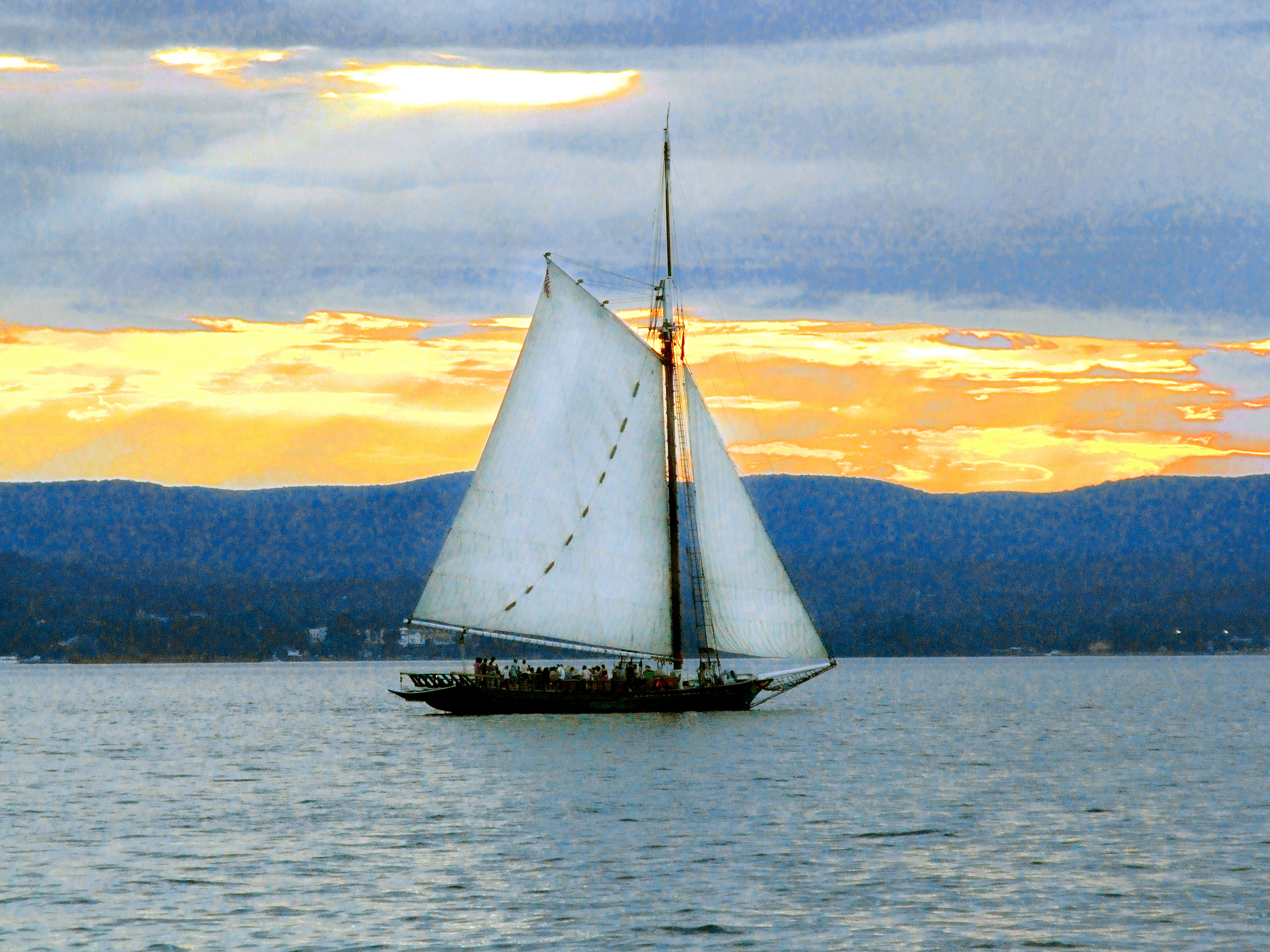
Sloop Clearwater

The Clearwater Festival (officially the Great Hudson River Revival) is a music and environmental summer festival. It is America's oldest and largest annual festival of its kind. All proceeds benefit Hudson River Sloop Clearwater, Inc., a 501(c)(3) nonprofit environmental organization.

The festival, a celebration for the Hudson River, features singer-songwriters, performers and musicians offering a diverse mix of contemporary, traditional and American Roots music, dance, family-oriented entertainment and storytelling. In addition to music and dance, a juried craft show, Green Living Expo, working waterfront, environmental education sites, and a "circle of song" featuring audience participation fill out the weekend's schedule.

All behind-the-scenes elements, such as the seven sustainable biodiesel-powered stages, recycling of food waste, volunteer meal preparation, and sponsor selection, are done with goals of sustainability and social responsibility in mind. Use of carpooling, bicycling, and public transportation are encouraged. The festival is wheelchair-accessible and staffed with American Sign Language interpreters. Clearwater was one of the first festivals to provide ASL interpreters, with 16 working at the 2011 event. The festival also includes services for disabled people, including 20 on-site wheelchairs and seating in front of every stage.

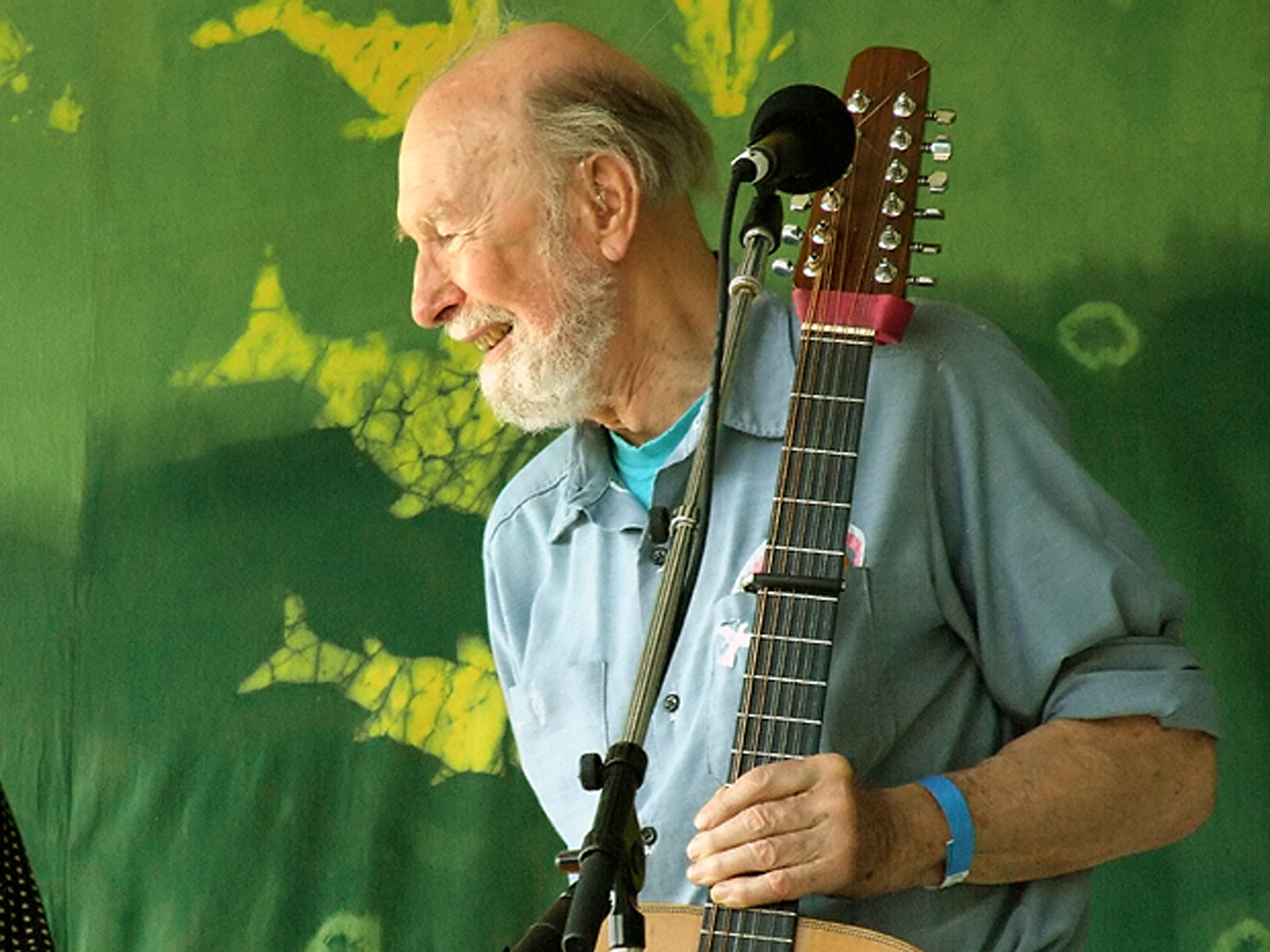
Pete Seeger at the 2007 Clearwater Festival

The festival was founded in 1966 by Toshi Seeger and her husband, folk singer Pete Seeger, who regularly performed at it. Among those who have performed over the years are Janis Ian, Arlo Guthrie, Tom Paxton, Michelle Shocked, Tish Hinojosa, Dizzy Gillespie, Paul Winter, Odetta, Buffy Sainte-Marie, Dar Williams, The Skatalites, Ani DiFranco, Taj Mahal, Alhaji Bai Konte, Toshi Reagon, Christine Lavin, Steve Earle, Shawn Colvin, Joan Osborne, Railroad Earth, Donna the Buffalo, Buckwheat Zydeco, Jonatha Brooke, Drive-By Truckers, Indigo Girls, Josh Ritter, Suzanne Vega, Tom Chapin, The Chapin Sisters, Jorma Kaukonen, Billy Bragg, David Bromberg, Peter Yarrow, The Low Anthem, The Felice Brothers, Steve Earle and Friends, Lucius, Punch Brothers, Toubab Krewe, the Foremen, Preservation Hall Jazz Band, Madison Cunningham, and Justin Townes Earle.

In 2009, the festival celebrated several anniversaries, including the 40th anniversary of the launch of the sloop Clearwater, the 90th birthday of Pete Seeger and the 400th anniversary of Henry Hudson’s voyage up the river on the Half Moon. Festival performers included some longtime folk-centric Clearwater traditions as well as many new artists who made their first appearance at the festival. First-timers in 2009 included veteran vocal group The Persuasions, Grace Potter & The Nocturnals, psychedelic rock band Dr. Dog, Elvis Perkins in Dearland and A.C. Newman, as well as singer-songwriters Alejandro Escovedo and Allison Moorer, plus bluegrass/jam band acts Old Crow Medicine Show and Cornmeal, and the festival's first hip-hop act ReadNex Poetry Squad.

Emphasizing the importance of the Hudson River to the festival, Hudson River Sloop Clearwater added a number of river front activities such as kayaking and rowboating, and rides on the tall ships Clearwater, Mystic Whaler, and Woody Guthrie.

== History of the festival ==
The festival was founded in the wake of the Storm King Mountain controversy that focused on the Hudson River from 1963 to 1982. The Festival has also had its origins in the Sloop Clearwater itself. To raise money to build the Sloop, Hudson River Sloop Clearwater founders Pete Seeger and friends held a series of small fundraising concerts in the Hudson River Valley and at Sandy Hook in New Jersey, and passed a banjo around the crowd to collect donations. By 1978, the concerts had evolved into a land-based Festival at Croton Point Park, which hosted the Festival for a decade, until pollution problems from the park's landfill forced a relocation to a suburban college campus. It was not until 1999 that the Festival was able to move back to the park and the shores of the Hudson River.

The 2016 festival, which would have been the 50th anniversary of the festival, was canceled so that resources could be directed to a substantial restoration of the sloop Clearwater. The festival returned in 2017. In 2022, the Clearwater Board President, Steve Stanne, announced that the festival could not be held in 2022, but that the board was working toward a "re-envisioned festival" in 2023.

== Mission of the festival ==
The Great Hudson River Revival is produced by Hudson River Sloop Clearwater, Inc., a nonprofit, member-supported, environmental organization, to raise funds and consciousness on the plight of the river and the earth, as well as uniting the community around the river. All proceeds go directly to support Clearwater's environmental research, education, and advocacy to help preserve and protect the river and its tributaries, as well as communities in the river valley.

== 2019 festival and final production ==
The 2019 Clearwater Festival, held on June 15–16 at Croton Point Park in Croton-on-Hudson, New York, celebrated the 100th anniversary of Pete Seeger’s birth and the 50th anniversary of the sloop *Clearwater*. The festival was produced and directed by Jason Samel, a former Clearwater board member, event producer, and founder of Movement Music Records. Prior to the 2019 festival, Samel produced Seeger Fest (2014), a five-day celebration of the lives of Pete and Toshi Seeger held in multiple New York venues, and the Glen Cove Folk Festival (2017) in Long Island, New York.
