= Lego-Brücke =

Bridge painted to look like Lego in Wuppertal, Germany

Coordinates: 51°16′03.1″N 7°09′38.8″E

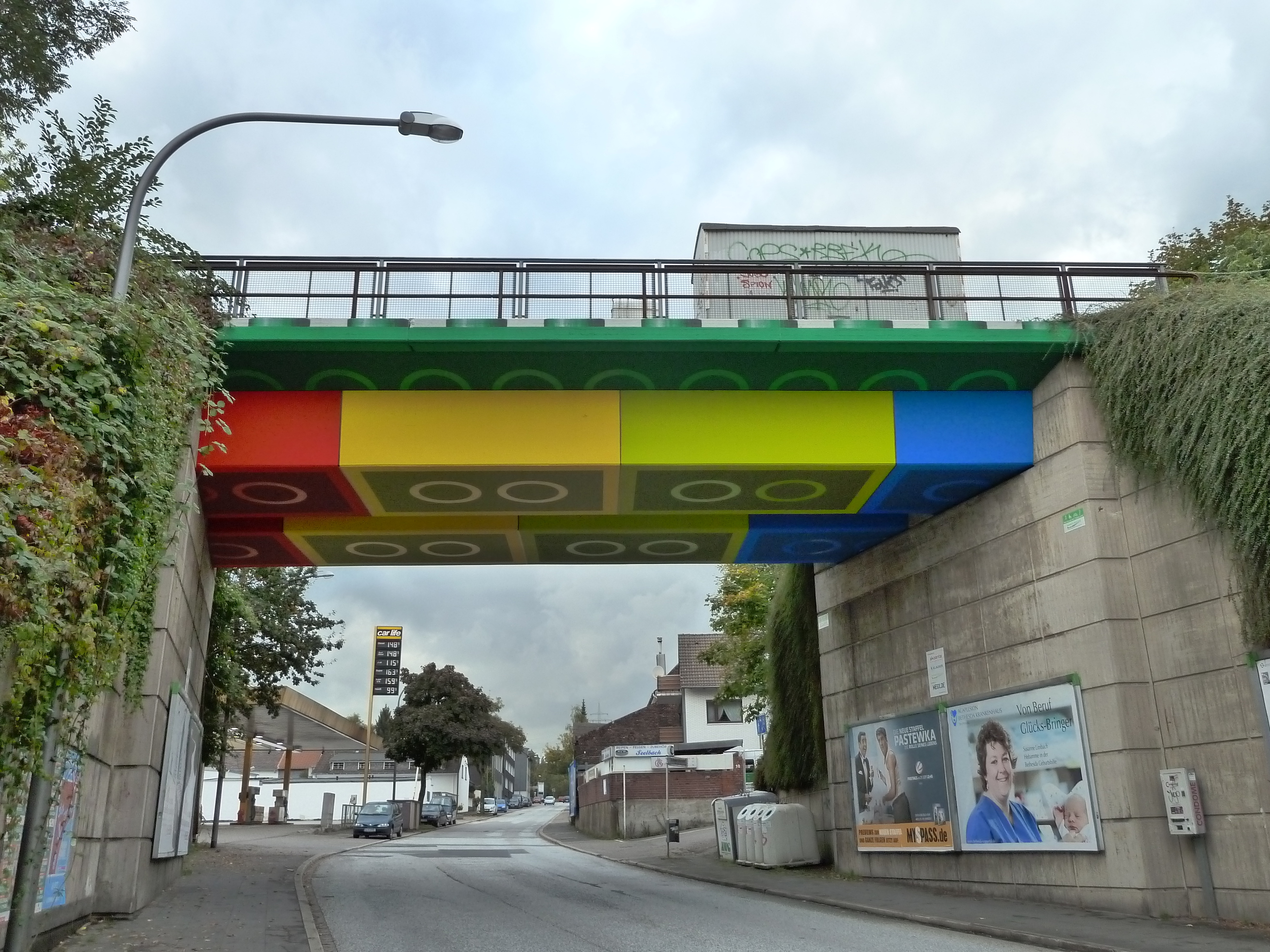
The Lego-Brücke (Lego Bridge) of Wuppertal, Germany

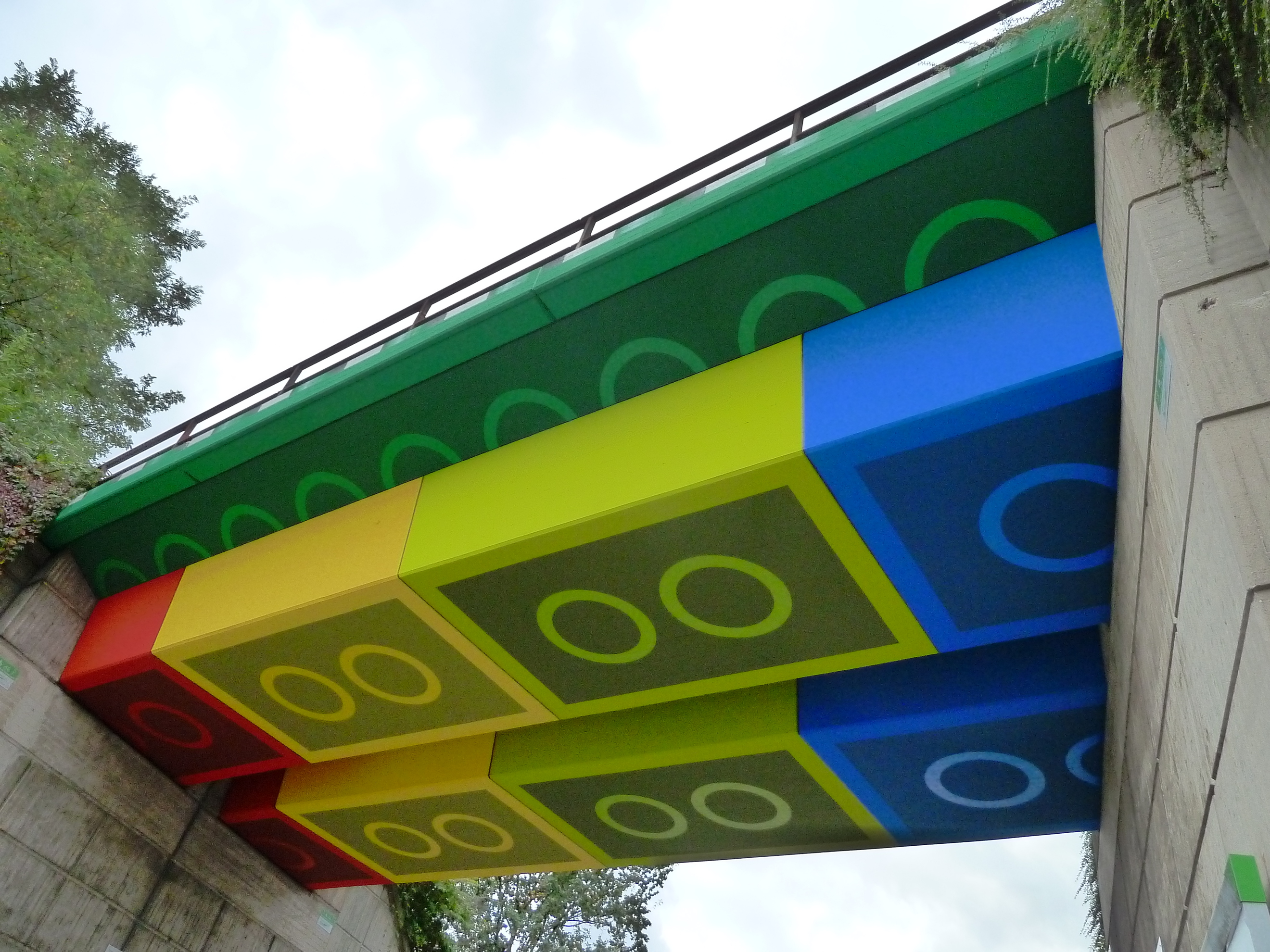
Closer view of the Lego-Brücke

The Lego-Brücke (English: Lego Bridge) is a concrete beam bridge which crosses over the Schwesterstraße in the North Rhine-Westphalian city of Wuppertal, Germany. In 2011, graffiti and street artist Martin Heuwold repainted the bridge in the style of Lego bricks, receiving national and international media attention for his work. The work was awarded the Deutscher Fassadenpreis in 2012.

== Description ==
In 2011, artist Martin Heuwold was inspired to paint one of the bridges along the Wuppertal Northern Railway which had been decommissioned in 1991. He thought of Lego bricks as a theme, commenting, "My daughters play with Lego bricks," and his wife, Ninon Becker, encouraged him to pursue the project.

After a meeting with the council of the city of Wuppertal and the charitable organization Wuppertal Bewegung, which had developed a bikeway and footway in place of the decommissioned railway, the bridge crossing the Schwesterstraße was chosen, which connects the districts of Elberfeld (Ostersbaum neighborhood) and Barmen (Clausen neighborhood). Before the redesign, Danish manufacturer Lego A/S, which produces Lego bricks, gave its approval to the project.

Wuppertal Bewegung oversaw the painting of the bridge, which took 13 days, finishing on 15 September 2011. The total area of the bridge is more than 250 m^{2} (2,700 sq ft). Heuwold was assisted by underemployed workers who were recruited for the project by Wichernhaus GmbH. The project was funded by Wuppertal Bewegung and by the sponsors Akzenta and Klauser Schuhe. The bridge was formally opened on 7 October 2011.
