= Segger (disambiguation) =

Segger may refer to:

- Segger Microcontroller Systems
- Segger (surname)
- A common misspelling for saggar, a protective kiln implement
