= Afro-American Work Songs in a Texas Prison =

- Directed by: Toshi Seeger
- Release date: 1966
- Running time: 30 minutes
- Country: United States
- Language: English

Afro-American Work Songs in a Texas Prison is a 1966 American documentary short film directed by Toshi Seeger, a specialist in films focusing on folk music.

== Premise ==
The film explores inmates in the U.S. state of Texas as they chop down trees while singing songs derived from those used by African American slaves, such as field hollers.

== Archival status ==
Afro-American Work Songs in a Texas Prison has been archived and preserved by the Library of Congress.

The complete film is streaming on Folkstreams.

== See also ==
- List of American films of 1966
