= Great Green Gobs of Greasy, Grimy Gopher Guts =

Children's song

The song "Great Green Gobs of Greasy, Grimy Gopher Guts" is a children's public domain playground song popular throughout the United States. Dating back to at least the mid-20th century, the song is sung to the tune of "The Old Gray Mare". The song, especially popular in school lunchrooms and at summer camps, is intended to inspire dark hilarity. Many local and regional variations of the lyrics exist, but whatever variant, they always entail extensive use of the literary phonetic device known as an alliteration which helps to provide an amusing description of animal body parts and fluids not normally consumed by Americans.

A recording of the song by Mika Seeger was included in a 1959 Folkways release entitled The Sounds of Camp, as a short track titled "Jingle" in the digital version. This recording was rereleased on a 1990 Smithsonian Folkways compilation titled A Fish That's a Song, a collection of traditional public domain children's songs from the United States, with liner notes that include the lyrics:

Great green globs of greasy, grimy gopher guts,
Mutilated monkey meat.
Dirty little birdie feet.
Great green globs of greasy, grimy gopher guts
And me without my spoon.

== See also ==
- Children's street culture
- Dead Skunk
