= Toshi Seeger =

German and American film producer (1922–2013)

- Born: Toshi Aline Ohta; July 1, 1922; Munich, Germany
- Died: July 9, 2013 (aged 91); Beacon, New York, U.S.
- Occupations: Filmmaker; producer; environmental activist
- Spouse: Pete Seeger (m. 1943)
- Children: 4, including Mika

Toshi Seeger (born Toshi Aline Ohta; July 1, 1922 – July 9, 2013) was an American filmmaker, producer and environmental activist. A filmmaker who specialized in the subject of folk music, her credits include the 1966 film Afro-American Work Songs in a Texas Prison and the Emmy Award-winning documentary Pete Seeger: The Power of Song, released through PBS in 2007. In 1966, Seeger and her husband, folk singer Pete Seeger, co-founded the Hudson River Sloop Clearwater, which seeks to protect the Hudson River and surrounding wetlands. Additionally, they co-founded the Clearwater Festival (officially known as The Great Hudson River Revival), a major music festival held annually at Croton Point Park in Westchester County, New York.

== Early and personal life ==
Toshi Seeger was born Toshi Aline Ohta on July 1, 1922, in Munich. Her younger brother was Allen Homarei Ohta (May 12, 1924 Philadelphia - December 15, 1997 San Francisco). Toshi's and Homarei's mother, Virginia Harper Berry, was an American originally from Washington, D.C., while their father, Takashi Ohta, was a Japanese exile from Shikoku.

Toshi's and Homarei's lives and careers were influenced by inherited progressive values. Their grandfather had translated Marxist writings into Japanese and had been involved in bringing Marxism to China. At some point he had been ordered to leave Japan. Takashi Ohta took his father's place, as permitted under Japanese law at the time, and went into exile. He met Virginia Berry while traveling, and they married and lived in Munich. Toshi and her mother moved to the United States when she was six months old; as a well-known family story goes, her mother sent a telegram to her father: "Don't meet the boat" so that Toshi would not be seen as part Japanese when she arrived in the United States. Toshi and her brother Homarei were raised in Greenwich Village and Woodstock, New York. The two attended the Little Red School House in Manhattan. Toshi graduated from The High School of Music & Art in 1940. Homarei graduated from St. John's College in 1945.

Toshi and Homarei maintained contact and collaborated throughout their lives. Homarei worked as a cabinetmaker and was later involved with the International Longshore and Warehouse Union in California, a cause Toshi supported. Homarei also participated in Toshi's work on the East Coast.

Toshi met her future husband Pete Seeger at a square dance in 1939 while still in high school. The couple married in 1943 with an engagement ring bought with money borrowed from Pete's grandmother. In 1949 they moved to a log cabin without running water or electricity, with a view of the Hudson River. She has been credited as the foundation of Seeger's personal and professional success. Toshi, Pete, and their children went to Pete's hearings before the House Un-American Activities Committee (HUAC) in Washington during the 1950s. Pete Seeger was cited for contempt of Congress in 1961, but his conviction was later overturned.

== Career ==
Toshi Seeger helped to set up the Newport Folk Festival during the early 1960s. She has also been credited with helping to discover Mississippi John Hurt, a country blues musician, during the same era. In 1965, she took part in the march from Selma to Montgomery, Alabama. She developed a career as a filmmaker and producer, often focusing on folk music and musicians. Many of her films are preserved at the Library of Congress. In 1966, she released Afro-American Work Songs in a Texas Prison, which focused on the traditional songs sung by Texas prison inmates as they chopped down trees.

When Pete Seeger's ban from television appearances for his political views was lifted in 1965, Toshi produced and directed Rainbow Quest, a public television series in 1965 and 1966 hosted by her husband . Toshi's role as producer and director was portrayed by Japanese actress Eriko Hatsune in the 2024 film A Complete Unknown, directed by James Mangold. Her official credited title for the show was "Chief Cook and Bottle Washer."

Toshi and Pete Seeger co-founded both the Hudson River Sloop Clearwater and its related musical offshoot, The Great Hudson River Revival, also known as the "Clearwater Festival". She used the festival to rally public support for cleaning up the Hudson River. Under her direction, the festival also instituted a number of ideas which were not utilized at other music festivals during the 1970s and 1980s, providing sign language interpreters, disabled-accessible wheelchair access, and recycling programs. She recruited up-and-coming musical artists to perform at the festival through its planning committee, including Tracy Chapman, before they achieved popularity elsewhere. The Clearwater Festival now attracts more than 15,000 attendees to Croton Point Park each summer.

Toshi Seeger executive produced the 2007 PBS documentary, Pete Seeger: The Power of Song, which won an Emmy Award. She was 85 years old at the time of the documentary's production. She served on numerous civic, environmental and artistic organizations, including the New York State Council on the Arts.

== Death ==
Toshi Seeger died at her home in Beacon, New York on July 9, 2013, at age 91; by her side were her husband and their youngest daughter Tinya Seeger, who had dedicated years of her life to taking care of her parents. Toshi was preceded in death by her first child Peter Jr., who died as a baby; she was survived by her other three children: Tinya, Daniel, and Mika; six grandchildren, including singer Tao Rodríguez-Seeger, Cassie, Kitama, Moraya, Penny, and Isabelle; and one great-grandson. Pete Seeger died six months later, on January 27, 2014, aged 94.
