= Seagar =

Seager is a surname. Notable people with the surname include:

- Edward Seagar (1904–1983), Anglican priest
- George Seagar (1888–1968), New Zealand rugby league player
- Jasper Seagar (died 1721), pirate active in the Indian Ocean
- Jo Seagar (born 1955), New Zealand writer, TV personality, and celebrity cook

== See also ==
- Seager
- Seeger
- Seger
