= Pageant of Chinese History =

Young adult history book by Elizabeth Seeger

The Pageant of Chinese History
- Author: Elizabeth Seeger
- Illustrator: Bernard Watkins
- Language: English
- Genre: History / Chinese history
- Publisher: Longmans, Green and Co.
- Publication date: April 1934
- Publication place: United States

The Pageant of Chinese History is a young adult Chinese history book written by Elizabeth Seeger and illustrated by Bernard Watkins. Focusing on political and cultural history, it covers the history of China from mythological times to the birth of the republic in 1912 following the abdication of Emperor Puyi. The book earned a Newbery Honor in 1935.
