= Segger (surname) =

Segger is a surname. Notable people with the surname include:

- Alexander Segger George (born 1939), Western Australian botanist
- Chris Segger, Canadian musician, member of Striker (band)
- Duncan Segger, American luhe athlete
- Marie-Claire Cordonier Segger, American professor, expert in environmental issues, including climate change and biodiversity
- Reinhard Segger (born 1946) German footballer
- Rolf Segger, founder of Segger Microcontroller Systems

== See also ==
- Seeger
- Seger
- Seager
