= Hudson River Sloop Clearwater =

NPO seeking protection of Hudson River

Hudson River Sloop Clearwater, Inc.
- Formation: 1966; 60 years ago
- Founder: Pete Seeger and Toshi Seeger
- Type: Nonprofit
- Tax ID no.: 14-6049022
- Legal status: 501(c)(3)
- Headquarters: Beacon, New York
- Board President: Samantha Hicks
- Executive Director: David Toman
- Website: https://www.clearwater.org/

The Hudson River Sloop Clearwater, Inc. is a non-profit organization based in Beacon, New York that seeks to protect the Hudson River and surrounding wetlands and waterways through advocacy and public education. Founded by folk singer Pete Seeger with his wife Toshi Seeger in 1966, the organization is known for its sailing vessel, the sloop Clearwater, and for its annual music and environmental festival, the Great Hudson River Revival.

== History ==
In 1966, Pete Seeger and his wife Toshi Seeger founded the organization and within three years had the sloop Clearwater built to advocate for cleaning up the Hudson River. The founding was influenced by community opposition to a proposed power plant at Storm King Mountain. In 1969, the Clearwater made her maiden voyage down the Atlantic Coast from the Harvey Gamage Shipyard in Maine to the South Street Seaport in New York City. Folk musician Tom Winslow wrote a folk music song, "Hey Looka Yonder (It's the Clearwater)", in which the lyrics specifically mention the fundraising efforts for the sloop, and how "black and white" people got together for this program.

Based for many years in Poughkeepsie, New York, the Clearwater moved its office to Beacon, New York, in 2009.

== Environmental advocacy ==
=== Pollution of the Hudson River ===
The Clearwater and the Clearwater Festival have worked to draw attention to the problem of pollution of the Hudson River. Pollution in the river has included mercury contamination and sewage dumping, but the most discussed issue has been General Electric's contamination of the river with Polychlorinated biphenyls (PCBs) between 1947 and 1977. This pollution caused a range of harmful effects to wildlife and people who eat fish from the river or drink the water. The activism of folk singer Pete Seeger and the Clearwater led to the area being designated as one of the superfund sites.

=== Recognition ===
Clearwater has gained national recognition for its activism starting in the 1970s to force a clean-up of the PCB contamination caused by industrial manufacturing by General Electric and other companies on the river's edge. Other specific Hudson watershed issues with which Clearwater is concerned are development pressures in the southern half of the Hudson Valley, pesticide runoff, the Manhattan west side waterfront, Indian Point nuclear reactors, and New York/New Jersey Harbor dredge spoil disposal. Clearwater played a key role in the Environmental Protection Agency (EPA) decision to compel one of the Hudson River's biggest polluters to begin removing toxic PCBs from the water and restoring one of the most polluted portions of the river.

In 2002, Pete Seeger was named a "Clean Water Hero" for his prominent efforts in the passage of the Clean Water Act. His tireless devotion to working through Clearwater and promoting its message to effectively use the law in prosecuting polluters of America's waterways has made the Clean Water Act one of the most successful environmental laws in the country.

The EPA said after Seeger's death in 2014 that "the incredible work" of Seeger and the Clearwater organization helped make the Hudson River cleaner. "His leadership was extraordinary," regional Administrator Judith A. Enck told United Press International.

=== U.S. Bicentennial and Semiquincentennial ===
During the U.S. Bicentennial on July 4, 1976, the Clearwater participated in Operation Sail, a parade of tall ships around New York City. To celebrate the U. S. Semiquincentennial, the Clearwater again joined the tall ships parade in New York City on July 4, 2026, this time called Sail250. Shortly after the parade began, the Clearwater was approached by vessels of the U. S. Coast Guard and directed to exit the parade because of banners flown by the sloop that read "Save the Clean Water Act" and "Indigenous Rights, Racial Justice, Climate Solutions".

== Environmental education ==
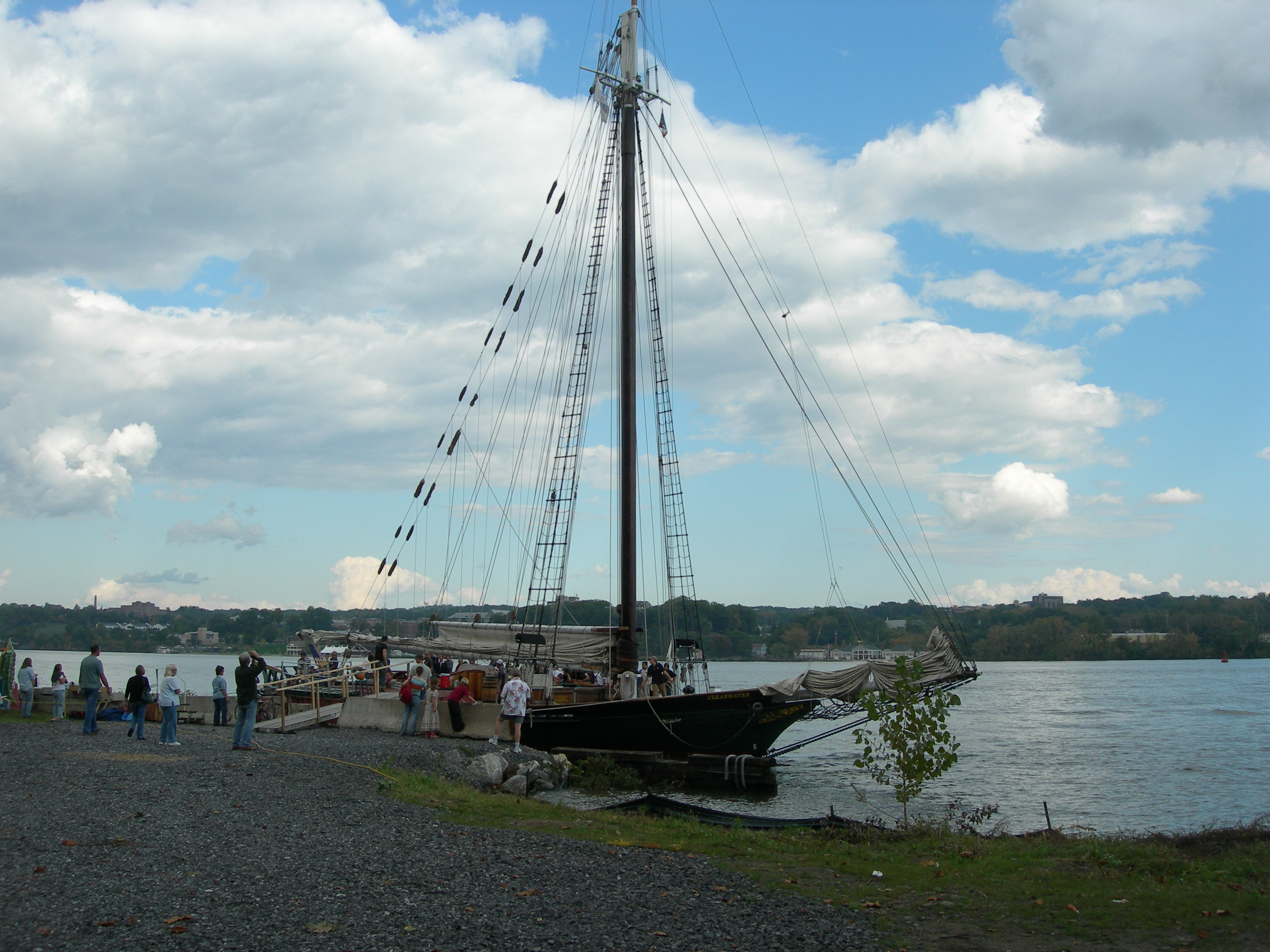
Clearwater docked near Poughkeepsie Bridge for local festival

Clearwater's environmental education programs are intended to heighten public awareness of the Hudson River's unique ecosystem that blends freshwater streams from the Adirondack Mountains with the salt tides of the Atlantic Ocean around New York City.

Sailing mostly on the Hudson River between New York City and Albany, New York, the sloop Clearwater is used primarily to offer environmental and biological education programs to school groups, touching on river biology, environmental protection of waterways and related topics. It offers sails for Clearwater members and the general public, as well as private charters.

In addition to the professional crew, Clearwater offers opportunities for people to sail as volunteer crew for one week periods or as an intern/apprentice for up to two months to learn sailing, environmental education and assist with vessel maintenance. From 1996 until 2018, Clearwater chartered the schooner Mystic Whaler to present Clearwater's education program to more schools and the public.

== Sloop Clearwater ==
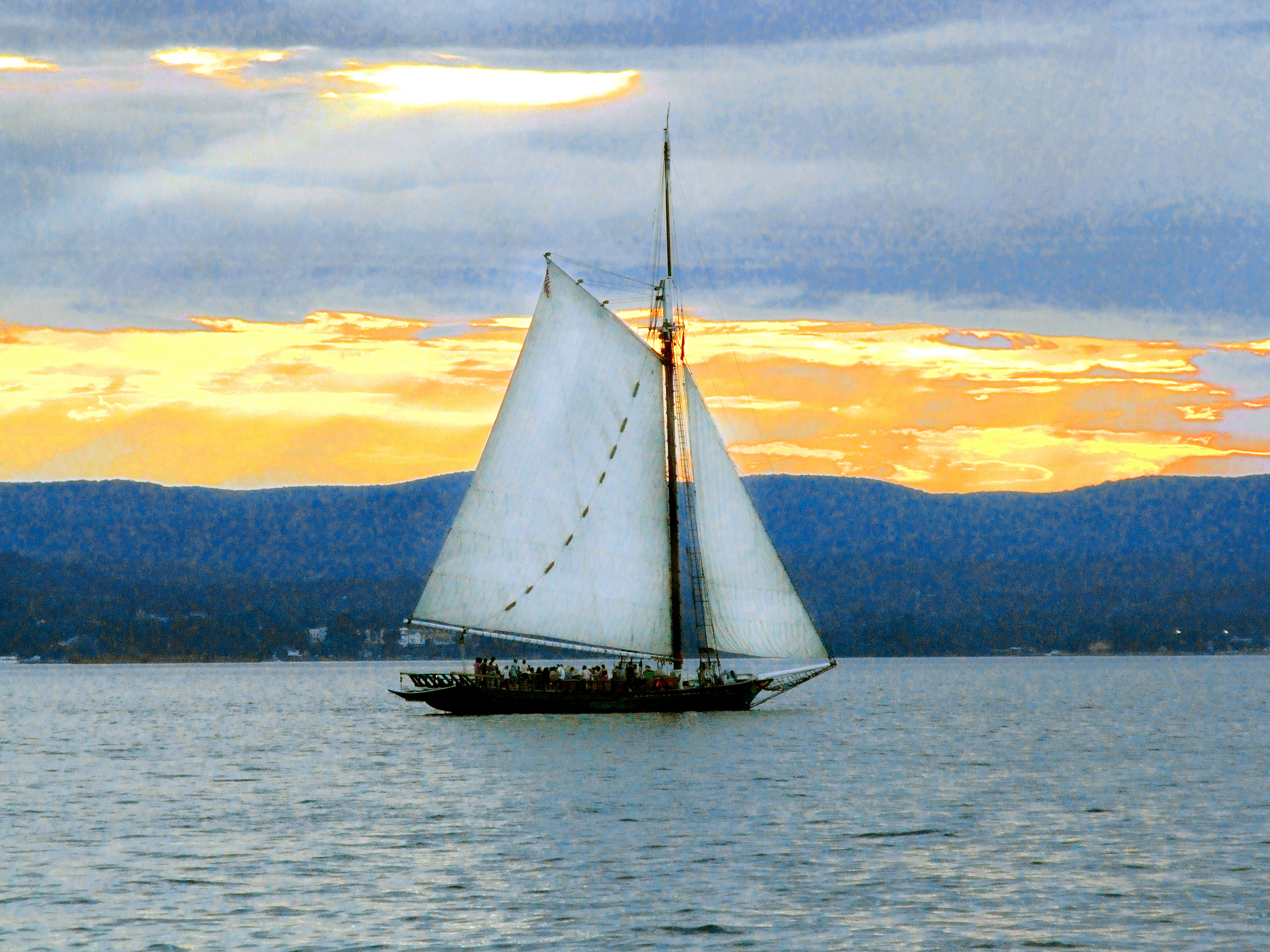
- Sloop Clearwater sailing up the Hudson River

History

United States
- Name: Clearwater
- Builder: Harvey Gamage Shipyard, South Bristol, Maine
- Laid down: October, 1968
- Launched: May 17, 1969

General characteristics
- Type: Gaff rigged sloop
- Length: 106 ft (32 m) overall
- Beam: 25 ft (7.6 m)
- Draft: 8 ft (2.4 m)
- Propulsion: sails; auxiliary engine
- Sail plan: mainsail, main topsail, jib
- Notes: 4305 sq ft. (387.5 m²) total sail area
- Hudson River Sloop Clearwater
- U.S. National Register of Historic Places
- Location: Beacon, New York
- Built: 1968
- Architect: Hamlin, Cyrus; Gamage, Harvey Shipyard
- NRHP reference No.: 04000376
- Added to NRHP: May 4, 2004

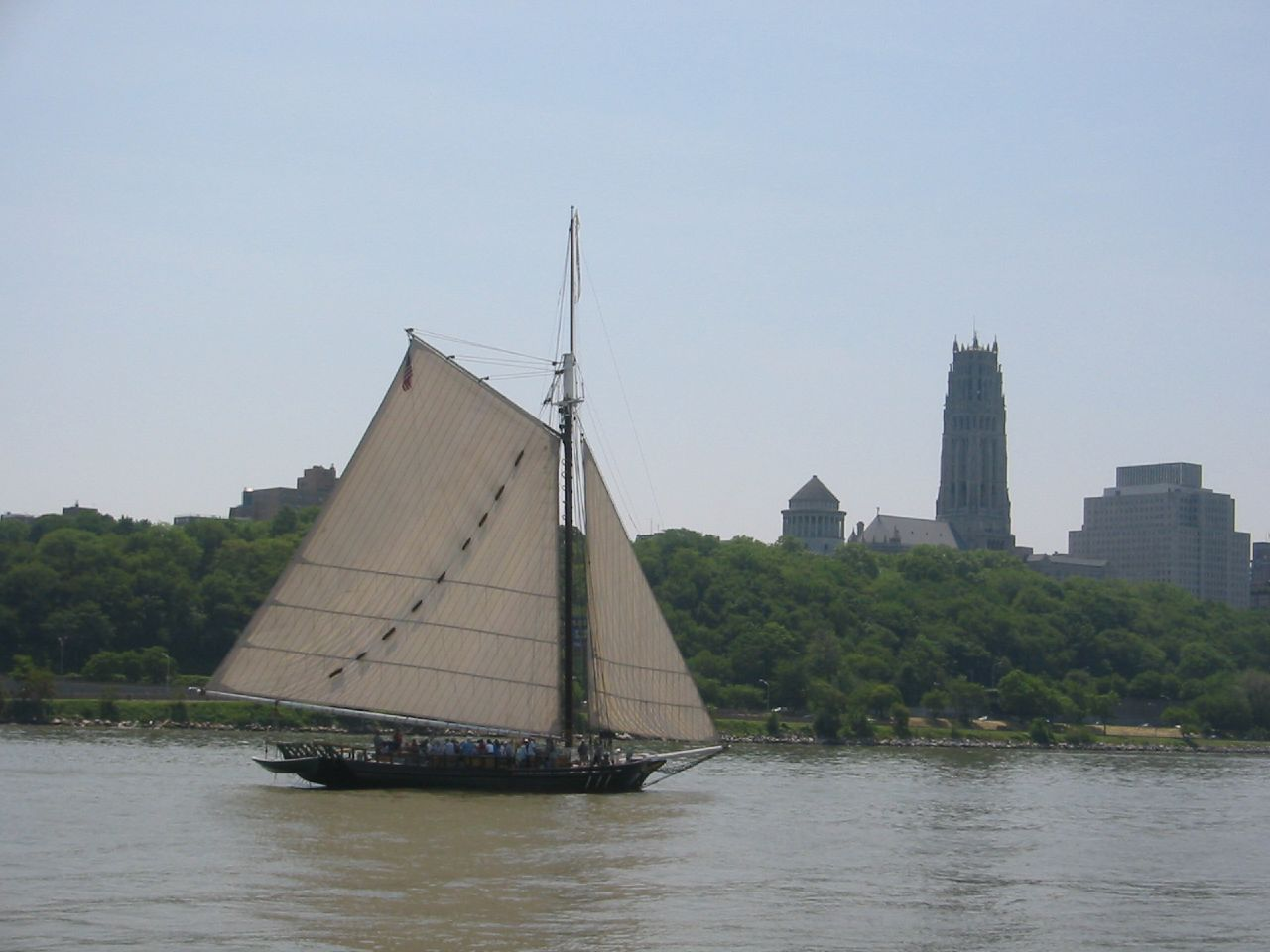
Clearwater sailing south on the Hudson River past Manhattan's Grant's Tomb and Riverside Church

Hudson River Sloop Clearwater, Inc. owns and operates the sloop Clearwater, the centerpiece of Clearwater's public education programs. Clearwater serves as a movable classroom, laboratory, stage, and forum.

The Clearwater is a 106-foot (32 m) wooden sailing vessel designed after 18th and 19th century Dutch sailing sloops. With a large gaff rig, a hinged centerboard, and wide shallow hull, these vessels evolved to deal with the challenges of strong tides, shallow waters, and variable winds encountered on the Hudson River. Designed by Cy Hamlin and built by The Harvey Gamage Shipyard in South Bristol, Maine, Clearwater was launched in 1969. Built of traditional plank-on-frame wooden construction, the sloop is 76 feet (23 m) in length on deck, 25 feet (7.6 m) in beam and can hold up to 70 tons of cargo. The sloop rig consists of a single mast and topmast which together rise to a height of 108 feet (33 m). A 65-foot (20 m) long main boom and 45-foot (14 m) gaff carry a 3,000-square-foot (280 m^{2}) mainsail. A 28-foot (8.5 m) long bowsprit carries a 900-square-foot (84 m^{2}) jib on the foredeck. In light wind, a 450-square-foot (42 m^{2}) topsail may also be raised.

In 2004, the sloop Clearwater was listed on the National Register of Historic Places for her significance to the environmental movement. The Clearwater has a smaller sister ship, the Sloop Woody Guthrie, that is used in education about the river.

Seeger wrote at least eleven songs with themes about water and river conservation and restoration. For example, in 2012, Seeger and Lorre Wyatt released the music video and single "God's Counting on Me, God's Counting on You", which they recorded and filmed on the Clearwater, while sailing on the Hudson in 2010, about the Deepwater Horizon Gulf oil spill of 2010.

== Music and festivals ==
One of the organization's biggest fundraisers was its annual music and environmental festival, the Clearwater Festival, held at Croton Point Park in Croton-on-Hudson, New York, from the late 1960s to 2022. The festival was America's oldest and largest annual festival of its kind. The weekend-long festival drew over a half million people over the decades. Officially known as the "Great Hudson River Revival", it raised funds and consciousness on the plight of the river and the earth. Net proceeds went directly to support Clearwater's environmental research, education and advocacy to help preserve and protect the Hudson River and its tributaries, as well as communities in the river valley. Music ranged from Blues to Rock, Reggae to Salsa, Bluegrass to Jazz, and Funk to Folk. The festival was cancelled in 2022, due in part to the COVID-19 pandemic.

A new festival, Hudson River Music Festival, was established at Croton Point Park in 2025, which seeks to educate festivalgoers about environmental issues and sustainability. It is co-presented by Riverfest FPS (For Pete’s Sake), but the Clearwater organization is not a sponsor.

=== Walkabout Clearwater Chorus ===
The Walkabout Clearwater Chorus, a supporter of the Hudson River Sloop Clearwater, was founded in 1984 by Seeger. The chorus is made up of people who love to sing and promote environmental and social justice causes. Its 7-foot-tall (2.1 m) model of the Sloop Clearwater appears with the chorus at festivals and parades. The chorus performs at concert venues and festivals throughout the Hudson Valley area and beyond. It appears on Seeger's 2008 Grammy-winning CD Pete Seeger at 89. The Seeger Session of Liedstoeckel, Cuppatea and Walkabout Clearwater Chorus was performed live at UZ-Pressefest 2009 in Dortmund, Germany, where the chorus has performed bi-annually since 2001. The chorus also runs a coffeehouse with a different featured folk music performer each month. The concerts take place at Memorial United Methodist Church in White Plains, New York, twice each month from October to May of each year.

== See also ==
- Sustainability
- Biodiversity
- Global warming
- Ecology
- Natural environment
- Recycling
- Outdoor Education
