= Woody Guthrie (sloop) =

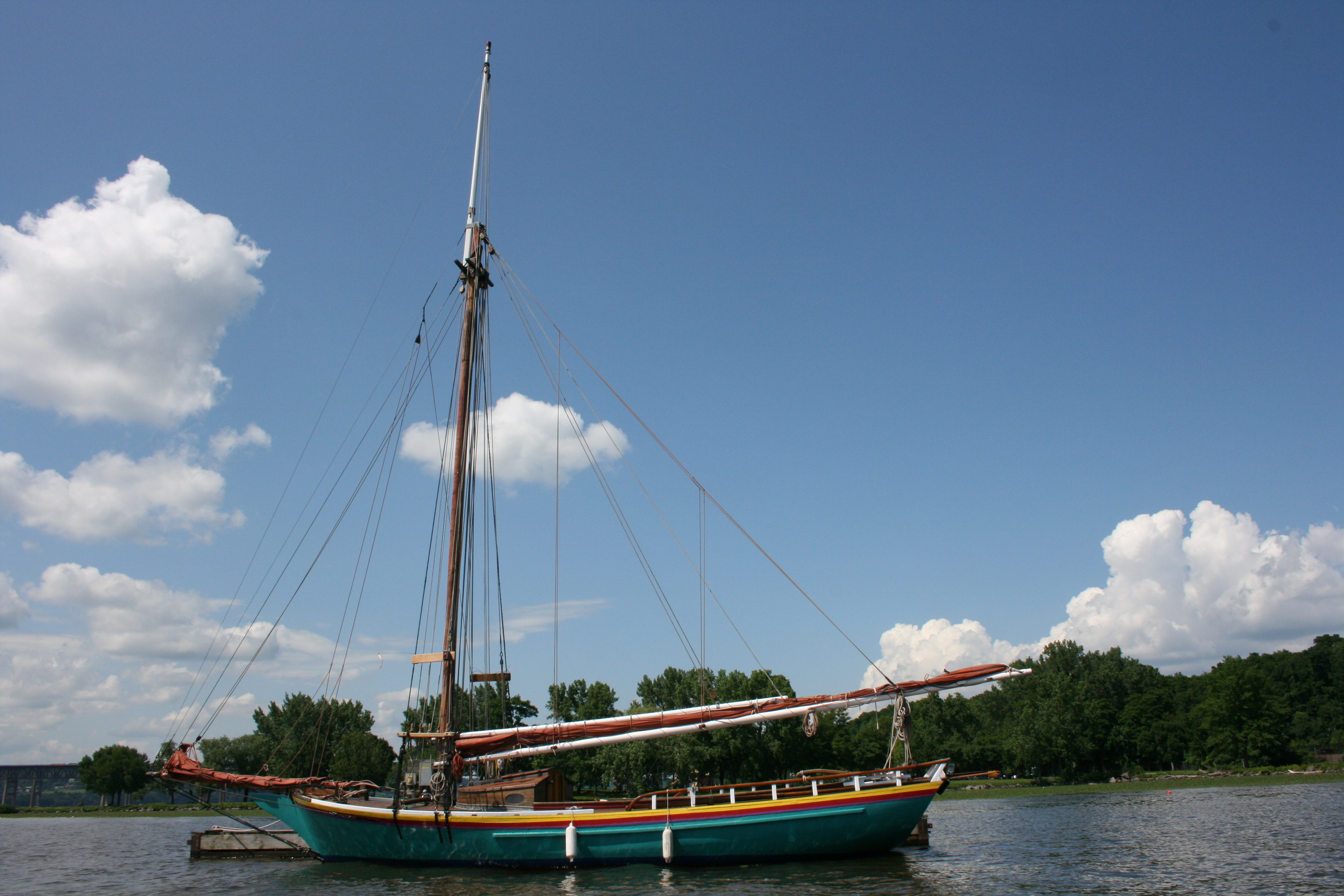
- Sloop Woody Guthrie moored in Beacon Harbor on the Hudson River

History

United States
- Name: Woody Guthrie
- Launched: 1978

General characteristics
- Type: sloop
- Length: 47 ft (14 m) overall
- Beam: 11.5 ft (3.5 m)
- Draft: 3.5 ft (1.1 m)
- Propulsion: sails; electric auxiliary engine
- Sail plan: gaff rig, 886 ft^{2} (82.3 m^{2}) total sail area

Woody Guthrie is a 47-foot (14 m) gaff sloop which supports the mission of the larger sloop Clearwater educating people about the Hudson River and its environment. The vessel was ordered by Pete Seeger in 1978 for the Beacon Sloop Club, which has supplied volunteers to maintain and operate it ever since. The boat is named after the progressive folk singer Woody Guthrie, a friend of Seeger's and author of the tune, "This Land is Your Land".

Since the Woody Guthrie was built, volunteers have given sailing experience to thousands of members and guests of the Beacon Sloop club for free. Guests are educated by the volunteers about the history of the river and the boat and asked to help the mission of the boat in any way they can. In August 2017, the Woody Guthrie was relaunched after six years of fundraising, two years of work, $400k spent, and 5,000 volunteer hours. She was restored at the Hudson River Maritime Museum in Kingston, New York.
