= Charles Louis Seeger Sr. =

American international businessman (1860–1943)

- Born: January 13, 1860; Springfield, Massachusetts, U.S.
- Died: November 6, 1943 (aged 83); New York City, U.S.
- Occupation: Businessman
- Years active: c. 1880s–1943
- Spouse: Elsie Simmons
- Children: Charles Jr.; Alan; Elizabeth
- Relatives: Pete Seeger (grandson); Peggy Seeger (granddaughter); Mike Seeger (grandson)

Charles Louis Seeger Sr. (January 13, 1860 – November 6, 1943) was an American international businessman of the turn of the 20th century. He was the father of World War I poet Alan Seeger and musicologist/composer Charles Seeger Jr., and grandfather of folk singers Pete, Peggy and Mike Seeger. He was an influential figure in international commerce, particularly in the American role in the development of modern Mexico and Mexico City, and in the international rubber industry.

== Early life ==
Seeger was born in Springfield, Massachusetts, on January 13, 1860, the son of Elisabeth Amelia (White) and Edwin Seeger. He was of part German descent. His father and grandfather had been doctors. Graduating at the top of his high school class, Seeger was urged to attend Harvard University by a group of wealthy Springfield citizens who offered financial assistance, but he did not accept their charity.

== Career ==
Seeger saw an opportunity to find his fortune in Mexico. He became an editor and co-owner of the bilingual newspaper Mexican Financier, during a time of dramatic development of the nation's railroads and electrification. The newspaper became influential and informative in the common economic life of the two countries, but faltered in the late 1880s and was sold for a high price to a Mexican-British syndicate, securing Seeger's fortune.

In 1899, Seeger and his former partner in the newspaper published the Cyclopedia of the Manufactures and Products of the United States, a 1400-page catalogue of American industrial products that could, incidentally, be purchased through his trading company. At the time, Seeger was commuting between the United States and Mexico, and played a role in the electrification, street paving and development of a street railway company in Mexico City. His Mexican Electric Vehicle Company sold electric and gasoline powered vehicles manufactured by the Columbia Automobile Company of Hartford, Connecticut.

Seeger remained an advocate for Mexico long into his international career in the American rubber industry. In 1915, he was a severe critic of American policy during the Mexican Revolution that had evolved out of the last years of the Porfiriato. In a lengthy critique published in the New York Times of January 3, 1915, he called American policy toward Mexico under President Woodrow Wilson inconsistent, confused and counterproductive both in relation to the efforts of Americans in Mexico of the previous years to continue progress between the two countries, and to American allies in Europe who would be inclined to see them as an attempt to bring Mexican territory into the United States.

Seeger's attention to Europe became more focused with the death of his son Alan in the Battle of the Somme on July 4, 1916, at the village of Belloy-en-Santerre, France. With his wife, Elsie Simmons Seeger, he donated a new bell to the village church in Alan's name and donated a number estimated by some as thousands of fruit trees to the region surrounding the village to help rehabilitate an agricultural industry that had been devastated by the war.

After Alan's death, Charles led the effort for Charles Scribner's Sons to publish two posthumous books by Alan Seeger, Poems and Letters and Diary, of which he was the editor. In 1918, he began the process of founding the modern American Library in Paris in his son's honor, with a dedication of 50,000 francs from the royalties of the Seeger books. He led the library's founding and became chairman of its board of directors.

== Death ==
Charles Seeger Sr. died on November 6, 1943, in New York City. His hand-produced memoirs reference a life of interest in music and art, and include some of his etchings of various places to which he had traveled. They are held in the Director's Archives of the American Library in Paris.
