= Spencer L. Seager =

American chemist

Spencer L. Seager is professor of chemistry at Weber State University.

== History ==
He received his B.S. degree in chemistry and Ph.D. in physical chemistry from the University of Utah under the dean of science at the time, Henry Eyring; his adviser was J. Calvin Giddings.

He began teaching at WSU in 1960. He served as chemistry department chairman from 1969 to 1993.

== Subjects taught ==
He teaches introductory, general, and physical chemistry at the university and is also active in projects to help improve chemistry and other science education in local elementary schools.

== Books ==
- Introductory Chemistry for Today
- Chemistry for Today: General, Organic, and Biochemistry
- Organic and Biochemistry for Today
- Safety Scale Laboratory Experiments for Chemistry For Today: General, Organic, and Biochemistry
- Environmental Chemistry: Air and Water Pollution

== Publications ==
- "Energy, from Source to Use"
- "Rapid Determination of Gaseous Diffusion Coefficients by Means of Gas Chromatography Apparatus"
- "Temperature Dependence of Gas and Vapor Diffusion Coefficients"
- "Plate height in coiled columns"
- "Plate Height in Gas Chromatography"
- "Colorimetric Determination of Low Concentrations of Primary and Secondary Alcohols"
- "Rapid Diffusional Analysis by Chromatographic Methods"
- "Environmental Chemistry: Air and Water Pollution"
