= Peggy Seeger =

American folk singer (born 1935)

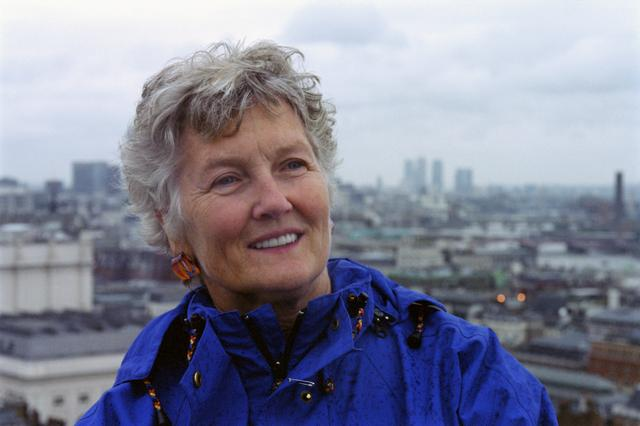
- Seeger in Salford, England in 2011

Background information
- Born: Margaret Seeger; June 17, 1935 (age 91); New York City, U.S.
- Genres: Folk
- Occupations: Musician; singer; songwriter
- Instruments: Banjo; guitar; dulcimer; concertina; autoharp; piano
- Years active: 1955–present
- Labels: Folkways; Rounder; Argo; Riverside; Appalseed; Tradition
- Spouse: Ewan MacColl (m. 1977; died 1989)
- Website: peggyseeger.com

Margaret "Peggy" Seeger (born June 17, 1935) is an American folk singer and songwriter. She has lived in Britain for more than 60 years and was married to the singer-songwriter Ewan MacColl until his death in 1989. She is a member of the Seeger family of musicians.

== Life and career ==
=== Early years ===
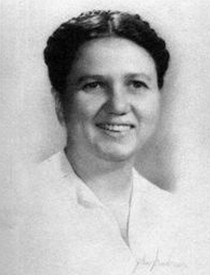
Composer Ruth Crawford Seeger, Peggy Seeger's mother

Seeger's father was Charles Seeger (1886–1979), a folklorist and musicologist; her mother was Seeger's second wife, Ruth Porter Crawford (1901–1953), a modernist composer who was the first woman to receive a Guggenheim Fellowship.

The family moved to Washington, D.C. in 1936, after Charles's appointment to the music division of the Resettlement Administration.

One of her brothers was Mike Seeger, and Pete Seeger was her half-brother. Poet Alan Seeger was her uncle. One of her first recordings was American Folk Songs for Children (1955).

=== First American period ===
In the 1950s, left-leaning singers such as Paul Robeson and The Weavers began to suffer professionally because of the influence of McCarthyism and its resulting restrictive influence on performance venues signing leftist artists. Seeger visited the People's Republic of China and as a result had her US passport withdrawn. In 1957, the US State Department had opposed Seeger's attending the 6th World Festival of Youth and Students in Moscow, where the CIA had monitored the US delegation and was vigorously critical about her having gone to China during that trip against official "advice". The authorities had warned her that her passport could be impounded, which would bar her from further travel were she to return to the USA. Seeger decided to tour Europe and later found out that she was on a blacklist sent to European governments.

=== Immigration to Britain ===
Seeger first met Ewan MacColl in 1956, when she went to London, after being offered a job by Alan Lomax to perform as a singer and banjoist with a folk group called The Ramblers. She fell in love with MacColl and started an affair with him even though he was then married to his second wife, Jean Newlove. Seeger moved back to the US and worked on a radio show in Los Angeles in 1957. Whilst she was there, MacColl wrote "The First Time Ever I Saw Your Face" for her. Seeger again met MacColl at the festival in Moscow. They later reconnected in France, in May 1958, and decided to have a child together. Previously married to director and actress Joan Littlewood, MacColl left his second wife, Jean Newlove, to become Seeger's lover.

While she was in France and without a UK work permit, a plan was concocted by MacColl and Seeger, to marry the Scottish folk singer Alex Campbell, in Paris, on January 24, 1959, in what Seeger has described as a "hilarious ceremony". This marriage of convenience, which lasted three years, allowed Seeger to gain British citizenship and continue her relationship with MacColl. MacColl and Seeger were married 18 years later (on 25 January 1977), following his divorce from Newlove. They remained together until his death in 1989. They had three children: Neill, Calum, and Kitty. Seeger also became stepmother of singer Kirsty MacColl, MacColl's daughter from his previous relationship. They recorded and released several albums together on Folkways Records, along with Seeger's solo albums and other collaborations with the Seeger Family and the Seeger Sisters.

Seeger was a leader in the introduction of the concertina to the English folk music revival. While she was not the only concertina-player, her "musical skill and proselytizing zeal... was a major force in spreading the gospel of concertina playing in the revival".

The 1971 documentary film A Kind of Exile was a profile of Seeger and also featured Ewan MacColl. The film was directed and produced by John Goldschmidt for ATV and shown on ITV in the UK.

=== Two social critics ===
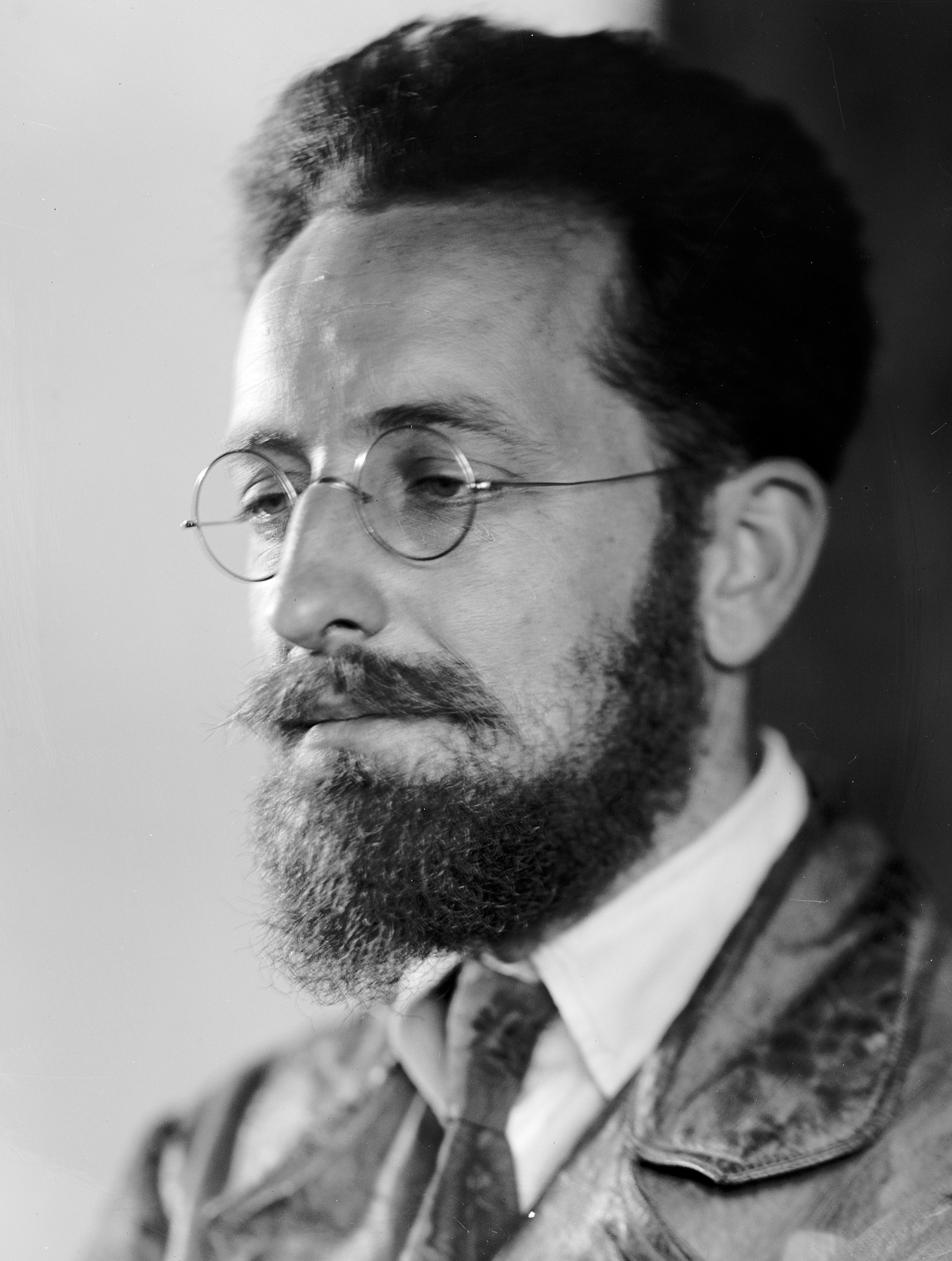
Musicologist Charles Seeger, Peggy Seeger's father

Together with MacColl, Seeger founded The Critics Group, a "master class" for young singers performing traditional songs or to compose new songs using traditional song structures (or, as MacColl called them, "the techniques of folk creation"). The Critics Group evolved into a performance ensemble seeking to perform satirical songs in a mixture of theatre, comedy and song, which eventually created a series of annual productions called "The Festival of Fools" (named for a traditional British Isles event in which greater freedom of expression was allowed for the subjects of the king than was permitted during most of the year). Seeger and MacColl performed and recorded as a duo and as solo artists; MacColl wrote "The First Time Ever I Saw Your Face" in Seeger's honour (and did so during a long-distance phone call between the two, while Seeger was performing in America and MacColl was barred from traveling to the US with her due to his radical political views). None of the couple's numerous albums use any electric or electronic instrumentation.

Whilst MacColl wrote many songs about work and against war and prejudice, Seeger (who also wrote such songs) sang about women's issues, with many of her songs becoming anthems of the women's movement. Her most memorable was "I'm Gonna Be an Engineer". There were two major projects dedicated to the Child Ballads. The first was The Long Harvest (10 volumes 1966–75). The second was Blood and Roses (5 volumes, 1979–83). She visited the Greenham Common Women's Peace Camp, where protests against US cruise missiles were concentrated. For them she wrote "Carry Greenham Home". Seeger also ran a record label, Blackthorne Records, from 1976 to 1988.

=== Recent years ===
After the fall of the Soviet Union, US authorities began to soften their attitude towards Seeger. She returned to the United States in 1994 to live in Asheville, North Carolina. Seeger has continued to sing about women's issues. She recorded Love Will Linger On in 1995. She has published a collection of 150 of her songs from before 1999.

In 2011, Seeger edited The Essential Ewan MacColl Songbook. Her introduction gave a detailed account of her life with MacColl. She expressed some difference of political perspective between MacColl and herself.

As a budding eco-feminist, I find the subject matter of many of the songs in this book very hard to deal with. A developed eco-feminist would probably not have undertaken this book at all. Ewan was a Marxist, a militant, gut-political product of the tail-end of the industrial revolution. In most of his songs, men are digging, slashing, cutting, building, re-shaping, raping, controlling, humanising the earth and being praised for doing so for the good of mankind. Humanity and the class struggle were Ewan's main preoccupations but his songs deal with men: men's work, men's lives, men's activities and many veiled (and not so veiled) references to the power of the penis. Even where it is obvious that both sexes are being referred to, Ewan (like myself in my early songs and like most people in our patriarchal society) employs masculine pronouns.

In 2006, Peggy Seeger relocated to Boston, Massachusetts, to accept a part-time teaching position at Northeastern University. In 2008, she began producing music videos pertaining to the Presidential campaigns, making them available through a YouTube page.

After 16 years of living in the United States, Seeger moved back to the United Kingdom in 2010 to be nearer to her children; since 2013, she has been living in Iffley, Oxford.

In 2012, she collaborated with experimental dance producer Broadcaster on an album of her songs set against dance beats.

Seeger is bisexual and contributed an essay to Getting Bi: Voices of bisexuals around the world. In it she details a relationship she began with the traditional singer Irene Pyper-Scott (who lives in New Zealand) after Ewan MacColl died.

Seeger performed "Tell My Sister" on a live tribute album to the late Canadian folk artist Kate McGarrigle entitled Sing Me the Songs: Celebrating the Works of Kate McGarrigle. The album was released in June 2013.

Seeger's memoir, First Time Ever: A Memoir was published by Faber and Faber in October 2017. A double CD of songs to accompany the memoir was released at the same time.

Since early 2022, Seeger has been doing her "First Farewell" tour of Britain and Ireland.

== Selected discography ==
=== Solo albums ===
- Courting and Complaining Songs (1954) (subsequently reissued as Folksongs of Courting and Complaint)
- Animal Folksongs for Children (1957)
- Folksongs and Ballads (1957)
- A Song for You and Me (1962)
- The Best of Peggy Seeger (1963)
- Peggy Alone (1967)
- Penelope Isn't Waiting Anymore (1977)
- Different Therefore Equal (1979)
- The Folkways Years 1955 1992 Songs of Love and Politics (1992)
- Familiar Faces (1993)
- Songs of Love and Politics (1994)
- Love Will Linger On (1995)
- An Odd Collection (1996)
- Classic Peggy Seeger (1996)
- Period Pieces (1998)
- No Spring Chickens (1998)
- Almost Commercially Viable (2000)
- Heading For Home (2003)
- Love Call Me Home (2005)
- Bring Me Home (2008)
- Peggy Seeger Live (2012)
- Everything Changes (2014)
- Love Unbidden (2020)
- The First Farewell (2021)
- Teleology (2025)

=== With Ewan MacColl ===
- Matching Songs of the British Isles and America (1957)
- Second Shift – Industrial Ballads (1958)
- Chorus From The Gallows (1960)
- Popular Scottish Songs (1960)
- Singing The Fishing (1960)
- New Briton Gazette, Vol. 1 (1960)
- Classic Scots Ballads (1961)
- Bothy Ballads of Scotland (1961)
- Two Way Trip (1961)
- New Briton Gazette, Vol. 2 (1962)
- Jacobite Songs – The Two Rebellions 1715 and 1745 (1962)
- Steam Whistle Ballads (1964)
- Traditional Songs and Ballads (1964)
- The Amorous Muse (1966)
- The Manchester Angel (1966)
- The Long Harvest 1 (1966)
- The Long Harvest 2 (1967)
- The Long Harvest 3 (1968)
- The Angry Muse (1968)
- The Long Harvest 4 (1969)
- The Long Harvest 5 (1970)
- The World Of Ewan MacColl And Peggy Seeger (1970)
- The Long Harvest 6 (1971)
- The Long Harvest 7 (1972)
- The World Of Ewan MacColl And Peggy Seeger Vol. 2 – Songs from Radio Ballads (1972)
- At The Present Moment (1972)
- Folkways Record of Contemporary Songs (1973)
- The Long Harvest 8 (1973)
- The Long Harvest 9 (1974)
- The Long Harvest 10 (1975)
- Saturday Night at The Bull and Mouth (1977)
- Cold Snap (1977)
- Hot Blast (1978)
- Blood and Roses (1979)
- Kilroy Was Here (1980)
- Blood and Roses 2 (1981)
- Blood and Roses 3 (1982)
- Blood and Roses 4 (1982)
- Blood and Roses 5 (1983)
- Freeborn Man (1983) [reissued 1989]
- Daddy, What did You Do in The Strike? (1984) [cassette mini-album]
- White Wind, Black Tide – Anti-Apartheid Songs (1986) [cassette album]
- Items of News (1986)

=== With Mike Seeger ===
- American Folk Songs Sung by the Seegers (1957)
- Peggy 'n' Mike (1967)
- American Folksongs for Children (1977)
- American Folk Songs for Christmas (with Penny Seeger) (1990)
- Animal Folk Songs for Children (with Penny and Barbara Seeger) (1992)
- Fly Down Little Bird (2011)

=== With the Critics Group and Frankie Armstrong ===
- The Female Frolic (1967)
- Living Folk (1970)

=== With guests ===
- Three Score and Ten (concert) (2007)

=== Collaboration ===
- Who's Going to Shoe Your Pretty Little Foot (Topic UK version, 1964) – US version by Tom Paley and Peggy Seeger with Claudia Paley
- The Unfortunate Rake (1960) – In 2009, track sixteen from this album ("Girl on the Green Briar Shore") was included as track five on the seventh CD of Topic Records' 70-year anniversary boxed set, Three Score and Ten.
