= Michael Seager =

Zimbabwean cricketer

Personal information
- Full name: Michael Anthony John Seager
- Born: 8 December 1947 (age 78); Salisbury, Southern Rhodesia
- Batting: Left-handed
- Bowling: Right-arm medium
- Relatives: Christopher Seager (brother)

Domestic team information
- Years: Team
- 1978/79: Rhodesia B
- 1969–1970: Berkshire

Career statistics
Competition	First-class
Matches	1
Runs scored	48
Batting average	24.00
100s/50s	–/–
Top score	41
Balls bowled	–
Wickets	–
Bowling average	–
5 wickets in innings	–
10 wickets in match	–
Best bowling	–
Catches/stumpings	–/–
- Source: Cricinfo, 23 November 2011

Michael Anthony John Seager (born 8 December 1947) is a former Zimbabwean cricketer. Seager was a left-handed batsman who bowled right-arm medium pace. He was born at Salisbury, Southern Rhodesia (today Harare, Zimbabwe).

Seager made his debut in English county cricket for Berkshire in the 1969 Minor Counties Championship against Dorset. He played Minor counties cricket for Berkshire in 1969 and 1970 seasons, making a total of ten appearances. Back in Rhodesia, he later made a single first-class appearances for Rhodesia B against Natal B in February 1979. In this match, Seager scored 7 runs in Rhodesia B's first-innings, before being dismissed by Ismail Ebrahim, while in their second-innings he scored 41 runs, before being dismissed by Peter Williams. Natal B won the match by 37 runs.

His brother, Christopher, was also a first-class cricketer.
