= Mika Seeger =

American ceramic artist

- Occupation: Ceramic artist
- Known for: Ceramic murals
- Spouse: Joe Bossom
- Children: 3, including Tao Rodriguez-Seeger
- Parent(s): Toshi Ohta; Pete Seeger

Mika Seeger is an American ceramic artist. Although not primarily a musical artist, she is known for her version of the song "Great Green Gobs of Greasy, Grimy Gopher Guts".

== Early life and education ==
Mika is the daughter of filmmaker Toshi Seeger and American folk musician Pete Seeger.

== Career ==
Mika seeger is a ceramic artist.

=== Ceramic murals ===
Seeger's ceramic murals were often created in collaboration with other artists, including local schoolchildren.

- Providence, Rhode Island India Point Park
- Cranston, Rhode Island Mural in Chester Barrow School 1994, Country & City" 1997
- Beacon, New York Under River 1990–92, Common Clay 1991–92
- Tiverton, Rhode Island Animal Alphabet 1994, A Walk Through Tiverton 1996–97
- Warwick, Rhode Island Under Creatures 1996, Friendship 1997
- Narragansett, Rhode Island 2007
- Friends Academy, North Dartmouth, Massachusetts 2012-14

=== Music ===
Although not primarily a musical artist, she did record a definitive version of "Great Green Gobs of Greasy, Grimy Gopher Guts".

== Personal life ==
Seeger married artist Joe Bossom, with whom she has two children. She had one child, Tao Rodríguez-Seeger, from her relationship with Emilio Rodríguez, a Puerto Rican filmmaker.

Seeger achieved some prominence in 1968 when she was arrested for involvement in anti-police demonstrations in Mexico City in July 1968. She rejected legal assistance from the U.S. Embassy, electing to retain local counsel. Mexico expelled Seeger from Mexico at the end of the year.
