= Hermann Seeger =

German painter

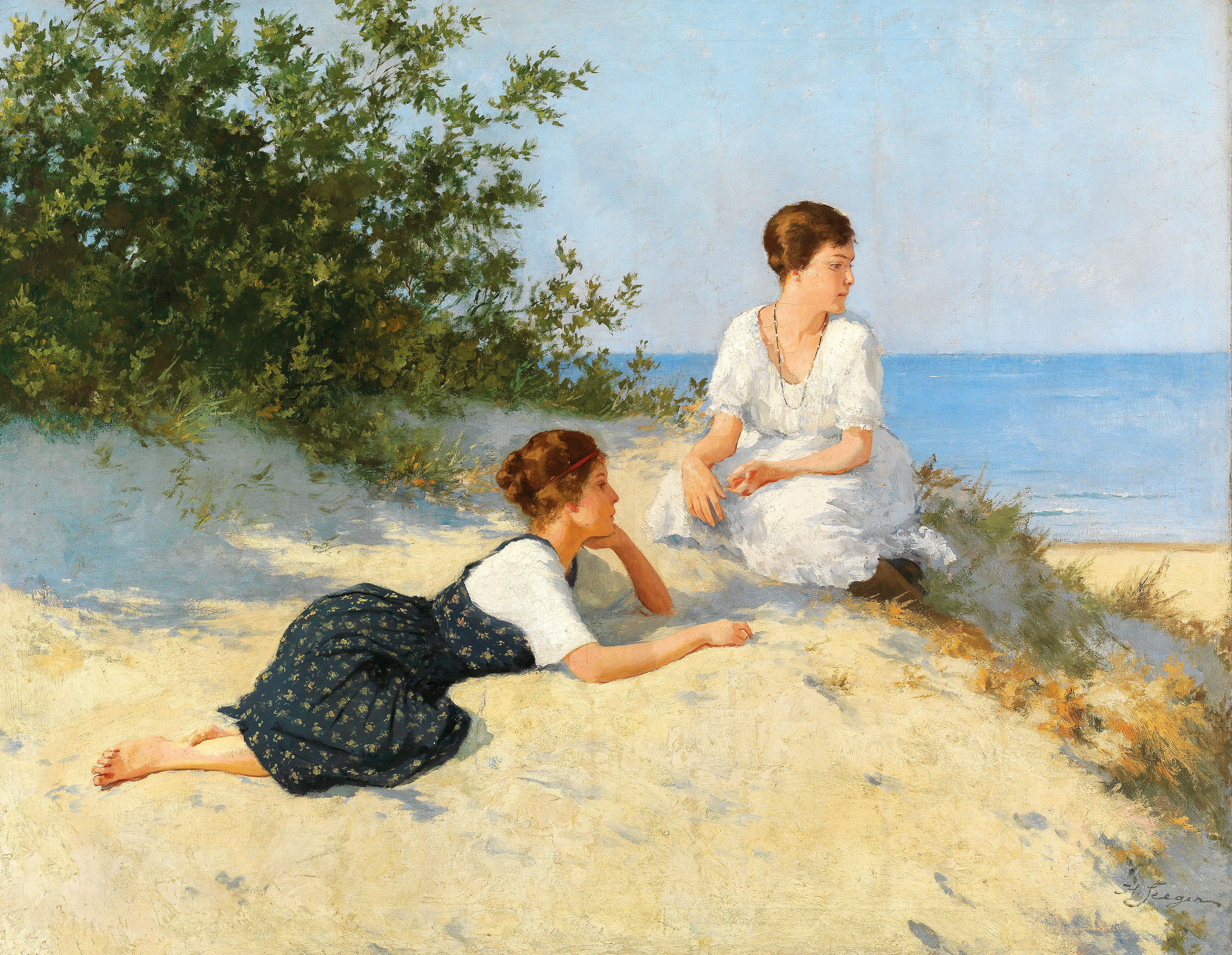
- Girls in the beach of the Baltic Sea
- Born: 15 October 1857; Halberstadt
- Died: 23 February 1945 (aged 87); Drawsko Pomorskie
- Known for: Painting
- Movement: Romanticism

Hermann Seeger (15 October 1857 – 23 February 1945) was a German genre and landscape painter. Seeger was also known as a talented engraver.

== Biography ==
Hermann Seeger was born at Halberstadt. At the age of 18, he moved to Halle to study philosophy, but eventually, Seeger turned to art and enrolled at the Berlin Academy. He graduated it in 1885. His most renowned works were painted in the coastal villages of Baltic Sea.

== Personal life ==
Seeger met his wife Marie Cramer in Berlin. They had four children. His daughters Hildegard and Ilse were often taking part in the painting process as his models in the beach scenes.

== Resources ==
- Tutt' Art - Hermann Seegar
- Seeger's works in exhibition
- Biography
