= Everything Changes (Peggy Seeger album) =

Studio album by Peggy Seeger
- Released: September 1, 2014
- Recorded: Yellow Fish Studios, Voom Studios
- Label: Signet Music
- Producer: Calum MacColl

Peggy Seeger chronology
Bring Me Home (2008)	Everything Changes (2014)

Everything Changes is a 2014 album by American folk singer Peggy Seeger. It is Peggy's 22nd album and was released on September 1, 2014 by Signet Music.

== Recording ==
Although Seeger was 79 when it was made, it is the first solo album which Seeger has recorded with a band (rather than solo or as a duo). Musicians included Calum and Neil MacColl, her sons with her late husband Ewan MacColl. One track, "Swim To The Star", was commissioned by the BBC for a program about the sinking of the Titanic.

== Critical reaction ==
Professional ratings
Aggregate scores
Source	Rating
Metacritic	79/100
Review scores
Source	Rating
The Guardian	5/5 stars
Financial Times	4/5 stars
Telegraph	3/5 stars
MusicOMH	5/5 stars

Metacritic rates it 79/100 from 5 reviews. Robin Denislow in The Guardian gave it 5/5, calling it "a revelation". The Guardian also rated it number 35 in their best albums of 2014. The Financial Times gave it 4/5, praising the "impeccable musical backing". The Daily Telegraph praised it for dealing with difficult subjects and "keeping up with the times", scoring it 3/5. Music OHM gave it 5 stars.

Seeger and Calum MacColl won the BBC Radio 2 Folk Award for Original Song of the Year in 2015 for "Swim To The Star".

== Track listing ==
No.	Title	Writer(s)	Length
1.	"Swim to the Star"	Calum MacColl, Peggy Seeger	3:04
2.	"Go to Sleep"	Calum MacColl, Neill MacColl	3:31
3.	"Nero's Children"	Peggy Seeger	2:55
4.	"We Watch You Slip Away"	Kate St. John, Peggy Seeger	3:11
5.	"Flowers by the Roadside"	Calum MacColl, Peggy Seeger	3:24
6.	"When Fairy Stories End"	Peggy Seeger	2:55
7.	"Do You believe in Me?"	Lou Berryman, Peter Berryman	2:46
8.	"Over the Mountain to You"	Peggy Seeger	2:51
9.	"You Don't Know How Lucky You Are"	Peggy Seeger	3:02
10.	"Miss Heroin"	Rutthy Taubb	4:05
11.	"Everything Changes"	Peggy Seeger	4:06
