= Elizabeth Seeger =

American children's author and educator (1889–1973)

- Born: 1889
- Died: November 1, 1973 (aged 83–84); Bridgewater, Connecticut, U.S.
- Education: Art Students League of New York
- Occupations: Author; educator
- Relatives: Charles Louis Seeger Sr. (father); Charles Seeger (brother); Alan Seeger (brother)
- Writing career
- Genre: Children's literature

Elizabeth Seeger (1889 – November 1, 1973) was an American children's author and educator. Her first book, Pageant of Chinese History, was a Newbery Honor recipient in 1935. She taught for many years at the Dalton School, eventually becoming director of the high school division.

== Early life and education ==
Elizabeth Seeger was born in 1889, the younger sister of musicologist Charles Seeger and poet Alan Seeger. She attended the Brearley School in New York City, as well as the Art Students League of New York.

== Career ==
After initially teaching for a time in Dutchess County, New York, Seeger took a position at the Dalton School in New York City in 1922; she would work there in various capacities for thirty-five years.

Pageant of Chinese History, Seeger's first book, grew out of her frustration in attempting to find a children's history of China for her students. Her later books included The Pageant of Russian History (1950), The Five Sons of King Pandu: The Story of The Mahabhárata (1967), The Ramayana (1969), and Eastern Religions (1973).

== Death ==
Seeger died at her home in Bridgewater, Connecticut, on November 1, 1973.
