= Christopher Seager =

Zimbabwean cricketer and civil engineer

Personal information
- Full name: Christopher Paul Seager
- Born: 5 April 1951 (age 75); Salisbury, Southern Rhodesia
- Batting: Right-handed
- Relatives: Michael Seager (brother)

Domestic team information
- Years: Team
- 1971: Cambridge University
- 1970: Berkshire

Career statistics
Competition	First-class
Matches	8
Runs scored	104
Batting average	10.40
100s/50s	0/0
Top score	23
Catches/stumpings	2/–
- Source: Cricinfo, 23 November 2011

Christopher Paul Seager (born 5 April 1951) is a former Zimbabwean cricketer. He became a civil engineer in Zimbabwe.

== Career ==
Seager was born in Salisbury, Southern Rhodesia (today Harare, Zimbabwe), and educated at Peterhouse Boys' School. He later attended Jesus College, Cambridge, where he made his first-class debut as a right-handed batsman for Cambridge University against Leicestershire in 1971. He made seven further first-class appearances for the university in 1971. His most successful match for Cambridge was his last, the 1971 University Match: he scored 23 and 19 and ran out two Oxford batsmen with his accurate throws from the field. Seager also played four matches for Berkshire in the 1970 Minor Counties Championship.

Seager returned to Zimbabwe. He represented Zimbabwe Country Districts in several non-first-class matches against touring international teams in the 1980s.

A civil engineer, Seager has worked in the construction and mining industries in Zimbabwe for more than 40 years, including six years as an engineer with the Ministry of Roads. As of 2025, he is an operations manager with the construction company Bitumen World. Also as of 2025, he serves on the board of governors for the Peterhouse Group of Schools.

His brother, Michael, was also a first-class cricketer in Zimbabwe.
