= Charles Seeger =

American composer and musicologist (1886–1979)

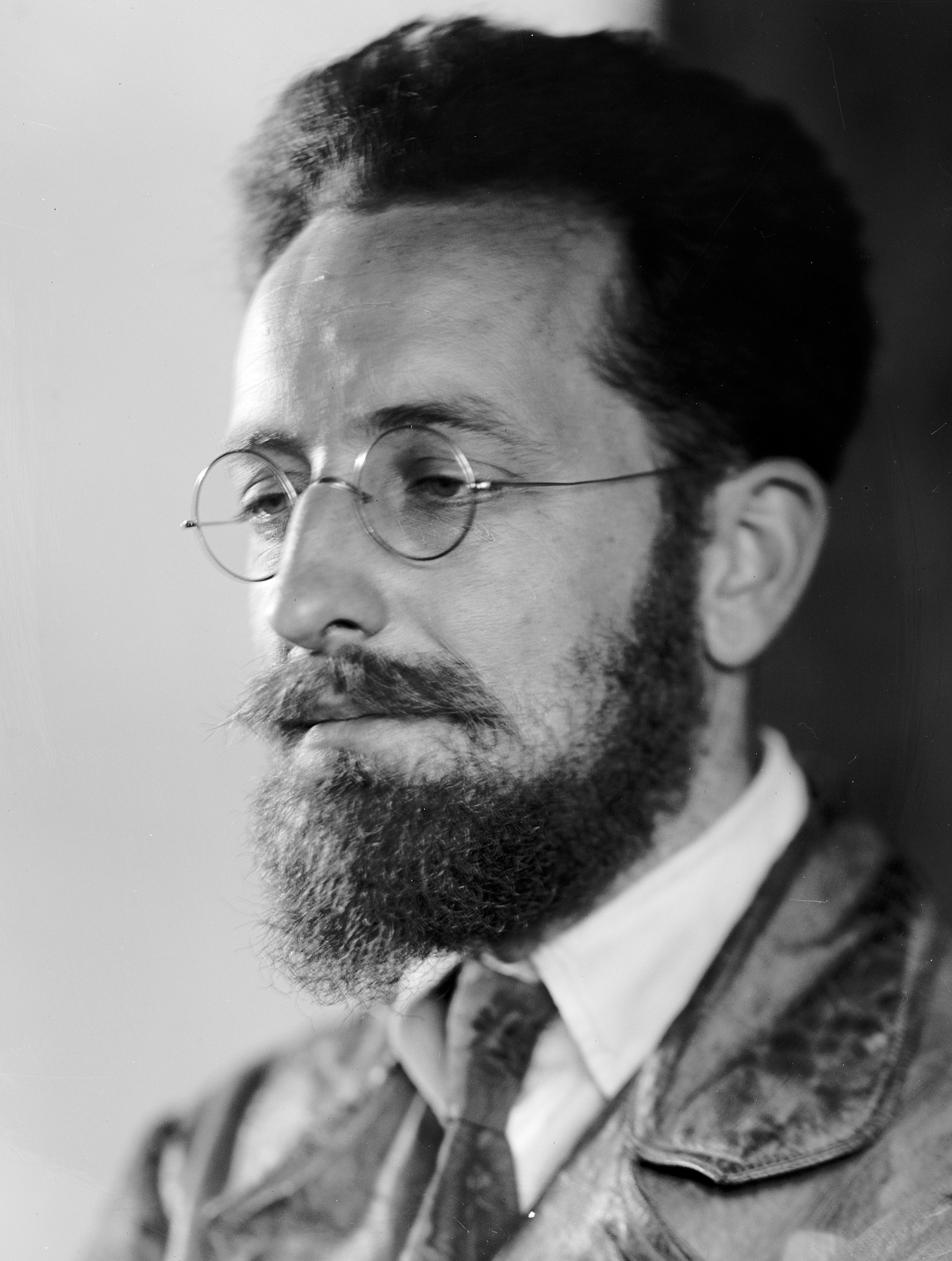
- Seeger in 1950
- Born: Charles Louis Seeger Jr. December 14, 1886; Mexico City, Mexico
- Died: February 7, 1979 (aged 92); Bridgewater, Connecticut, U.S.
- Resting place: Springfield Cemetery
- Occupations: Composer; musician; conductor; musicologist
- Years active: 1908–1971
- Spouses: Constance de Clyver Edson (div. 1927) Ruth Crawford Seeger (m. 1937; died 1953)
- Children: Pete; Peggy; Mike
- Father: Charles Louis Seeger Sr.
- Relatives: Alan Seeger (brother); Elizabeth Seeger (sister)

Charles Louis Seeger Jr. (December 14, 1886 – February 7, 1979) was an American musicologist, composer, teacher, and folklorist. He was the husband of the composer Ruth Crawford Seeger, father of the American folk singers Pete Seeger, Peggy Seeger, and Mike Seeger; and brother of the World War I poet Alan Seeger and children's author and educator Elizabeth Seeger.

== Early life and education ==
Seeger was born in Mexico City, Mexico, to American parents Elsie Simmons (née Adams) and Charles Louis Seeger. During the 1890s, the family lived in Staten Island, New York. Seeger graduated from Harvard College in 1908, then studied in Cologne, Germany and conducted with the Cologne Opera.

== Career ==
Upon discovering a hearing impairment, he left Europe to take a position as Professor of Music at the University of California at Berkeley, where he taught from 1912 to 1916 before being dismissed for his public opposition to U.S. entry into World War I. His brother Alan Seeger was killed in action on July 4, 1916, while serving as a member of the French Foreign Legion. Charles Seeger then taught at The Juilliard School (originally the Institute of Musical Art) in New York from 1921 to 1933 and the New School for Social Research from 1931 to 1935.

Among Seeger's many specific interests were prescriptive and descriptive music writing and determining the definition of what is meant by singing style.

Along with composer Henry Cowell, ethnomusicologist George Herzog, Helen Heffron Roberts and Dorothy Lawton of the New York Public Library, Seeger was a founding member of the American Society for Comparative Musicology in 1933, the parent organization of the American Library of Musicology (ALM). Seeger envisioned the short-lived ALM as a publisher of music-related resources, but it ceased to exist by 1936.

From 1935 to 1953 he held positions in the federal government's Resettlement Administration, Works Projects Administration (WPA), and Pan American Union, including serving as an administrator for the WPA's Federal Music Project, for which his wife also worked, from 1938 to 1940. In 1936, he was in Washington, DC, working as a technical advisor to the Music Unit of the Special Skills Division of the Resettlement Administration (later renamed the Farm Security Administration).

From 1957 to 1961, he taught at the University of California Los Angeles. From 1961 to 1971 he was a research professor at the Institute of Ethnomusicology at UCLA. In 1949–50 he was visiting professor of the Theory of Music in the School of Music at Yale University.

== Personal life and death ==
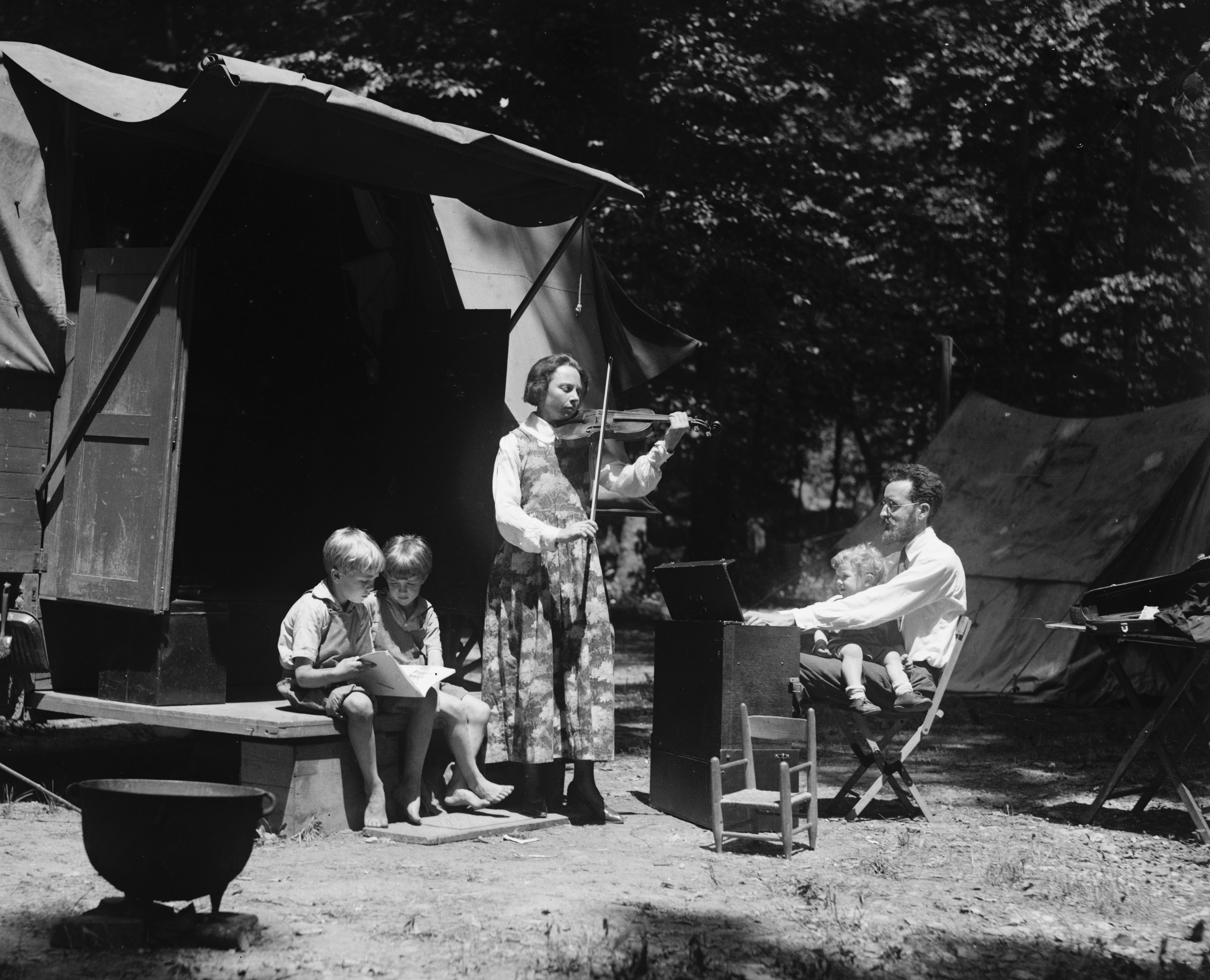
Charles Seeger, his first wife, Constance, and their three sons on a camping trip (May 23, 1921).

His first wife was Constance de Clyver Edson, a classical violinist and teacher; they divorced in 1927. They had three sons, Charles III (1912–2002), who was an astronomer, John (1914–2010), an educator, and Pete (1919–2014), a folk singer.

His second wife was the composer and musician Ruth Crawford Seeger whom he married in 1937 (née Ruth Porter Crawford). With her he had four children: Mike Seeger (1933–2009), Peggy Seeger (born 1935), Barbara Seeger and Penny Seeger (1943–1993). His grandson, Anthony Seeger (born 1945), is an anthropologist and professor of ethnomusicology at the University of California Los Angeles.

Seeger died on February 7, 1979, in Bridgewater, Connecticut. He was buried at the Springfield Cemetery in Springfield, Massachusetts along with his second wife.

== Legacy ==
He is known, among other reasons, for his formulation of dissonant counterpoint. According to the ethnomusicologist Bruno Nettl, "Seeger played a unique and central role in tying musicology to other disciplines and domains of culture. This collection shows him to be truly a musical 'man for all seasons,' for what comes across most is the many-sidedness of the man."
