= Croton Point Park =

Park in New York

Coordinates: 41°10′56″N 73°53′35″W

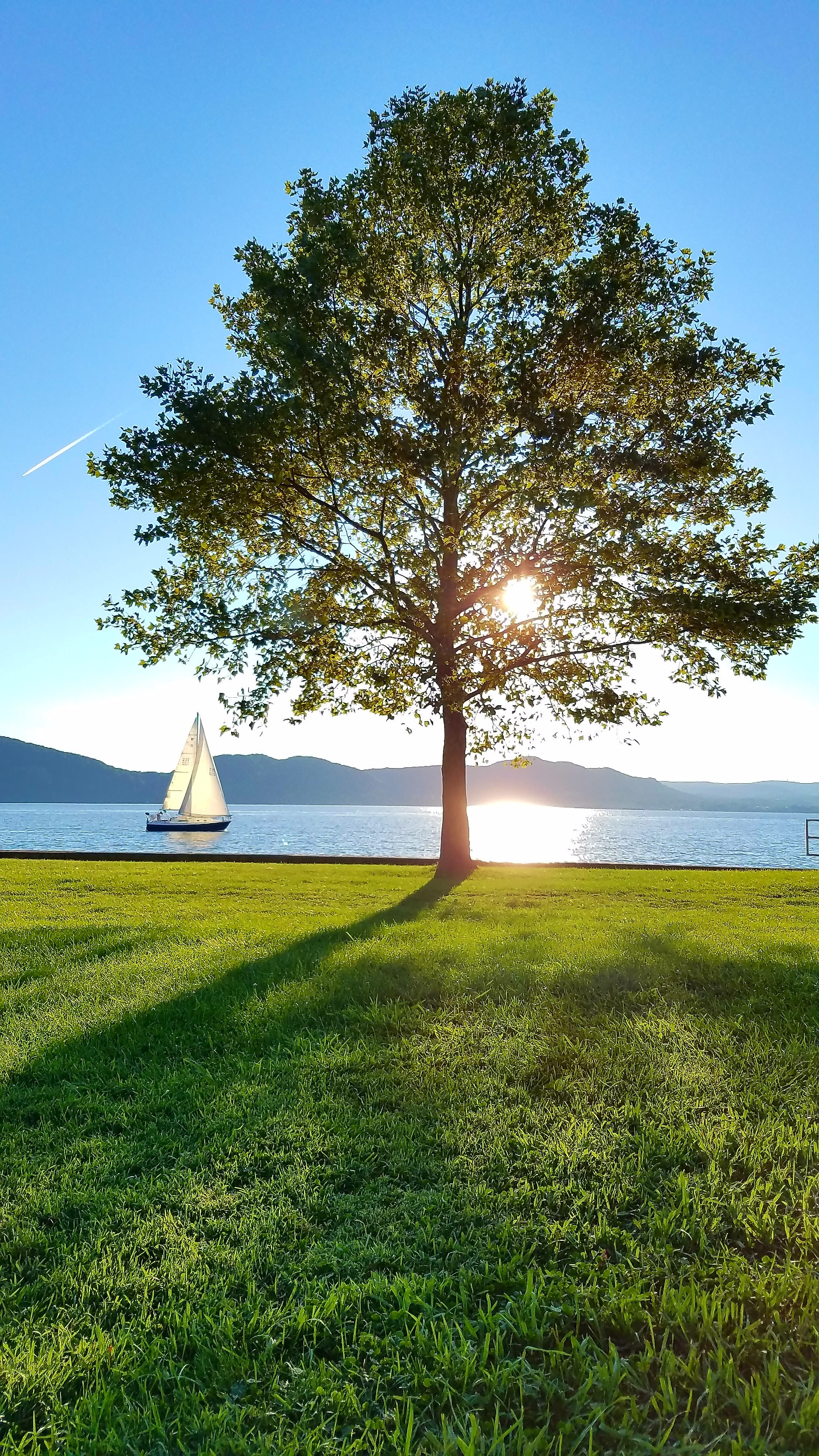
Croton Point Park

Croton Point Park is a Westchester County park in the village of Croton-on-Hudson, New York, United States.

The park has several public attractions including a miniature aircraft airport, boat launch, tent and RV camping, cabin rental, cross-country skiing, fishing, group picnicking, hiking and walking trails, a museum, nature study, pavilions, a playground, swimming, and a beach. The Jack Peterson Memorial (also known as the Defense of Teller’s Point historical marker) is located at the southern end of the park.

== History ==
In the 1800s the Underhill family owned the land that is now Croton Point Park. Grapes, watermelons, and apples were grown. A brickyard was also on the property. A few buildings built with these bricks are still standing at Croton Point. The park is also home to several historic sites such as a set of wine cellars from an old manor.

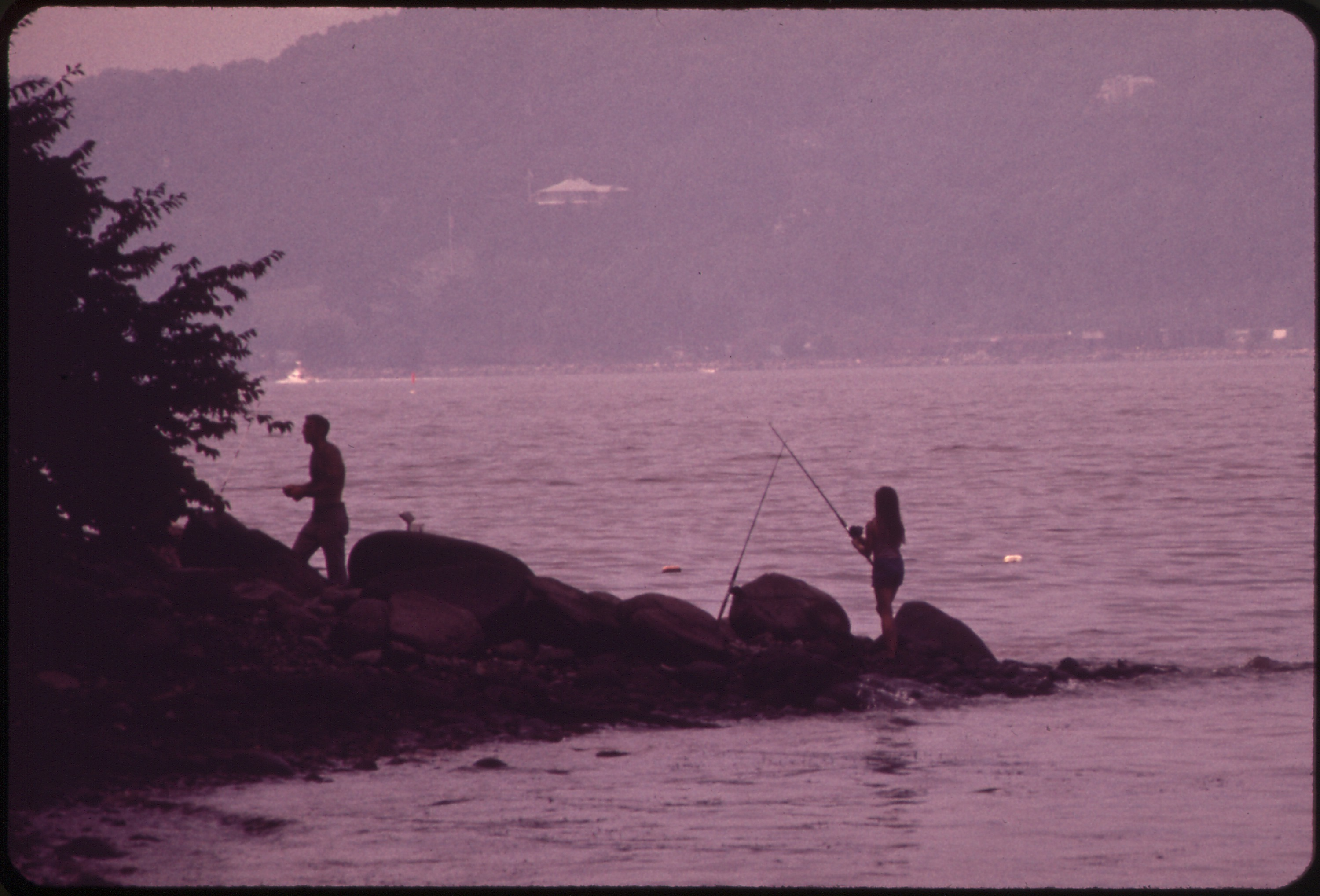
Fishing in the Hudson River from Croton Point Park, 1973

A substantial portion of the land on which the park is situated today was the site of a landfill, which was operated by the Westchester County government from 1927 to 1986. The landfill has since been capped off and restored to green space. A 1931 map shows the landfill area as marsh.

== Events ==
The park hosts a number of events each year, including the annual Hudson River Sloop Clearwater festival, the Croton Point Shindig, and Hudson River Eagle Fest.
