= Klauser Schuhe =

Coordinates: 51°16′2″N 7°11′4″E

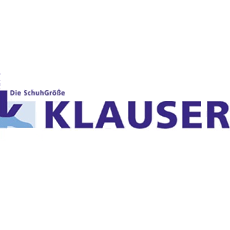
- Type: Limited (Kommanditgesellschaft)
- Industry: Shoe shop
- Founded: 9 May 1936; 90 years ago
- Founder: Klara Klauser
- Headquarters: Wuppertal, Germany
- Key people: Peter Prange (manager); Hermann-Josef Richter (manager)
- Number of employees: 1900
- Website: klauser-schuhe.de

The company Klauser, also known as Klauser Schuhe or Schuhhaus Klauser, is one of the largest owner-operated shoe retailers in Germany. With its main office located in Wuppertal, the company employs 1900 people in 130 branches. Klauser celebrated its 75th anniversary in 2011.

== History ==
Klara Klauser founded the Klauser Schuhe business in 1936 by buying a shoe shop from Walter Kamp who was emigrating to the United States, a business described as an "acquisition of Jewish trades by Aryan businessmen". A second shop was acquired in 1938 from the Jew Siegfried Rosenberg, who had had to abandon it because of a boycott campaign. Another shop taken over from a Jew was the Schuhpalast in the industrial metropolis Barmen, a shop which had existed since 1889. The previous owners were Emil Rosendahl and Max Guggenheimer, the first of whom died in the KZ Theresienstadt.

Partners Gerd and Maria Prange joined the company in 1965, hiring future manager Hermann-Josef Richter a year later. In April 1969, the headquarters were moved to the Wasserstraße in Wuppertal's Barmen district, where it remains to this day.

In the 1970s and 80s, the company expanded by opening additional branches in Wuppertal and other cities of North Rhine-Westphalia. By 1986 there was a network of 28 branches.

Klauser acquired the Voswinkel company and its small chain of shops in 1989. In the 1990s, further expansion took place as shops were opened in neighboring Thuringia and Saxony. The central office and the central warehouse were almost fully reconstructed in 1994.

In early 2009 the 51 German branches of the almost-bankrupt shoe store chain Salamander Schuhe were acquired. Prior to that, Klauser had its own 80 outlets and with the help of 1200 employees made a turnover of around €110 million (ca US$143 million). As a result of the takeover, the number of employees increased to more than 1800; as a result of this, Klauser is now one of Germany's largest owner-operated shoe shops, only being exceeded by Deichmann, Leiser Handelsgesellschaft mbH and Görtz.
