= Das Lied von der Erde =

Orchestral work by Gustav Mahler

- A Symphony for Tenor, Alto (or Baritone) Voice and Orchestra
- by Gustav Mahler
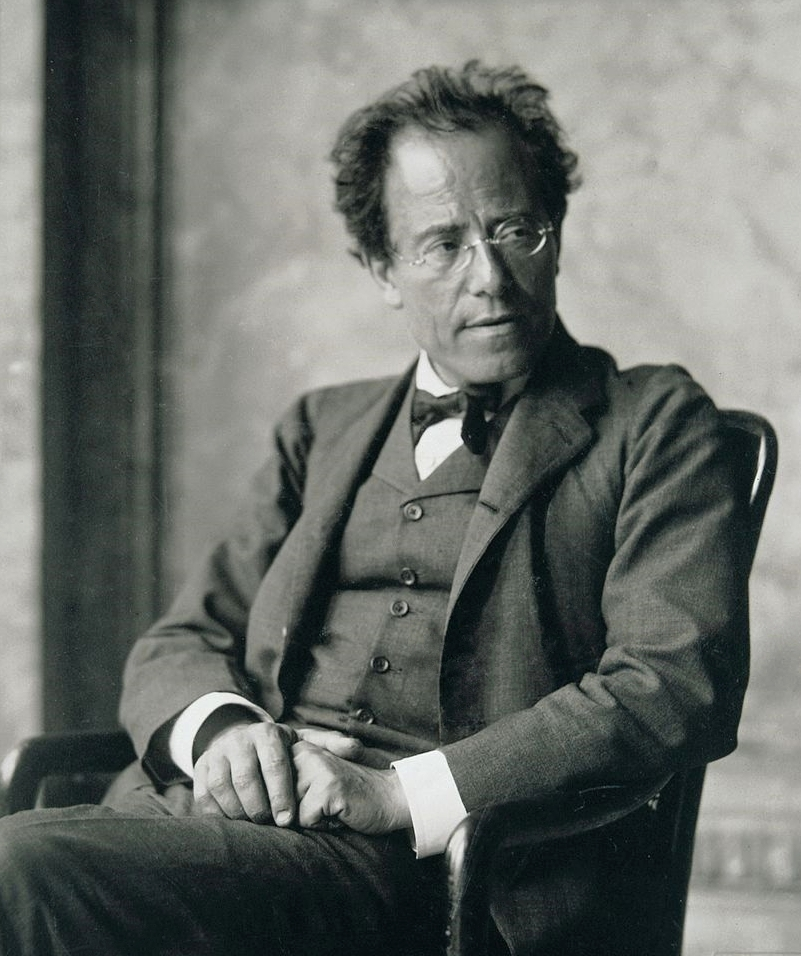
- Gustav Mahler in 1907
- Key: A minor – C major
- Text: From Hans Bethge's Die chinesische Flöte
- Composed: 1908: Toblach
- Published: 1912, Universal Edition
- Duration: c. 60 min
- Movements: six
- Scoring: contralto; tenor; orchestra

Premiere
- Date: 20 November 1911
- Location: Munich Tonhalle, Munich
- Conductor: Bruno Walter
- Performers: Sara Cahier, William Miller

Das Lied von der Erde (The song of the Earth) is an orchestral work for two voices and orchestra written by Gustav Mahler between 1908 and 1909. Described as a symphony when published, it comprises six movements for a large orchestra and two singers as the soloist alternating in the movements. Mahler specified that the two singers should be a tenor and an alto, or else a tenor and a baritone if an alto is not available.

Mahler composed this work following the most painful period in his life, and the songs address themes such as those of living, parting and salvation. On the centenary of Mahler's birth, the composer and prominent Mahler conductor Leonard Bernstein described Das Lied von der Erde as Mahler's "greatest symphony". As with his later Symphony No. 9, Mahler did not live to hear Das Lied von der Erde performed.

== History ==
=== Composition ===
Three disasters befell Mahler during the summer of 1907. Political maneuvering and antisemitism forced him to resign as Director of the Vienna Court Opera, his eldest daughter Maria died from scarlet fever and diphtheria, and Mahler himself was diagnosed with a congenital heart defect. "With one stroke", he wrote to his friend Bruno Walter, "I have lost everything I have gained in terms of who I thought I was, and have to learn my first steps again like a newborn."

The same year saw the publication of Hans Bethge's Die chinesische Flöte, a free rewriting of others' translations of classical Chinese poems. Mahler was captivated by the vision of earthly beauty and transience expressed in these verses and chose seven of the poems to set to music as Das Lied von der Erde. Mahler completed the work in 1909.

Mahler was aware of the so-called "curse of the ninth", a superstition arising from the fact that no major composer since Beethoven had successfully completed more than nine symphonies: he had already written eight symphonies before composing Das Lied von der Erde. Fearing his subsequent demise, he decided to subtitle the work A Symphony for Tenor, Alto (or Baritone) Voice and Orchestra, rather than numbering it as a symphony. His next symphony, written for purely instrumental forces, was numbered his Ninth. That was indeed the last symphony he fully completed, because only portions of the Tenth had been fully orchestrated at the time of his death.

=== Reception ===
The first public performance was given on 20 November 1911 in the Tonhalle in Munich, sung by Sara Cahier and William Miller (both Americans) with Bruno Walter conducting. Mahler had died six months earlier, on 18 May. One of the earliest performances in London (possibly the first) occurred in January 1913 at the Queen's Hall under conductor Henry Wood, where it was sung by Gervase Elwes and Doris Woodall. Wood reportedly thought that the work was "excessively modern but very beautiful".

== Instrumentation ==
Mahler had already included movements for voice and orchestra in his Second, Third, Fourth and Eighth Symphonies. However, Das Lied von der Erde is the first complete integration of song cycle form with that of the symphony. The form was afterwards imitated by other composers, notably by Shostakovich and Zemlinsky. This new form has been termed a "song-symphony", a hybrid of the two forms that had occupied most of Mahler's creative life.

Das Lied von der Erde is scored for a large orchestra, consisting of the following:

Woodwinds
piccolo
3 flutes (3rd doubling piccolo)
3 oboes (3rd doubling cor anglais)
4 clarinets (3 B♭, E♭ and bass clarinet)
3 bassoons (3rd doubling contrabassoon)

Brass
4 horns
3 trumpets
3 trombones
1 tuba (only in "Von der Schönheit")

Percussion
4 timpani (only in "Von der Schönheit")
bass drum
cymbals
triangle
tambourine (only in "Von der Schönheit")
tam-tam (only in "Der Abschied")
glockenspiel

Keyboards
celesta (only in "Der Abschied")

Voices
alto solo
tenor solo

Strings
mandolin
2 harps

1st violins
2nd violins
violas
cellos
double basses (with low C string)

Only in the first, fourth and sixth songs does the full orchestra play together. The celesta is only heard at the end of the finale, and only the first movement requires all three trumpets, with two playing in the fourth movement, one playing in the third and fifth, and none playing in the second and sixth. In many places the texture resembles chamber music, with only a few instruments being used at one time. The score calls for tenor and alto soloists. However, at the alto's entry in the second movement, Mahler includes the note that "if necessary, the alto part may be sung by a baritone". It remains doubtful whether Mahler's comment regarding the second movement can be applied without hesitation to the fourth and sixth movements. Mahler also arranged the work for piano accompaniment. Another uncertainty concerns the third Lied; in the short score and the piano version Mahler considered an alternative setting with soprano instead of tenor.

== Movements ==
=== 1. "Das Trinklied vom Jammer der Erde" ===
The first movement, "The Drinking Song of Earth's Misery" (in A minor), continually returns to the refrain, Dunkel ist das Leben, ist der Tod (literally, "Dark is life, is death"), which is pitched a semitone higher on each successive appearance.

Like many drinking poems by Li Bai, the original poem "Bei Ge Xing" (The Song of Sorrow) (Chinese: 悲歌行) mixes drunken exaltation with a deep sadness. The singer's part is notoriously demanding, since the tenor has to struggle at the top of his range against the power of the full orchestra. This gives the voice its shrill, piercing quality, and is consistent with Mahler's practice of pushing instruments, including vocal cords, to their limits. According to musicologist Theodor W. Adorno, the tenor should here create the impression of a "denatured voice in the Chinese (falsetto) style".

The movement begins with a three-note horn call which recurs throughout the song, most notably at the climax in which the singer describes an ape calling "into the sweet fragrance of life." The climax also marks the first of the three whole-tone passages that occur in the symphony.

=== 2. "Der Einsame im Herbst" ===
"The lonely one in Autumn" (for alto, in D minor) is a much softer, less turbulent movement. Marked "somewhat dragging and exhausted", it begins with a repetitive shuffling in the strings, followed by solo wind instruments. The lyrics, which are based on the first part of a Tang dynasty era poem by Qian Qi, lament the dying of flowers and the passing of beauty, as well as expressing an exhausted longing for sleep. The orchestration in this movement is sparse and chamber music-like, with long and independent contrapuntal lines.

=== 3. "Von der Jugend" ===
The third movement, "Of Youth" (for tenor, in B♭ major), is the most obviously pentatonic and faux-Asian. The form is ternary, the third part being a greatly abbreviated version of the first. It is also the shortest of the six movements, and can be considered a first scherzo.

=== 4. "Von der Schönheit" ===
The music of this movement, "Of Beauty" (for alto, in G major), is mostly soft and legato, meditating on the image of some "young girls picking lotus flowers at the riverbank." Later in the movement there is a louder, more articulated section in the brass as the young men ride by on their horses. There is a long orchestral postlude to the sung passage, as the most beautiful of the young maidens looks longingly after the most handsome of the young men. The original text used in this movement derives from another poem by the Tang dynasty poet Li Bai, known as the "Lotus-collecting Song" (Chinese: 采蓮曲)

=== 5. "Der Trunkene im Frühling" ===
The second scherzo of the work is provided by the fifth movement, "The drunken man in Spring" (for tenor, in A major). Like the first, it opens with a horn theme. In this movement Mahler uses an extensive variety of key signatures, which can change as often as every few measures. The middle section features a solo violin and solo flute, which represent the bird the singer describes.

=== 6. "Der Abschied" ===
The final movement, "The Farewell" (for alto, in C minor ending in C major), is nearly as long as the previous five movements combined. Its text is drawn from two different poems, both involving the theme of leave-taking. Mahler himself added the last lines. This final song is also notable for its text-painting, using a mandolin to represent the singer's lute, imitating bird calls with woodwinds, and repeatedly switching between the major and minor modes to articulate sharp contrasts in the text.

The movement is divided into three major sections. In the first, the singer describes the nature around her as night falls. In the second, she is waiting for her friend to say a final farewell. A long orchestral interlude precedes the third section, which depicts the exchange between the two friends and fades off into silence.

Lines 1–3, 17–19, and 26–28 are all sung to the same music, with a pedal point in the low strings and soft strokes of the tam-tam; in the first two of these sections, a countermelody in the flute imitates the song of a bird, but the third of these sections is just the bare pedal point and tam-tam. The singer repeats the final word of the song, ewig ("forever"), like a mantra, accompanied by sustained chords in the orchestra, which features mandolin, harps, and celesta. Ewig is repeated as the music fades into silence, the final sixth chord "printed on the atmosphere" as Benjamin Britten asserted.

It is also worth noting that throughout Das Lied von der Erde there is a persistent message that "The earth will stay beautiful forever, but man cannot live for even a hundred years." At the end of "Der Abschied," however, Mahler adds three original lines which repeat this, but purposefully omit the part saying that "man must die". Conductor and composer Leonard Bernstein asserts that this ties in with the Eastern idea of Nirvana, in that the "soul" of the singer, as she or he dies, becomes one with the everlasting earth.

The last movement is very difficult to conduct because of its cadenza-like writing for voice and solo instruments, which often flows over the barlines. Mahler specifically instructed the movement to be played Ohne Rücksicht auf das Tempo (Without regard for the tempo). Bruno Walter related that Mahler showed him the score of this movement and asked about one passage, "Can you think of a way of conducting that? Because I can't." Mahler also hesitated to put the piece before the public because of its relentless negativity, unusual even for him. "Won't people go home and shoot themselves?" he asked.

== Text ==
Mahler's source for the text was Hans Bethge's Die chinesische Flöte (1907). Bethge's poems were free adaptations ("Nachdichtungen") of classical Chinese poetry based on prior prose translations into German (Hans Heilmann's Chinesische Lyrik, 1905) and French (Marquis d'Hervey de Saint Denys' Poésies de l'époque des Thang, 1862 and Judith Gautier's Livre de Jade, 1867/1902).

Four of the songs—"Das Trinklied vom Jammer der Erde", "Von der Jugend", "Von der Schönheit" and "Der Trunkene im Frühling"—were derived from poems written by Li Bai, the wandering poet of the Tang dynasty. "Der Einsame im Herbst" is based on a poem "After Long Autumn Night" by Qian Qi, another poet of the Tang dynasty. "Der Abschied" combines poems by Tang dynasty poets Meng Haoran and Wang Wei, with several additional lines by Mahler himself. These attributions have been a matter of some uncertainty, and around the turn of the 21st century, Chinese scholars extensively debated the sources of the songs following a performance of the work in China in 1998.

According to the musicologist Theodor W. Adorno, Mahler found in Chinese poetry what he had formerly sought after in the genre of German folk song: a mask or costume for the sense of rootlessness or "otherness" attending his identity as a Jew. This theme, and its influence upon Mahler's tonality, has been further explored by John Sheinbaum. It has also been asserted that Mahler found in these poems an echo of his own increasing awareness of mortality.

The Universal Edition score of 1912 for Das Lied von der Erde shows Mahler's adapted text as follows.

=== 1. "Das Trinklied vom Jammer der Erde" ("The Drinking Song of Earth's Sorrow") ===
Schon winkt der Wein im gold'nen Pokale,
Doch trinkt noch nicht, erst sing' ich euch ein Lied!
Das Lied vom Kummer
Soll auflachend in die Seele euch klingen.
Wenn der Kummer naht,
Liegen wüst die Gärten der Seele,
Welkt hin und stirbt die Freude, der Gesang.
Dunkel ist das Leben, ist der Tod.

Herr dieses Hauses!
Dein Keller birgt die Fülle des goldenen Weins!
Hier, diese Laute nenn' ich mein!
Die Laute schlagen und die Gläser leeren,
Das sind die Dinge, die zusammen passen.
Ein voller Becher Weins zur rechten Zeit
Ist mehr wert, als alle Reiche dieser Erde!
Dunkel ist das Leben, ist der Tod!

Das Firmament blaut ewig und die Erde
Wird lange fest steh'n und aufblüh'n im Lenz.
Du aber, Mensch, wie lang lebst denn du?
Nicht hundert Jahre darfst du dich ergötzen
An all dem morschen Tande dieser Erde!

Seht dort hinab! Im Mondschein auf den Gräbern
Hockt eine wild-gespenstische Gestalt –
Ein Aff' ist's! Hört ihr, wie sein Heulen
Hinausgellt in den süßen Duft des Lebens!

Jetzt nehmt den Wein! Jetzt ist es Zeit, Genossen!
Leert eure gold'nen Becher zu Grund!
Dunkel ist das Leben, ist der Tod!

The wine beckons in golden goblets
but drink not yet; first I'll sing you a song.
The song of sorrow
shall ring laughingly in your soul.
When the sorrow comes,
blasted lie the gardens of the soul,
wither and perish joy and singing.
Dark is life, dark is death!

Master of this house,
your cellar is full of golden wine!
Here, this lute I call mine.
The lute to strike and the glasses to drain,
these things go well together.
A full goblet of wine at the right time
is worth more than all the kingdoms of this earth.
Dark is life, dark is death!

The heavens are ever blue and the Earth
shall stand sure, and blossom in the spring.
But you O man, what long life have you?
Not a hundred years may you delight
in all the rotten baubles of this earth.

See down there! In the moonlight, on the graves
squats a wild ghostly shape;
an ape it is! Hear you his howl go out
in the sweet fragrance of life.

Now! Drink the wine! Now it is time comrades.
Drain your golden goblets to the last.
Dark is life, dark is death!

(Chinese original version of this poem: 悲歌行.

=== 2. "Der Einsame im Herbst" ("The Solitary One in Autumn") ===
Herbstnebel wallen bläulich überm See;
Vom Reif bezogen stehen alle Gräser;
Man meint, ein Künstler habe Staub von Jade
Über die feinen Blüten ausgestreut.

Der süße Duft der Blumen ist verflogen;
Ein kalter Wind beugt ihre Stengel nieder.
Bald werden die verwelkten, gold'nen Blätter
Der Lotosblüten auf dem Wasser zieh'n.

Mein Herz ist müde. Meine kleine Lampe
Erlosch mit Knistern, es gemahnt mich an den Schlaf.
Ich komm' zu dir, traute Ruhestätte!
Ja, gib mir Ruh', ich hab' Erquickung not!

Ich weine viel in meinen Einsamkeiten.
Der Herbst in meinem Herzen währt zu lange.
Sonne der Liebe willst du nie mehr scheinen,
Um meine bittern Tränen mild aufzutrocknen?

Autumn fog creeps bluishly over the lake.
Every blade of grass stands frosted.
As though an artist had jade-dust
over the fine flowers strewn.

The sweet fragrance of flower has passed;
A cold wind bows their stems low.
Soon will the wilted, golden petals
of lotus flowers upon the water float.

My heart is tired. My little lamp
expired with a crackle, minding me to sleep.
I come to you, trusted resting place.
Yes, give me rest, I have need of refreshment!

I weep often in my loneliness.
Autumn in my heart lingers too long.
Sun of love, will you no longer shine
Gently to dry up my bitter tears?

=== 3. "Von der Jugend" ("Of Youth") ===
Mitten in dem kleinen Teiche
Steht ein Pavillon aus grünem
Und aus weißem Porzellan.

Wie der Rücken eines Tigers
Wölbt die Brücke sich aus Jade
Zu dem Pavillon hinüber.

In dem Häuschen sitzen Freunde,
Schön gekleidet, trinken, plaudern.
Manche schreiben Verse nieder.

Ihre seidnen Ärmel gleiten
Rückwärts, ihre seidnen Mützen
Hocken lustig tief im Nacken.

Auf des kleinen Teiches stiller
Wasserfläche zeigt sich alles
Wunderlich im Spiegelbilde.

Alles auf dem Kopfe stehend
In dem Pavillon aus grünem
Und aus weißem Porzellan;

Wie ein Halbmond steht die Brücke,
Umgekehrt der Bogen. Freunde,
Schön gekleidet, trinken, plaudern.

In the middle of the little pond
stands a pavilion of green
and white porcelain.

Like the back of a tiger
arches the jade bridge
over to the pavilion.

Friends sit in the little house
well dressed, drinking, chatting.
some writing verses.

Their silk sleeves glide
backwards, their silk caps
rest gaily at the napes of their necks.

On the small pond's still
surface, everything shows
whimsical in mirror image.

Everything stands on its head
in the pavilion of green
and white porcelain.

Like a half-moon is the bridge
its arch upturned. Friends
well dressed, drinking, chatting.

=== 4. "Von der Schönheit" ("Of Beauty") ===
Junge Mädchen pflücken Blumen,
Pflücken Lotosblumen an dem Uferrande.
Zwischen Büschen und Blättern sitzen sie,
Sammeln Blüten in den Schoß und rufen
Sich einander Neckereien zu.

Gold'ne Sonne webt um die Gestalten,
Spiegelt sie im blanken Wasser wider,
Sonne spiegelt ihre schlanken Glieder,
Ihre süßen Augen wider,
Und der Zephir hebt mit Schmeichelkosen
Das Gewebe Ihrer Ärmel auf,
Führt den Zauber
Ihrer Wohlgerüche durch die Luft.

O sieh, was tummeln sich für schöne Knaben
Dort an dem Uferrand auf mut'gen Rossen?
Weithin glänzend wie die Sonnenstrahlen;
Schon zwischen dem Geäst der grünen Weiden
Trabt das jungfrische Volk einher!

Das Roß des einen wiehert fröhlich auf
Und scheut und saust dahin,
Über Blumen, Gräser wanken hin die Hufe,
Sie zerstampfen jäh im Sturm die hingesunk'nen Blüten,
Hei! Wie flattern im Taumel seine Mähnen,
Dampfen heiß die Nüstern!

Gold'ne Sonne webt um die Gestalten,
Spiegelt sie im blanken Wasser wider.
Und die schönste von den Jungfrau'n sendet
Lange Blicke ihm der Sehnsucht nach.
Ihre stolze Haltung ist nur Verstellung.
In dem Funkeln ihrer großen Augen,
In dem Dunkel ihres heißen Blicks
Schwingt klagend noch die Erregung ihres Herzens nach.

Young girls picking flowers,
Picking lotus flowers at the riverbank.
Amid bushes and leaves they sit,
gathering flowers in their laps and calling
one another in raillery.

Golden sun plays about their form
reflecting them in the clear water.
The sun reflects back their slender limbs,
their sweet eyes,
and the breeze teasing up
the warp of their sleeves,
directs the magic
of perfume through the air.

O see, what a tumult of handsome boys
there on the shore on their spirited horses.
Yonder shining like the sun's rays
between the branches of green willows
trot along the bold companions.

The horse of one neighs happily on
and shies and rushes there,
hooves shaking down blooms, grass,
trampling wildly the fallen flowers.
Hei! How frenzied his mane flutters,
and hotly steam his nostrils!

Golden sun plays about their form
reflecting them in the clear water.
And the most beautiful of the maidens sends
long looks adoring at him.
Her proud pose is but a pretense;
in the flash of her big eyes,
in the darkness of her ardent gaze
beats longingly her burning heart.

(Chinese original version of this poem: 采蓮曲 (李白) ( Wikisource).

=== 5. "Der Trunkene im Frühling" ("The Drunkard in Spring") ===
Wenn nur ein Traum das Leben ist,
Warum denn Müh' und Plag'!?
Ich trinke, bis ich nicht mehr kann,
Den ganzen, lieben Tag!

Und wenn ich nicht mehr trinken kann,
Weil Kehl' und Seele voll,
So tauml' ich bis zu meiner Tür
Und schlafe wundervoll!

Was hör' ich beim Erwachen? Horch!
Ein Vogel singt im Baum.
Ich frag' ihn, ob schon Frühling sei,
Mir ist als wie im Traum.

Der Vogel zwitschert: Ja!
Der Lenz ist da, sei kommen über Nacht!
Aus tiefstem Schauen lauscht' ich auf,
Der Vogel singt und lacht!

Ich fülle mir den Becher neu
Und leer' ihn bis zum Grund
Und singe, bis der Mond erglänzt
Am schwarzen Firmament!

Und wenn ich nicht mehr singen kann,
So schlaf' ich wieder ein.
Was geht mich denn der Frühling an!?
Laßt mich betrunken sein!

If life is but a dream,
why work and worry?
I drink until I no more can,
the whole, blessed day!

And if I can drink no more
as throat and soul are full,
then I stagger to my door
and sleep wonderfully!

What do I hear on waking? Hark!
A bird sings in the tree.
I ask him if it's spring already;
to me it's as if I'm in a dream.

The bird chirps Yes!
The spring is here, it came overnight!
From deep wonderment I listen;
the bird sings and laughs!

I fill my cup anew
and drink it to the bottom
and sing until the moon shines
in the black firmament!

And if I can not sing,
then I fall asleep again.
What to me is spring?
Let me be drunk!

(Chinese original version of this poem: 春日醉起言志 ( Wikisource).

=== 6. "Der Abschied" ("The Farewell") ===
Die Sonne scheidet hinter dem Gebirge.
In alle Täler steigt der Abend nieder
Mit seinen Schatten, die voll Kühlung sind.
O sieh! Wie eine Silberbarke schwebt
Der Mond am blauen Himmelssee herauf.
Ich spüre eines feinen Windes Weh'n
Hinter den dunklen Fichten!

Der Bach singt voller Wohllaut durch das Dunkel.
Die Blumen blassen im Dämmerschein.
Die Erde atmet voll von Ruh' und Schlaf.
Alle Sehnsucht will nun träumen,
Die müden Menschen geh'n heimwärts,
Um im Schlaf vergess'nes Glück
Und Jugend neu zu lernen!
Die Vögel hocken still in ihren Zweigen.
Die Welt schläft ein!

Es wehet kühl im Schatten meiner Fichten.
Ich stehe hier und harre meines Freundes;
Ich harre sein zum letzten Lebewohl.
Ich sehne mich, o Freund, an deiner Seite
Die Schönheit dieses Abends zu genießen.
Wo bleibst du? Du läßt mich lang allein!
Ich wandle auf und nieder mit meiner Laute
Auf Wegen, die von weichem Grase schwellen.
O Schönheit! O ewigen Liebens – Lebens – trunk'ne Welt!

Er stieg vom Pferd und reichte ihm den Trunk
Des Abschieds dar.
Er fragte ihn, wohin er führe
Und auch warum es müßte sein.
Er sprach, seine Stimme war umflort. Du, mein Freund,
Mir war auf dieser Welt das Glück nicht hold!
Wohin ich geh'? Ich geh', ich wand're in die Berge.
Ich suche Ruhe für mein einsam Herz.
Ich wandle nach der Heimat, meiner Stätte.
Ich werde niemals in die Ferne schweifen.
Still ist mein Herz und harret seiner Stunde!
Die liebe Erde allüberall
Blüht auf im Lenz und grünt aufs neu!
Allüberall und ewig blauen licht die Fernen!
Ewig... ewig...

The sun departs behind the mountains.
In all the valleys the evening descends
with its shadow, full cooling.
O look! Like a silver boat sails
the moon in the watery blue heaven.
I sense the fine breeze stirring
behind the dark pines.

The brook sings out clear through the darkness.
The flowers pale in the twilight.
The earth breathes, in full rest and sleep.
All longing now becomes a dream.
Weary men traipse homeward
to sleep; forgotten happiness
and youth to rediscover.
The birds roost silent in their branches.
The world falls asleep.

It blows coolly in the shadows of my pines.
I stand here and wait for my friend;
I wait to bid him a last farewell.
I yearn, my friend, at your side
to enjoy the beauty of this evening.
Where are you? You leave me long alone!
I walk up and down with my lute
on paths swelling with soft grass.
O beauty! O eternal loving-and-life-bedrunken world!

He dismounted and handed him the drink
of farewell.
He asked him where he would go
and why must it be.
He spoke, his voice was quiet. Ah my friend,
Fortune was not kind to me in this world!
Where do I go? I go, I wander in the mountains.
I seek peace for my lonely heart.
I wander homeward, to my abode!
I'll never wander far.
Still is my heart, awaiting its hour.
The dear earth everywhere
blossoms in spring and grows green anew!
Everywhere and forever blue is the horizon!
Forever ... Forever ...

== Recordings ==
=== Orchestra, female and male soloists ===
- Vladimir Ashkenazy, with Lilli Paasikivi and Stuart Skelton, Sydney Symphony Orchestra (Sydney Symphony Live SSO201004)
- Marc Albrecht, with Alice Coote and Burkhard Fritz, Netherlands Philharmonic Orchestra (Pentatone 3530480)
- Daniel Barenboim, with Waltraud Meier and Siegfried Jerusalem, Chicago Symphony Orchestra (Erato CD D-2292-45624-2)
- Eduard van Beinum, with Nan Merriman and Ernst Haefliger, Concertgebouw Orchestra, Amsterdam (Decca Eloquence 482 8147, CD reissue)
- Leonard Bernstein, with Christa Ludwig and René Kollo, Israel Philharmonic Orchestra (Sony CD 88697806222)
- Gary Bertini, with Marjana Lipovšek and Ben Heppner, Cologne Radio Symphony Orchestra (EMI Classics 0946 3 40238 2 5, 11-CD box set)
- Pierre Boulez, with Violeta Urmana and Michael Schade, Vienna Philharmonic (DGG, CD E4695262)
- Jean-Claude Casadesus, with Violeta Urmana and Clifton Forbis, Orchestre National de Lille (Evidence Classics EVCD057)
- Colin Davis, with Jessye Norman and Jon Vickers, London Symphony Orchestra (Philips 441 474-2)
- Dietrich Fischer-Dieskau, with Yvi Jänicke and Christian Elsner, Stuttgart Radio Symphony Orchestra (Orfeo C494001B; live recording from 1996)
- Ádám Fischer, with Anna Larsson and Stuart Skelton, Düsseldorf Symphony Orchestra (Avi Music AVI8553407)
- Iván Fischer, with Gerhild Romberger and Robert Dean Smith, Budapest Festival Orchestra (Channel Classics CCS SA 40020)
- Michael Gielen, with Cornelia Kalisch and Siegfried Jerusalem, SWR Sinfonieorchester Baden-Baden und Freiburg (SWR Music 93.269)
- Carlo Maria Giulini, with Brigitte Fassbaender and Francisco Araiza, Berlin Philharmonic (DGG CD 413 459-2)
- Carlo Maria Giulini, with Brigitte Fassbaender and Francisco Araiza, Berlin Philharmonic (Testament Records SBT1465; live recording from February 1984)
- Carlo Maria Giulini, with Brigitte Fassbaender and Francisco Araiza, Vienna Philharmonic (Orfeo C 654 052 B; live recording from 2 August 1987)
- Hans Graf, with Jane Henschel and Gregory Kunde, Houston Symphony (Naxos 8.527498)
- Bernard Haitink, with Janet Baker and James King, Concertgebouw Orchestra, Amsterdam, 1975 (Philips LP 6500 831)
- Michael Halász, with Ruxandra Donose and Thomas Harper, National Symphony Orchestra of Ireland (Naxos 8.550933)
- Jascha Horenstein, with Alfreda Hodgson and John Mitchinson, BBC Northern Symphony Orchestra (BBC Legends BBC 4042)
- Eliahu Inbal, with Jard van Nes and Peter Schreier, Frankfurt Radio Symphony (Denon 72605) (1988)
- Eliahu Inbal, with Iris Vermillion and Robert Gambill, Tokyo Metropolitan Symphony Orchestra (Exton OVCL-00473) (live recording 2012)
- Eugen Jochum, with Nan Merriman and Ernst Haefliger, Concertgebouw Orchestra, Amsterdam (DGG 289 46362822)
- Vladimir Jurowski, with Dame Sarah Connolly and Robert Dean Smith, Berlin Radio Symphony Orchestra (Pentatone PTC 5186 760)
- Herbert von Karajan, with Christa Ludwig and René Kollo, Berlin Philharmonic (DGG CD 419 058-2)
- Herbert Kegel, with Věra Soukupová and Reiner Goldberg, Leipzig Radio Symphony Orchestra (Weitblick SSS0052-2)
- Rudolf Kempe, with Janet Baker and Ludovic Speiss, BBC Symphony Orchestra (BBC Legends BBCL41292)
- Carlos Kleiber, with Christa Ludwig and Waldemar Kmentt, Vienna Symphony (live recording from 1967)
- Otto Klemperer, with Christa Ludwig and Fritz Wunderlich, New Philharmonia and Philharmonia Orchestras (HMV LP Angel Series SAN 179)
- Otto Klemperer, with Elsa Cavelti and Anton Dermota, Vienna Symphony (Vox Legends CDX2-5521 [2-CD reissue])
- Paul Kletzki, with Oralia Domínguez and Set Svanholm, Vienna Symphony (Orfeo C748071B; live recording from 12 November 1954)
- Josef Krips, with Anna Reynolds and Jess Thomas, Vienna Symphony (Orfeo C278921B; live recording)
- Rafael Kubelík, with Janet Baker and Waldemar Kmentt, Symphonie-Orchester des Bayerischen Rundfunks (Audite B0000669K1)
- Rafael Kubelík, with Hilde Rössel-Majdan and Waldemar Kmentt, Vienna Philharmonic (Orfeo C820102B; live recording from 30 August 1959)
- Raymond Leppard, with Janet Baker and John Mitchinson, BBC Northern Symphony (BBC Legends BBCL 4243-2)
- James Levine, with Jessye Norman and Siegfried Jerusalem, Berlin Philharmonic (DG 289 439-948-2)
- Lorin Maazel, with Waltraud Meier and Ben Heppner, Symphonie-Orchester des Bayerischen Rundfunks (RCA Red Seal 74321 67957 2)
- Anton Nanut, with Glenys Linos and Zeger Vandersteene, RTV Slovenia Symphony Orchestra, (Pilz CD 160 124)
- Yannick Nézet-Séguin, with Sarah Connolly and Toby Spence, London Philharmonic Orchestra (LPO-0073)
- Eugene Ormandy, with Lili Chookasian and Richard Lewis, Philadelphia Orchestra (Sony CD SBK 53518)
- Eiji Oue, with Michelle DeYoung and Jon Villars, Minnesota Orchestra (Reference Recordings RR-88CD)
- Sir Simon Rattle, with Magdalena Kožená and Stuart Skelton, Bavarian Radio Symphony Orchestra (BR Klassik 900172)
- Fritz Reiner, with Maureen Forrester and Richard Lewis, Chicago Symphony Orchestra (RCA 60178-2-RG)
- Hans Rosbaud, with Grace Hoffman and Helmut Melchert, SWR Sinfonieorchester Baden-Baden (Vox Turnabout LP, TV 34220S)
- Sir Georg Solti, with Marjana Lipovšek and Thomas Moser, Royal Concertgebouw Orchestra (Decca 440 314-2)
- Sir Georg Solti, with Yvonne Minton and René Kollo, Chicago Symphony Orchestra (Decca CD 414 066-2)
- Kurt Sanderling, with Birgit Finnilä and Peter Schreier, Berlin Symphony Orchestra (Berlin Classics 0094022BC)
- Carl Schuricht, with Kerstin Thorborg and Carl Martin Öhmann, Royal Concertgebouw Orchestra Amsterdam (October 1939 broadcast concert, live). (Bel Age CD, from acetates.)
- Martin Sieghart, with Christianne Stotijn and Donald Litaker, Het Gelders Orkest (Arnhem Philharmonic Orchestra) (Exton HGO0702)
- Giuseppe Sinopoli, with Iris Vermillion and Keith Lewis, Staatskapelle Dresden (DG 289 453 437-2)
- Walter Susskind, with Lili Chookasian and Richard Cassilly, Cincinnati Symphony Orchestra (Vox VU 9040)
- Klaus Tennstedt, with Agnes Baltsa and Klaus König, London Philharmonic Orchestra (EMI Classics 5 74849 2, 2-CD set)
- Bruno Walter, with Kathleen Ferrier and Julius Patzak, Vienna Philharmonic (Decca LP LXT 2721–2722) 1952. Remastered in 2003 by Mark Obert-Thorn (Naxos Historical 8.110871).
- Bruno Walter, with Kerstin Thorborg and Charles Kullman, Vienna Musikvereinsaal 1936 (live). (Columbia Records, 78 rpm, 7×12-inch Mahler Society Issue)
- Bruno Walter, with Elena Nikolaidi and Set Svanholm, 1953 (live) New York Philharmonic Orchestra (Archipel ARPCD 0139)
- Bruno Walter, with Mildred Miller and Ernst Haefliger, New York Philharmonic Orchestra (Sony CD SMK 64455)
- Long Yu, with Michelle DeYoung and Brian Jagde, Shanghai Symphony Orchestra (Deutsche Grammophon 289 483-745-2)
- Michael Zilm, with Jadwiga Rappé and Piotr Kusiewicz, Polish National Radio Symphony Orchestra Katowice (DUX 0810)
- David Zinman, with Susan Graham and Christian Elsner, Tonhalle-Orchester Zürich (RCA Red Seal 5438152)

=== Two male soloists ===
For the first few decades after the work's premiere, the option to perform it with two male soloists was little used. On one occasion, Bruno Walter tried it out and engaged Friedrich Weidemann, the baritone who had premiered Kindertotenlieder under Mahler's own baton in 1905. However, Walter felt that tenor and baritone did not work as well as tenor and alto, and he never repeated the experiment. Following the pioneering recordings of the work by baritone Dietrich Fischer-Dieskau under conductors Paul Kletzki and Leonard Bernstein, the use of baritones in this work has increased.

- Leonard Bernstein, with James King and Dietrich Fischer-Dieskau, Vienna Philharmonic (Decca CD 417 783-2)
- Bernard Haitink, with Christian Elsner and Christian Gerhaher, Berlin Philharmonic
- Paul Kletzki, with Murray Dickie and Dietrich Fischer-Dieskau, Philharmonia Orchestra (HMV LP SXLP 30165)
- Josef Krips, with Fritz Wunderlich and Dietrich Fischer-Dieskau, Vienna Symphony (DGG 289 477 8988 8; live recording from 1964)
- Kent Nagano, with Klaus Florian Vogt and Christian Gerhaher, Montreal Symphony Orchestra (Sony Classical 88697508212)
- Jonathan Nott, with Roberto Saccà and Stephen Gadd, Bamberger Symphoniker (Tudor 7202)
- Maxime Pascal, with Kévin Amiel and Stéphane Degout, Le Balcon (B Records LBM042)
- Simon Rattle, with Peter Seiffert and Thomas Hampson, City of Birmingham Symphony Orchestra (EMI Classics 5 56200)
- Esa-Pekka Salonen, with Plácido Domingo and Bo Skovhus, Los Angeles Philharmonic (Sony Classical 60646)
- Michael Tilson Thomas, with Stuart Skelton and Thomas Hampson, San Francisco Symphony (SFS Media 1206)

=== One male soloist ===
- Jonathan Nott, with Jonas Kaufmann, Vienna Philharmonic (Sony Classical B01MZZXR1G)

=== Piano accompaniment ===
- Brigitte Fassbaender (mezzo-soprano), Thomas Moser (tenor), Cyprien Katsaris (piano) (Warner Apex 2564681627 – reissue number). Katsaris has also performed this version in concert.
- Hermine Haselböck (mezzo-soprano), Bernhard Berchtold (tenor), Markus Vorzellner (piano). Recorded 2008 at the occasion of the 100th anniversary in the Kulturzentrum Toblach, in cooperation with the Gustav-Mahler-Musikweks Toblach 2008 (C-AVI MUSIC 4260085531257)
- Piotr Beczala (tenor), Christian Gerhaher (baritone), Gerold Huber (piano) (Sony Classical 19658795702)

=== Other versions ===
==== Schoenberg and Riehn arrangement ====
Arnold Schoenberg began to arrange Das Lied von der Erde for chamber orchestra, reducing the orchestral forces to string and wind quintets, and calling for piano, celesta and harmonium to supplement the harmonic texture. Three percussionists are also employed. Schoenberg never finished this project, but the arrangement was completed by Rainer Riehn in 1980.

- Osmo Vänskä, with Monica Groop and Jorma Silvasti, Sinfonia Lahti Chamber Ensemble (BIS CD-681).
- Robert H.P. Platz, with Ingrid Schmithüsen and Aldo Baldin, Ensemble Köln, Canterino 1031
- Mark Wigglesworth, with Jean Rigby and Robert Tear, Premiere Ensemble (RCA CD Dig-09026-68043-2)
- Kenneth Slowik, with John Elwes, Russell Braun, Smithsonian Chamber Players & Santa Fe Pro Musica (Dorian Recordings)
- Philippe Herreweghe, with Birgit Remmert, Hans Peter Blochwitz, Ensemble Musique Oblique (Harmonia Mundi HMA 1951477).
- George Manahan, with Jennifer Johnson Cano and Paul Groves, Orchestra of St. Luke's (St. Luke's Collection)
- Ken Selden, with Robert Breault and Richard Zeller, Martingale Ensemble (MSR Classics MS1406)
- Nicol Matt, with Anna Haase and Daniel Sans, European Chamber Soloists (Brilliant Classics 82192)
- Fabio Luisi, with Doris Soffel and Wolfgang Muller-Lorenz, MDR Symphony Orchestra (Querstand VKJK0428)
- Edward Carroll, with Miriam Murphy and Henry Moss, Royal Academy of Music Chamber Ensemble (Royal Academy of Music RAM 010 66108)
- Scott Tilley, with Timothy W. Sparks and Ellen Williams, Duraleigh Chamber Players (Centaur CRC3044)
- Douglas Boyd, with Jane Irwin and Peter Wedd, Manchester Camerata (Avie AV2195)
- Kenneth Woods, with Emma Curtis and Brennen Guillory, Orchestra of the Swan (Somm Recordings SOMMCD 0109)
- Linos Ensemble (no conductor identified), with Ivonne Fuchs and Markus Schäfer (Capriccio C5136)
- Oxalys (no conductor), with Margriet Van Reisen and André Post (Passacaille 0001066PAS)

==== 21st-century versions ====
- In 2004, Daniel Ng and Glen Cortese prepared a Cantonese version. The world premiere of this version was given on 14 August 2004 by the Chamber Orchestra Anglia at the British Library, conducted by Sharon Andrea Choa, with soloists Robynne Redmon and Warren Mok. It was performed again by the Singapore Symphony Orchestra on 22 July 2005, with mezzo Ning Liang and tenor Warren Mok, under the direction of Lan Shui.
- In 2004, the Octavian Society commissioned Glen Cortese to create two reductions of the work, one for a chamber ensemble of twenty instruments and one for a small orchestra with woodwinds and brass in pairs. Both these reductions are published in critical editions by Universal in Vienna.
- In 2020, a new arrangement for two soloists and a 15-piece chamber ensemble by Reinbert de Leeuw was recorded by the Belgian group Het Collectief with Lucile Richardot and Yves Saelens (Alpha Classics Alpha 633)

== Sources ==
- Adorno, Theodor W. (1960). Mahler: Eine musikalische Physiognomik. Suhrkamp.
- Adorno, Theodor W. (1966). Wagner – Mahler: Due Studi. Turin: Einaudi, Saggi.
- Bethge, Hans (2001) [1907]. Die Chinesische Flöte: Nachdichtungen von chinesischer Lyrik. Kelkheim: YinYang Media Verlag.
- Blom, Eric (1937). Mahler's 'Song of the Earth'. Introduction by Bruno Walter. Hayes (Middlesex): Columbia Graphophone Company.
- Chew, Teng-Leong (September 2004). "Perspectives: The Identity of the Chinese Poems Mahler adapted for 'Von der Jugend'" (PDF). Naturlaut. 3 (2): 15–17. Archived from the original (PDF) on 22 December 2006 – via Mahler Archive.
- Hamao, Fusako (Summer 1995). "The Sources of the Texts in Mahler's Lied von der Erde". 19th-Century Music. 19 (1): 83–94. doi:10.2307/746721. JSTOR 746721.
- Johnson, Julian (2005). "Mahler and the idea of Nature". In Jeremy Barham (ed.). Perspectives on Gustav Mahler. Aldershot: Ashgate. ISBN 978-0-7546-0709-0.
- Kennedy, Michael (1990) [1974]. The Dent Master Musicians: Mahler. London: Dent.
- Kennedy, Michael; Kennedy, Joyce Bourne, eds. (2007). Concise Oxford Dictionary of Music. London: Oxford University Press.
- Sheinbaum, John J. (2006). "Adorno's Mahler and the Timbral Outsider". Journal of the Royal Musical Association. 131 (1): 38–82. doi:10.1093/jrma/fkl002.
