= Hermine Haselböck =

Austrian mezzo-soprano (born 1967)

Hermine Haselböck (born 7 March 1967 in Melk, Lower Austria) is an Austrian mezzo-soprano in opera, concert and lied.

== Career ==
After graduating from Stiftsgymnasium Melk Haselböck studied with Rita Streich at the Vienna Music Academy and continued at the Hochschule für Musik Detmold, with Ingeborg Ruß, finishing with diplomas for both performing and vocal education. She received further vocal training by Brigitte Fassbaender, Sena Jurinac, Marjana Lipovšek, Christa Ludwig and Eva Randová, and took master classes with Kurt Equiluz, Kurt Widmer and Edith Sélig-Papée.

Her operatic career began with the role of Mercedes in Carmen when Nikolaus Harnoncourt discovered her for his production at styriarte in 2005. She performed Dorabella (Così fan tutte) at the Concertgebouw, Amsterdam, and the Second Lady (The Magic Flute) at the Mozart Festival Reinsberg, the Theater an der Wien and the Grand Théâtre de Luxembourg. 2006 she sang the role of La Morte in Erwin Schulhoff's Flammen. Two trouser roles followed, Hansel (Hansel and Gretel, Vienna Volksoper) and Ramiro (La finta giardiniera, National Opera Tokyo and Bruckner Festival Linz). In 2009 she first sang Magdalene (Die Meistersinger von Nürnberg), 2012 Brangäne (Tristan und Isolde) and 2013 Azucena (Il trovatore) at the Tyrolian Festival Erl and Gertrud/Mother, (Hansel and Gretel at the Graz Opera House. 2013 she debuted as Floßhilde (Das Rheingold) in the Sala Santa Cecilia in Rome and made 2014 her debut as Fricka in Das Rheingold and Die Walküre at the Tyrolian Festival Erl, Austria. In 2015 she performed Floßhilde in Das Rheingold with the Hong Kong Philharmonic Orchestra under the conduct of Jaap van Zweden. In 2015, she was singing the role of Fricka at the first staged performance of Das Rheingold and Die Walküre in Beijing and Shanghai. In 2016 followed the role of the daughter in the Austrian premiere of Ella Milch-Sheriff's Baruchs Schweigen at the EntarteOpera Festival, Vienna.

Haselböck has collaborated with orchestras such as the Vienna Symphony, the Munich Philharmonic, the Orchestra dell'Accademia Nazionale di Santa Cecilia, the Orchestre national de Lille, the RSO Vienna, the MDR Sinfonieorchester, the Hongkong Philharmonic Orchestra, the Residence Orchestra Den Haag, the Dresden Philharmonic, Budapest Philharmonic Orchestra, and under conductors such as Bertrand de Billy, Vladimir Fedoseyev, Rafael Frühbeck de Burgos, Martin Haselböck, Manfred Honeck, Gustav Kuhn, Fabio Luisi, Kirill Petrenko, Martin Sieghart, Jean-Christophe Spinosi, Christian Thielemann, Franz Welser-Möst, Jaap van Zweden.

Symphonic and lieder repertoire plays an important role, performed in the Brucknerhaus Linz, Carnegie Hall, Frauenkirche, Dresden, Gewandhaus, Konzerthaus, Vienna, Mozarteum Salzburg, Musikverein, Vienna, Musée d'Orsay, Paris, and Teatro di San Carlo, Naples. Her repertoire includes the major works by Bach, Haydn, Händel, Mendelssohn, Beethoven, Mahler, Mozart, Schubert, Zemlinsky (Maeterlinck Songs, Op. 13), Wagner (Wesendonck Lieder) and Verdi (Requiem).

Haselböck has long been active in vocal pedagogy. She taught voice at the Richard Wagner Conservatory in Vienna and has been guest professor of voice at the University of Music and Performing Arts Graz since 2017. In 2020, she expanded her teaching activities to include the Johann Joseph Fux Conservatory in Graz. From 2022 to 2024, she was professor of voice at the University of Music and Performing Arts Vienna (MDW). Since 2025, she has been a full professor of voice and head of the voice department at the University of Music and Performing Arts Graz (KUG). Her pedagogical work is further distinguished by her service on juries at international competitions and her leadership of masterclasses.

== Awards ==
In 2005, Haselböck was awarded for her debut CD Songs by Zemlinsky the International Zemlinsky Award at the Musikverein Vienna and the Pasticcio Prize of the Austrian classical radio station.

In 2014, Haselböck's CD recording of Gustav Mahler's Lieder eines fahrenden Gesellen, Kindertotenlieder, Rückert-Lieder, Russell Ryan, piano, 2011: bridge records 9341, received the Supersonic award of the magazine Pizzicato, Luxemburg.

== Discography ==
- Gustav Mahler: Symphony No. 2, Orchestre national de Lille, conductor Jean-Claude Casadesus, Olena Tokar, soprano, Philharmonic Choir of Brno, Petr Fiala, 2016, Evidence EVCD027
- Richard Wagner, Das Rheingold, (Floßhilde), Hong Kong Philharmonic Orchestra, Jaap van Zweden, Matthias Goerne, Michelle De Young, Peter Sidhom, Kwangchul Youn, Stephen Milling, Kim Begley, Anna Samuil, David Cangelosi, Deborah Humble, Oleksandr Pushniak, Eri Nakamura, 2015 NAXOS 8.660374-75
- Gustav Mahler: Lieder eines fahrenden Gesellen, Kindertotenlieder, Rückert-Lieder, Russell Ryan, piano, 2011: Bridge Records 9341
- Gustav Mahler: Lieder-Collectors edition, with Elisabeth Flechl, soprano, Wolfgang Holzmair, baritone, Alexander Kaimbacher, tenor, Angelika Kirchschlager, mezzo-soprano, Michael Kraus, baritone, Daniel Schmutzhard, baritone, Birgid Steinberger, soprano, Christopher Hinterhuber and Russell Ryan, piano, Christian Fennesz: Mahler Remix, Visuals: Annablume, Victoria Coeln, LIA, Lillevan, LWZ, Valence. 2011, music DVD, Departure 711956
- Hugo Wolf Lieder: Lieder-Collectors edition, with Birgid Steinberger, soprano, Bernhard Berchtold, tenor, Florian Boesch, bass-baritone, Wolfgang Holzmair, baritone, Angelika Kirchschlager, mezzo-soprano, Michaela Selinger, mezzo-soprano; Georg Beckmann and Russell Ryan, piano, visuals: Victoria Coeln, Timo Novotny, Luma.Launisch (Sound: Frame Lab), Claudia Rohrmoser; 2011, music DVD, Departure 711760
- Gustav Mahler: Das Lied von der Erde, with Bernhard Berchtold, tenor, Markus Vorzellner, piano original version for piano and high or middle voice. 2009: C-AVI Records 4260085531257
- Ludwig van Beethoven: Missa solemnis, Haydn Orchestre Bozen/Trient, conductor Gustav Kuhn), 2007: Col Legno 60011
- Songs of Franz Schreker, with Wolfgang Holzmair, baritone, Russel Ryan, piano, 2007: Bridge Records 9259
- Songs of Alexander Zemlinsky with Florian Henschel, piano, 2006 2nd edition Bridge Records 9244
- Songs of Alexander Zemlinsky with Florian Henschel, piano, 2003: Panclassics PC 10162
- Franz Schubert: Mass in A-flat major, Spirit of Europe, Martin Sieghart, 2007. ORF-N CD 034
- Ludwig van Beethoven: Symphony No. 9, Haydn Orchestra of Bozen and Trient, conductor Gustav Kuhn), 2006: Col Legno 60005
- Gaetano Donizetti: Adelia, (Odetta), Haydn Orchestra Bozen and Trient, conductor Gustav Kuhn
- George Frideric Handel: Judas Maccabaeus, Barucco Kammerorchester, conductor Heinz Ferlesch 2006 ORF SACD 2010059
