= Blauensteiner =

Blauensteiner is a surname. Notable people with the surname include:

- Elfriede Blauensteiner (1931–2003), Austrian serial killer
- Leopold Blauensteiner (1880–1947), Austrian academic painter
- Michael Blauensteiner (born 1995), Austrian footballer
