= Sara Cahier =

American-Swedish opera singer and teacher (1870–1951)

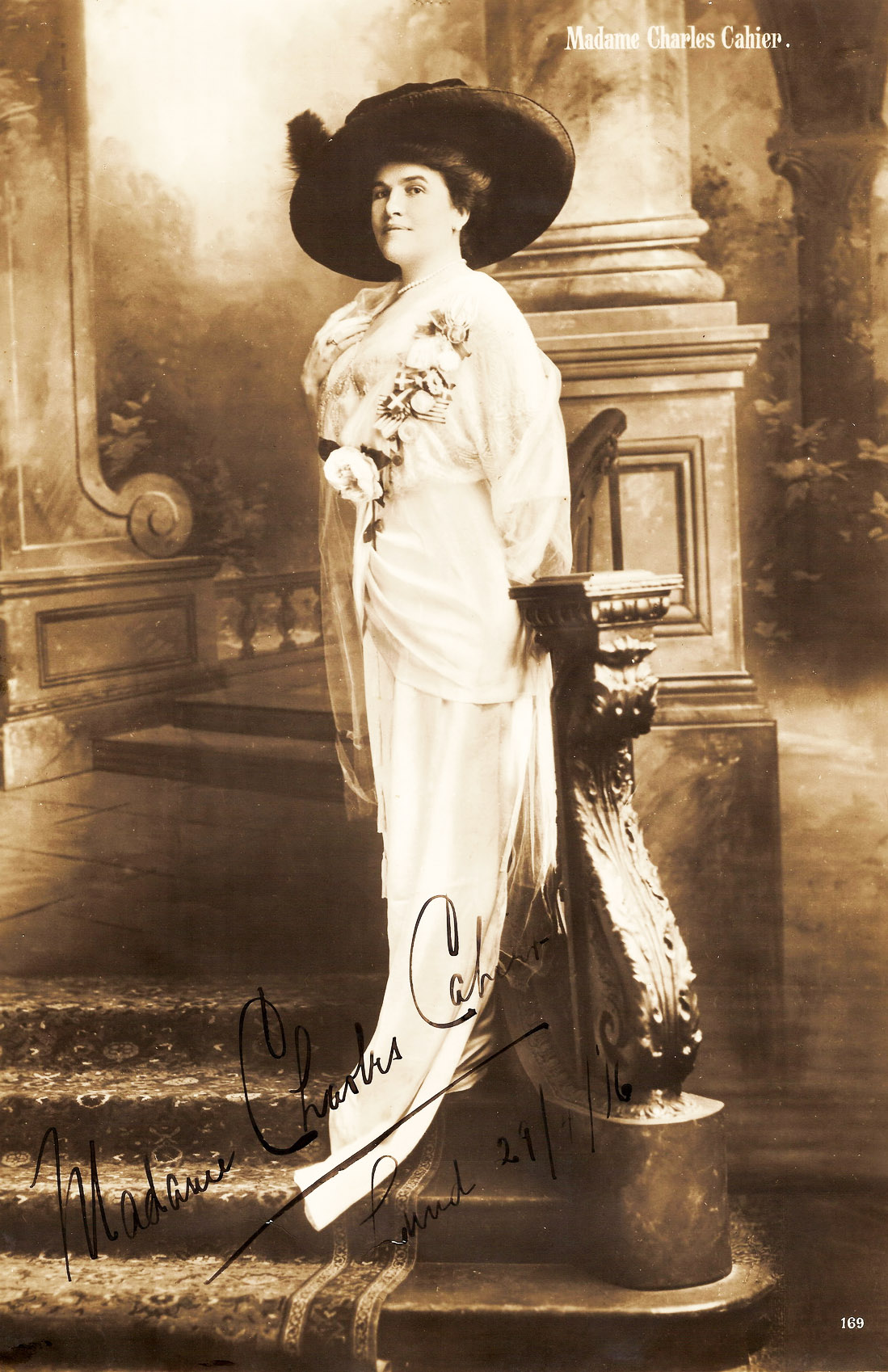
Signed portrait of Cahier

Sara Charles-Cahier or Madame Charles Cahier (born Sara Layton Walker; 8 January 1870 – 15 April 1951) was an American-born Swedish mezzo-soprano or contralto singer in opera and lieder, singing primarily in Europe. The American-born Cahier later acquired Swedish citizenship. She was associated with Gustav Mahler, and was one of the soloists in the posthumous premiere of his Das Lied von der Erde in 1911. She sang at the Metropolitan Opera in New York, and was a teacher at the Curtis Institute of Music in Philadelphia. Her students included Marian Anderson.

== Career ==
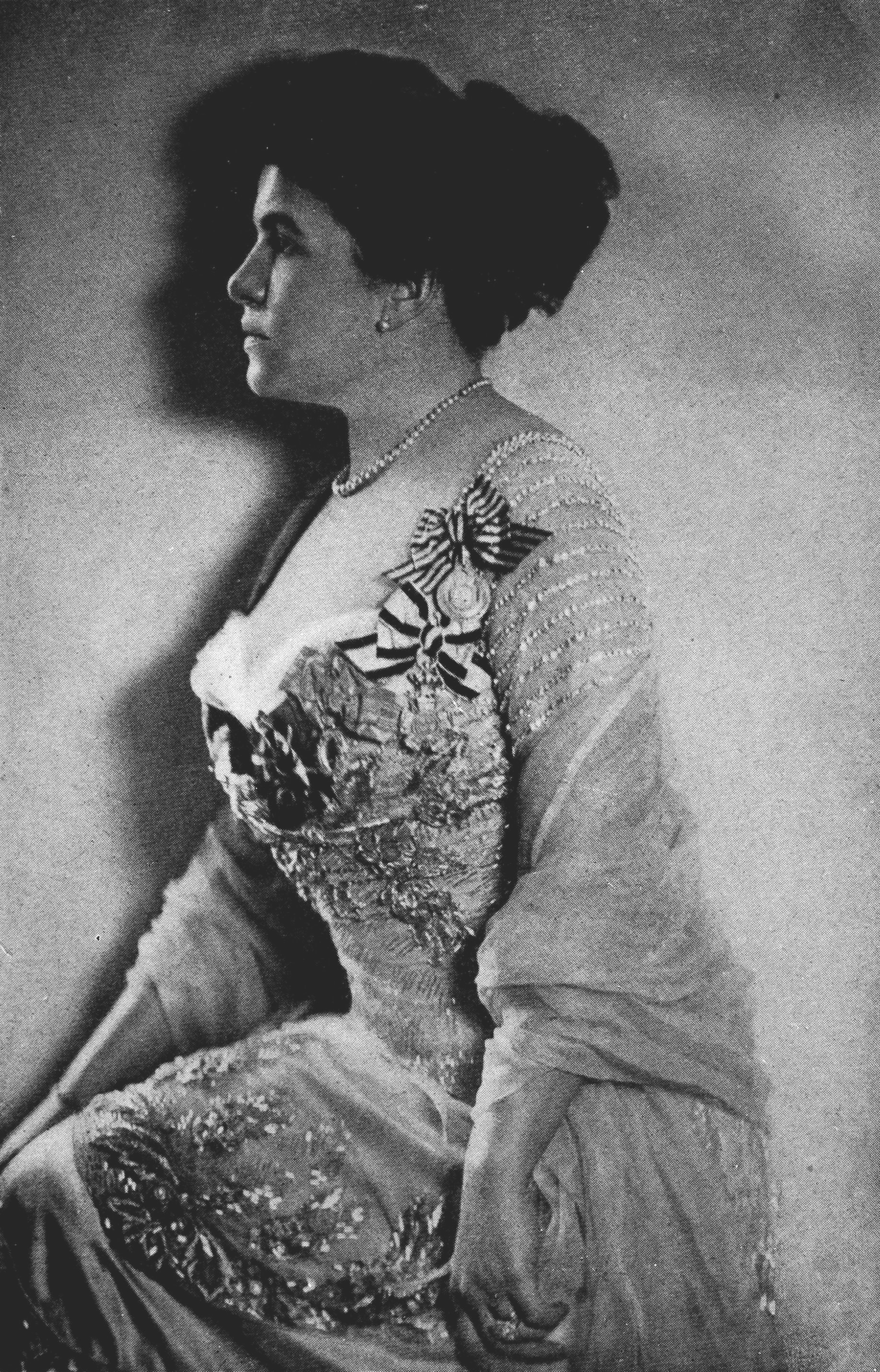
Cahier in 1912

She was born as Sara Layton Walker in Nashville, Tennessee. She studied in Indianapolis and in Paris under Jean de Reszke, and in 1904 she made her debut as the character Orpheus in Orpheus and Eurydice in Nice. Other teachers included Gustav Walter, Victor Capoul and Amalie Joachim.

Her second husband was Swedish impresario Charles Cahier, in 1905. After this, she was generally billed as "Madame Charles Cahier", or "Sara Charles-Cahier".

She was active in Vienna, joining the Hofoper in 1907, and Munich, often singing under Gustav Mahler's directorship in roles such as Amneris, Carmen, Delilah, Fidès, Ortrud, and Santuzza.

Cahier and fellow American William Miller, a tenor, were chosen by Bruno Walter to premiere Mahler's Das Lied von der Erde in Munich posthumously in November 1911. She also sang in the New York premiere of the work in 1922, with tenor Orville Harrold, under conductor Artur Bodanzky.

She sang in France, Italy, England and Germany. Other noted conductors under whom she sang included Edvard Grieg and Richard Strauss.

She sang at the Metropolitan Opera in New York from 1912 to 1914, making her debut there as Azucena in Il trovatore. Other appearances there included Fricka in Die Walküre, alongside Olive Fremstad and Margaret Matzenauer.

She enjoyed great success in Stockholm from 1915 to 1917, during which time she acquired Swedish citizenship. After retirement, she became a teacher and vocal coach, at the Curtis Institute of Music in Philadelphia. Her students, there and elsewhere, included Marian Anderson, Göta Ljungberg and Rosette Anday. It was on her advice that Lauritz Melchior changed from baritone to heldentenor.

Sara Cahier died in Manhattan Beach, California, in April 1951, aged 81.

== Recordings ==
Her recordings were few, but include:

- "Urlicht", from Mahler's Symphony No. 2 "Resurrection" and "Ich bin der Welt abhanden gekommen", from his Rückert-Lieder
- Excerpts from Carmen
