= Long Autumn Night =

Chinese classic poem

"Long Autumn Night" is a Chinese classic poem that has inspired later works of classical music in China and Europe.

== After Long Autumn Night by Qian Qi 錢起《效古秋夜長》from Tang Poems ==
Qian Qi (710–782) was a mid-Tang dynasty Chinese court poet known by contemporaries for elegant verses which are rich in meaning and loose in syntax. They could be interpreted in many ways. This poem was inspired by "Long Autumn Night" by Wang Yong 王融 of the 5th century. Gustav Mahler's choral symphony Das Lied von der Erde, 2nd movement, was based on this Tang poem about a lonely young girl at her silk loom in a wealthy household.

Autumn brings the white jade frost, North wind sweeps the lotus scent.
Pining with love she weaves by a flickering lamp, Tearful at the long cold loom,
Her cloud of finished gossamer green silk like a pool of quiet water, Until the moon and perched crow bring the dawn.
Who is this young girl faithfully weaving at her loom?
Hidden deep behind rich silken drapes, amidst the splendor listening to falling leaves.
I sympathize with her; cold in solitary desolation.

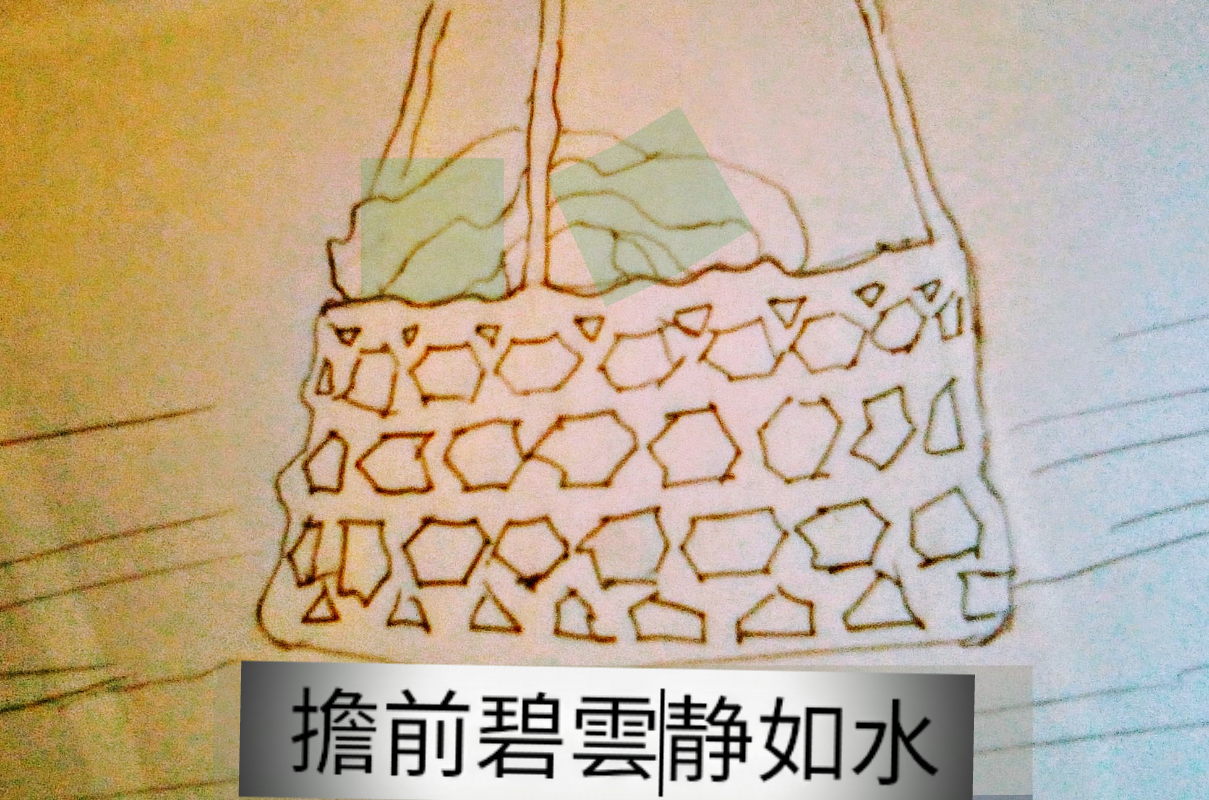

秋漢飛玉霜，北風掃荷香。
含情紡織孤燈盡，拭淚相思寒漏長。
簷前碧雲靜如水，月弔棲烏啼鳥起。
誰家少婦事鴛機，錦幕雲屏深掩扉。
白玉窗中聞落葉，應憐寒女獨無衣。

=== "Der Einsame im Herbst" ("The Solitary One in Autumn") ===
The second movement of Mahler's Das Lied von der Erde is based on this Qian Qi poem. The German choral text of the first two stanzas are given below:

Herbstnebel wallen bläulich überm See;
Vom Reif bezogen stehen alle Gräser;
Man meint, ein Künstler habe Staub von Jade
Über die feinen Blüten ausgestreut.
Der süße Duft der Blumen ist verflogen;
Ein kalter Wind beugt ihre Stengel nieder.
Bald werden die verwelkten, gold'nen Blätter
Der Lotosblüten auf dem Wasser zieh'n.

Full German choral text and English translation are in the wiki "Das Lied von der Erde ".

== Mystery of Das Lied von der Erde, Mahler ==
The German text for "Der Einsame im Herbst" ("The Solitary One in Autumn") was re-written from the 19th c. German translation of French translations of the poem. The Mahler choral text by necessity differs from the Hans Bethge German text (Bethge's "Die chinesische Flöte") since it must be set to music. The original Chinese poem was not identified for a long time. But now it is conclusively shown to be by Qian Qi, a mid-Tang dynasty poet and high-ranking official. The title is "After Long Autumn Night" 《效古秋夜長》.

=== Notes on Mystery of 2nd movement: 乐章之迷 ===
The German source used by Mahler was a translation from French translations. There were major errors in both the text translations and attributions so that the original poem in Chinese could not be identified. The first identification was published in 1983 by Qian Renkang 钱仁康 through style and subject matter analysis. This was confirmed in 1999 after an exhaustive backwards analysis of a large number of likely authors and texts. The second movement is now generally accepted as being based on this Qian Qi Tang poem.
