= Friedrich Weidemann =

German opera singer

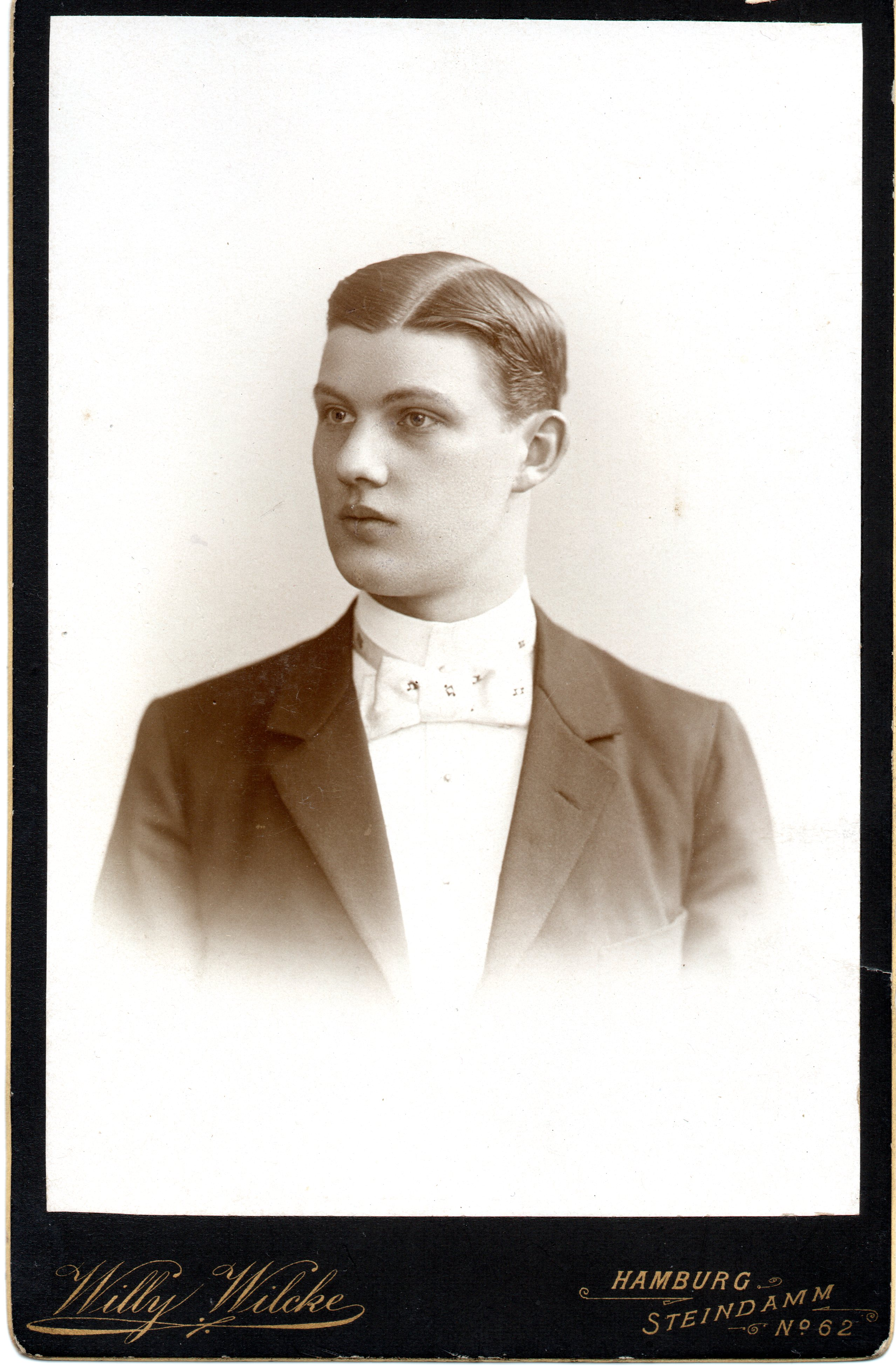
Friedrich Weidemann, ca. 1900, Photography by Willy Wilcke

Friedrich Weidemann (1 January 1871 – 30 January 1919) was a German baritone who was a leading singer at the Vienna Court Opera (Wiener Hofoper) from 1902 until his death in 1919.

== Biography ==
Weidemann was born in Ratzeburg, Germany in 1871.

He went to the Vienna Court Opera where he worked with Karl Weigl as a vocal coach.

While some sources site his first performances in Vienna taking place in 1903, the official archives of the Vienna State Opera list his debut on 20 September 1902 in the title role of Wagner's Der fliegende Holländer conducted by Bruno Walter. He would sing this role 49 times with this company, almost annually, through November 1918.

Weidmann sang over 60 roles at the Court Opera, including many leading roles in the standard repertoire as well as premieres of contemporary operas which are now forgotten. While he specialised in Wagner's operas (his most-performed role was Hans Sachs in Die Meistersinger von Nürnberg, which he sang more than 70 times), he was equally at home in the operas of Mozart and Verdi, and the then-new works of Puccini and Richard Strauss.

On 29 January 1905, he was the soloist in the world premiere of Gustav Mahler's Kindertotenlieder. This concert also included the premiere performance of "Der Tamboursg'sell", a late addition to Mahler's compendium Des Knaben Wunderhorn.

On one occasion, Walter engaged Weidemann for a performance of Mahler's Das Lied von der Erde using tenor and baritone. Mahler died in 1911 having never heard the work. He had specified in the score that the singers could be either tenor and contralto or tenor and baritone. However, Walter felt that tenor and baritone did not work as well as tenor and contralto, and he did not repeat the experiment.

Weidemann died in Vienna in 1919 at age 48.

== Recordings ==
Weidemann's voice can be heard in:

- "Was duftet doch der Flieder" from Wagner's Die Meistersinger von Nürnberg (1907)
- "Auf wolkigen Höhen" from Wagner's Siegfried
- "Wer Corneval's Ehr" from Wagner'sTristan und Isolde
- "Wotans Abschied" from Wagner'sDie Walküre
- "Ha, welch ein Augenblick" from Beethoven's Fidelio (1904)
- "O Mimì, tu più non torni" from Puccini's La bohème, with Leo Slezak (sung in German)
- "Du lässt mich kalt von hinnen scheiden", from Lortzing's Der Waffenschmied
- "Auf Gesellen" from Lortzing's Zar und Zimmermann
- The sextet from Donizetti's Lucia di Lammermoor
- "Ach lass dein Vaterherz" from Halévy's La Juive.
- Highlights from Goldmark's The Queen of Sheba
