= Qian Qi =

Chinese poet

Qian Qi (traditional Chinese: 錢起; simplified Chinese: 钱起; pinyin: Qián Qǐ; Wade–Giles: Ch'ien Ch'i; 710–782) was a Chinese poet of the Tang dynasty. Three of his poems have been included within the famous anthology Three Hundred Tang Poems. His courtesy name was Zhongwen (Chinese: 仲文; pinyin: Zhòngwén).

== Poetry ==
Qian Qi's poems as collected in Three Hundred Tang Poems were translated by Witter Bynner as:

- "Farewell to a Japanese Buddhist Priest Bound Homeward"
- "From my Study at the Mouth of the Valley. a Message to Censor Yang"
- "To my Friend at the Capital Secretary Pei"

Part of one of Qian Qi's poems was used by Gustav Mahler for the second movement, "Der Einsame im Herbst" (The Lonely Soul of Autumn), in his Das Lied von der Erde. He is credited under the name Chang Tsi as the author of the original Chinese text. The lyrics lament the dying of flowers and the passing of beauty. Other Tang poets whose works Mahler drew upon for this piece were Li Bai, Wang Wei, and Meng Haoran.

== Biography ==
Qian Qi flourished in the Wu region of China (modern day Zhejiang and Hubei provinces).
