= Stiftsgymnasium Melk =

Austrian monastic secondary school

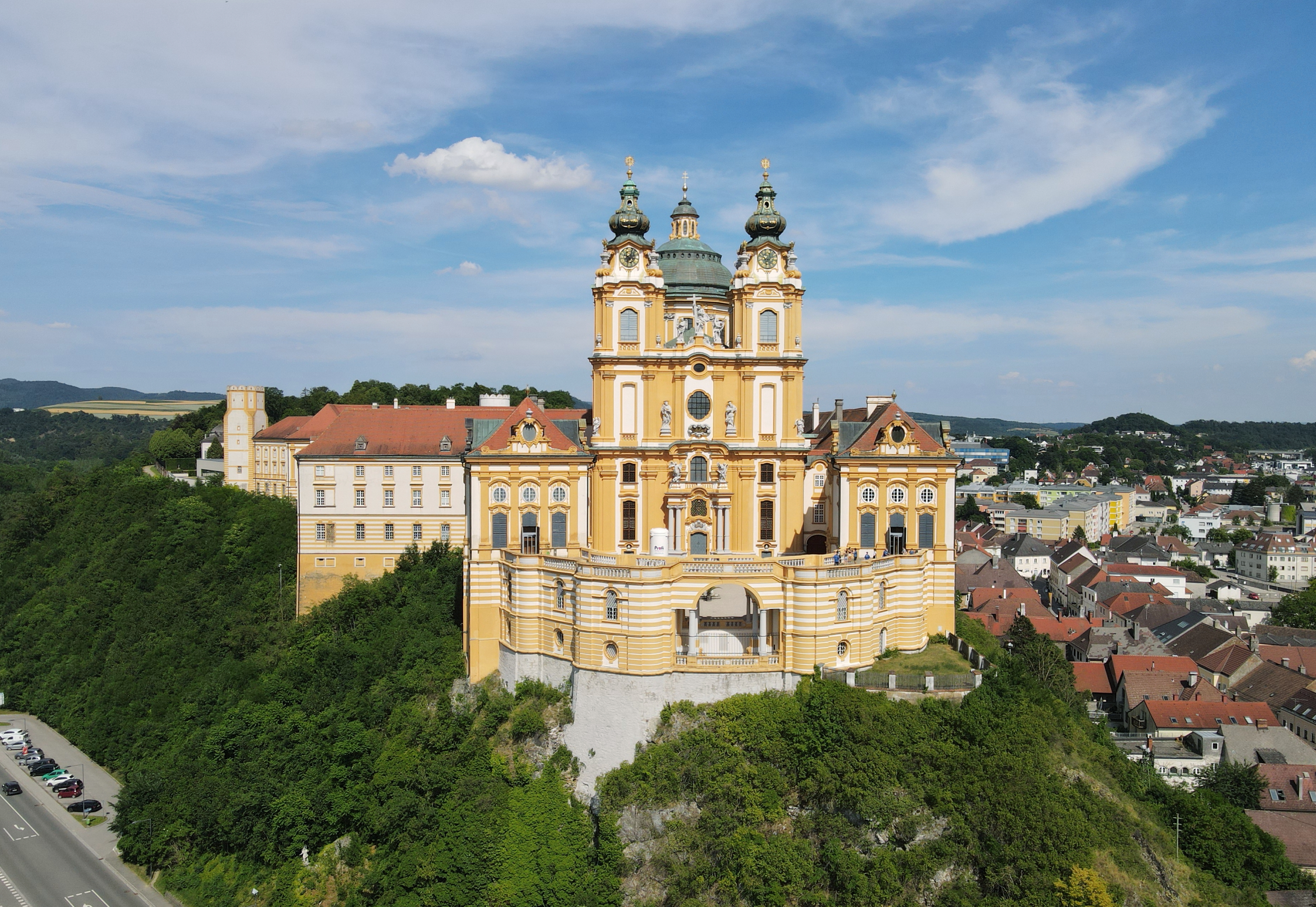

Location
- Melk, Melk District, Lower Austria, 3390; Austria; 48°13′41″N 15°20′02″E

Information
- School type: Gymnasium, Monastic school
- Motto: Discimus vitam (Learning for life)
- Denomination: Roman Catholic
- Patron saint: Coloman of Stockerau
- Established: before 1140
- Status: open
- School code: 315016
- Headmaster: Anton Eder
- Teaching staff: 89 (2011/12)
- Enrollment: 909 (2011/12)
- Classes: 37
- Student to teacher ratio: 10.2
- Language: German
- Website: gymmelk.ac.at

Stiftsgymnasium Melk (German: Melk Abbey's gymnasium) is a Roman Catholic Benedictine-run gymnasium located in Melk, Austria. The gymnasium is located within and run by the well-known monastery Melk Abbey. Founded in the 12th century as a monastic school, it is also one of the oldest continuously operating schools in present-day Austria.

== History ==
=== Medieval monastic school ===
The earliest documents proving the existence of a medieval monastic school at Melk Abbey are a parish register and some parchment scraps dating back to about 1140 and 1160 respectively. It is assumed that it was founded sometime in the first half of the 12th century, but it may already hung over from the monastery's establishment in 1089. In the 15th century, alongside the Melk Reform strongly influencing Austrian and Bavarian Benedictine religious life, the school flourished and gained reputation. So, for instance, in 1446 a monk called Simon wrote an education book for six-year-old King Ladislaus the Posthumous of Hungary. However, starting from around 1530 and mainly caused by the onset of the Protestant Reformation in the Habsburg Empire, the abbey suffered from a dramatic lack of personnel, and so did the school. In 1566, there were only six clergymen.

This crisis went on until the end of the 16th century, when in the wake of the Counter-Reformation more and more students from South German Jesuit Colleges attended the school. Those students, amongst them also poeta laureatus Laurentius Flenheintius, brought along very good education and raised the school's standard again. Therefore, in 1596 it was reshaped along the lines of a Jesuit College. Through this reform only the four lower classes remained in Melk, to finish school students had to do two further sessions in Vienna. In 1707, Abbot Berthold Dietmayr converted the school into a full, contemporary gymnasium.

=== Modern school 1707–1938 ===
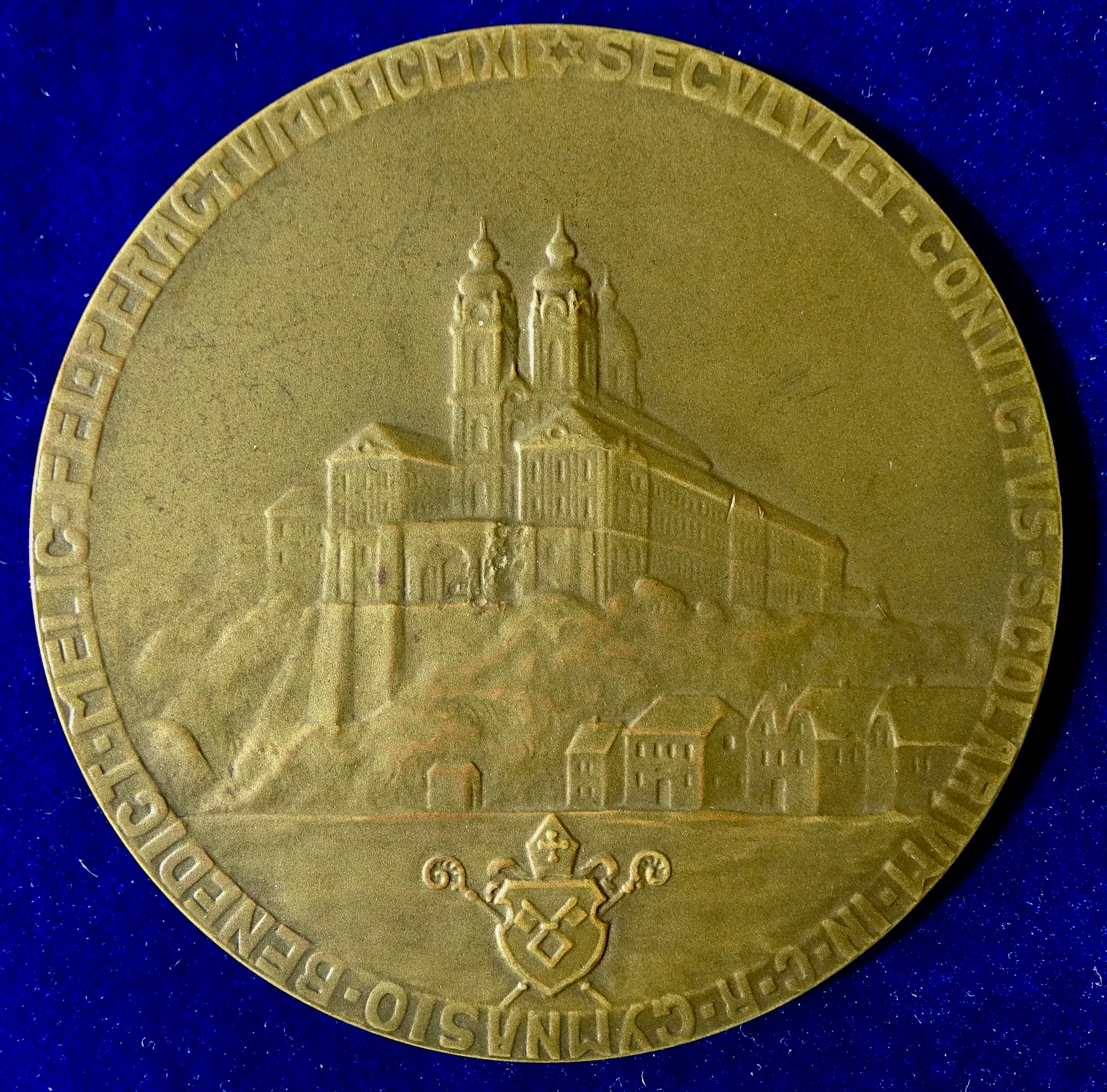
100th Anniversary of Benedictine Stiftsgymnasium Melk's boarding school, Art Nouveau Medal 1911, obverse

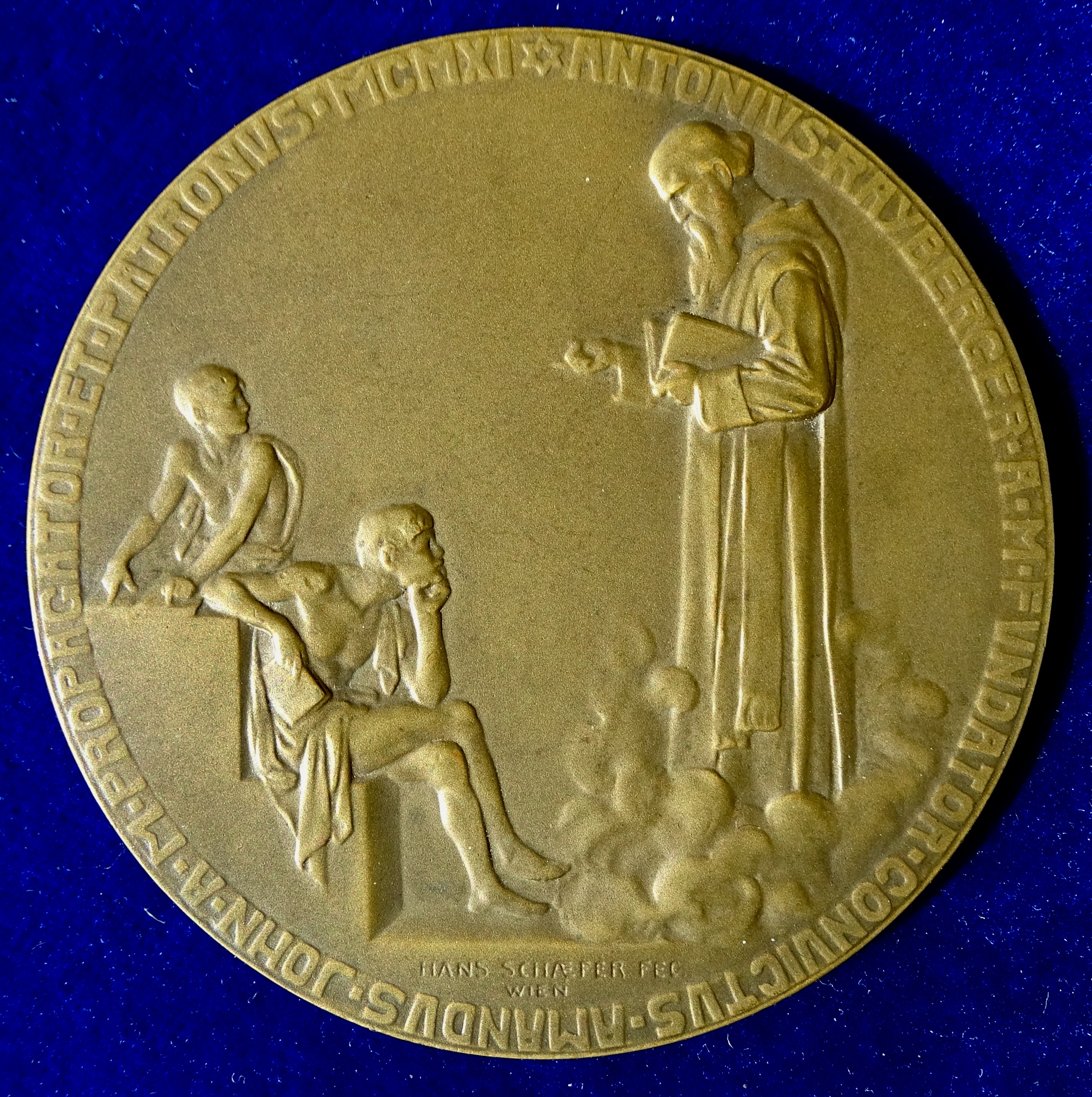
The reverse of this medal by Hans Schaefer shows Saint Benedict of Nursia teaching

Starting from the beginning of the 1781/82 session, the Stiftsgymnasium due to Empress Maria Theresa’s education policies was referred to as gymnasium publicum, a type of school that was "partially open to the public". In 1787, Joseph II relocated it to Sankt Pölten since he had made the city a diocesan town three years before and thus wanted it to have an "appropriate" school, too. The school then did not return to Melk until 1804. In 1811, Abbot Anton Reyberger established the school's boarding home, which was opened November 7. Moreover, a preparatory class (praeparanda) was introduced to facilitate pupils’ transition from their small village schools to gymnasium, it persisted until 1927. In 1850, the number of classes was raised to eight and hence in 1851 the first Matura exams could take place in Melk. At that time, the school's scientific collections were constituted and exceptionally promoted.

According to the school's annual report of 1861 in that year there was a total enrollment of 208, including 51 boarders. As from 1873 there were secular teachers in minors, from 1879/80 those taught chief subjects as well. In 1877/78 the school was structurally extended, so, for instance, a new physics room and a new refectory were built. In 1905, the Episcopal Seminary of Melk was unclosed, where until its closure in 2006 pupils of Stiftsgymnasium were housed. In order to distinguish them from the students who lived in the boarding home situated in the monastery (germ. Konvikt) and hence were called Konviktisten those seminary pupils were known as Seminaristen.

After Austria's incorporation into the German Reich (Anschluss), by March 13, 1938, Principal Fr. Wilhelm Schier was deposed and replaced by the Nazi-affiliated Fr. Coelestin Schoiko. In late 1938 the school was closed down completely and later converted into a National Political Institute of Education (commonly known as Napola).

=== Since 1945 ===
After some reconstruction and clearing work was done it was possible to restore school life as early as by September 1945. In 1966, an annual student exchange program to Saint John's Preparatory School in Collegeville, Minnesota (also operated by a Benedictine abbey, Saint John's) was established, and is currently still operating. With appreciably declining enrollment numbers, Stiftsgymnasium was declared co-educational (admitting girls as well) by the session of 1967/68, and a modern-language branch ("neusprachlicher Zweig", focusing on French), as opposed to the "classical" branch ("humanistischer" or "altsprachlicher Zweig", focused on the teaching of Latin and Ancient Greek), was adopted. In 1972, Abbot Reginald Zupancic appointed Ernst Wegscheider principal; thereby, the office was held by a layman for the very first time. Since 1973 all teachers at Stiftsgymnasium are publicly funded, posing a markedly financial relief for the school.

== Notable alumni ==
The Stiftsgymnasium's alumni as well as other former students are called Altmelkers. There is an alumni association named Verein der Altmelker und Freunde (Association of old Melkers and Friends), which furthermore awards scholarships to current students.

- Gregor Werner (1693–1766), composer
- Johann Georg Albrechtsberger (1736–1809), musician
- Friedrich Halm (1806–1871), dramatist and poet
- August Sicard von Sicardsburg (1813–1868), architect
- Karl Werner (1821–1888), theologian
- Carl Zeller (1842–1898), composer
- Karl Kautsky (1854–1938), political theoretician and philosopher
- Spiridon Gopčević (1855–1928), astronomer and historian
- Adolf Loos (1870–1933), architect
- Franz Blei (1871–1942), writer and critic
- Leopold Blauensteiner (1880–1947), painter
- Albert Paris Gütersloh (1887–1973), painter
- Leopold Vietoris (1891–2002), mathematician and supercentenarian
- Franz König (1905–2004), Roman Catholic Cardinal and Archbishop of Vienna
- Wilhelm Beiglböck, (1905–1963), internist, WWII war criminal
- Georg, Duke of Hohenberg (1929-2019), heir presumptive to the Austrian throne and diplomat
- Josef Hader (born 1962), comedian and actor
- Otto Lechner (born 1964), musician
- Hermine Haselböck, mezzo-soprano

=== Notable teachers ===
- Bernhard Pez (1683–1735), historian and librarian
- Gabriel Strobl (1846–1925), entomologist

== See also ==
- List of the oldest schools in the world
