= Göta Ljungberg =

Swedish soprano (1893–1955)

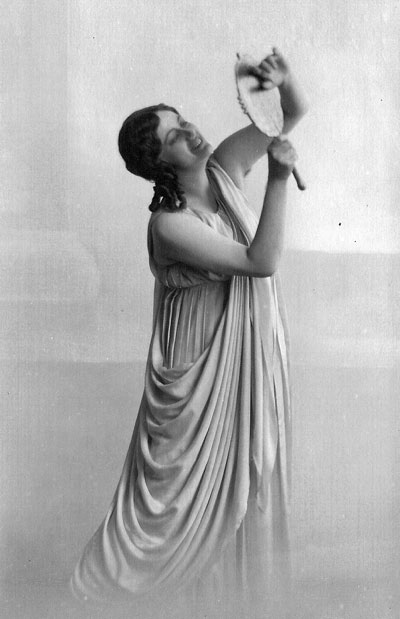
- Göta Ljungberg
- Born: Göta Ljungberg; 4 October 1893; Sundsvall, Sweden
- Died: 28 June 1955 (aged 61)

Göta Ljungberg (4 October 1893 – 28 June 1955) was a major Swedish Wagnerian dramatic soprano of the 1920s who sang throughout American and Europe and left an important recorded legacy.

== Biography ==
Born in Sundsvall, she studied at the Stockholm Opera School with the physician and vocal coach Gillis Bratt. She undertook further studies with Mme Charles Cahier in Stockholm and also in Milan and Berlin. She also studied with Estelle Liebling, the teacher of Beverly Sills, in New York City during her time at the Met.

She debuted as Gutrune in Wagner's Götterdämmerung with the Royal Swedish Opera in 1917. She remained one of the leading singers there until 1926 when began her international career.

She went on to sing at most of the principal opera houses in Europe and America and "was acclaimed not only for her singing, but also for her acting and dramatic intensity"

At the Berlin State Opera, she often appeared in Wagner but also as Tosca, Santuzza (Cavalleria rusticana) and Elektra, as well as in musicals.

Her Royal Opera House London debut was in 1924 as Sieglinde (Der Ring des Nibelungen) under Bruno Walter. She later appeared there as Salome, Kundry (Parsifal), Tosca and Elisabeth (Tannhäuser).

She sang at the Metropolitan Opera from 1932 to 1935 as Isolde (Tristan und Isolde) and Brünnhilde as well as Salome.

Voice problems eventually caused retirement but as late as 1938 she gave a set of songs with orchestra in concert in Copenhagen

== Recorded legacy with critiques ==
1924: Richard Strauss: Salome, cond. Coates. She has a "large range of vocal colour... this long lament, so beautifully sung here by Mme. Ljungberg."

late 1920s: Richard Wagner: Ring excerpts, conducted by Albert Coates and Leo Blech. "The sexy, passionate Ljungberg"

1926: Wagner: Die Walküre. "The best of the vocal records [of that month] appears to be that of the Love Duet.. sung by Gota Ljungberg and Walter Widdop, at whose hands the amorous frenzy of the climax is given full value"

1929: Richard Strauss: Salome (Finale). Cond. Blech. "The performance is all that we should expect from such performers"

1931: Wagner: Tristan und Isolde act III, with Walter Widdop, cond. Blech: One critic claimed that "[her] voice is a fine one but [she] sings here not quite so well as in some of her other recorded roles". Hermann Klein for the Gramophone is more enthusiastic: "neither in the important matter of style nor for beauty of voice or purity and breadth of declamation could [her colleagues in the recording] be compared with an IsoIde like Göta Ljungberg"

1933: Giacomo Puccini: Tosca arias with Joseph Schmidt. "Neither singer seems to have reached an adequate understanding of the dramatic significance of the duet"
