= Klaus König =

German tenor (1934–2025)

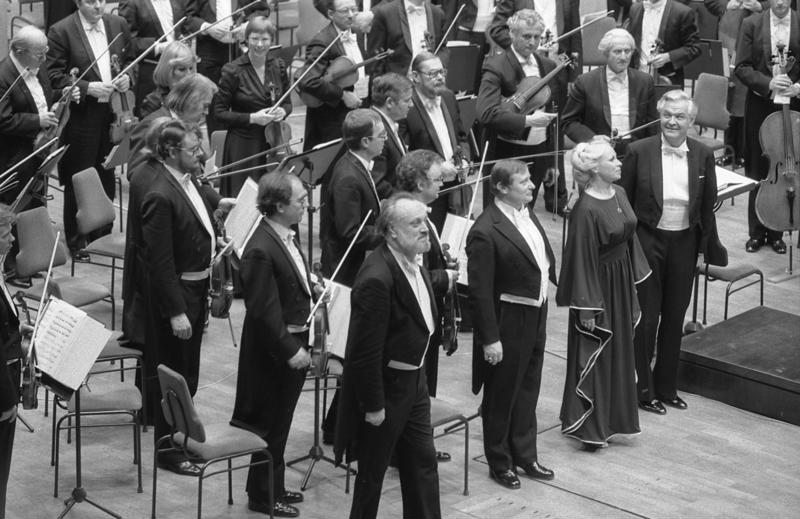
- König (third from right) in 1983
- Born: 26 May 1934; Beuthen, Germany
- Died: 7 June 2025 (aged 91)
- Education: Musikhochschule Dresden
- Occupation: Operatic tenor
- Organizations: Staatsoper Dresden
- Title: Kammersänger

Klaus König (26 May 1934 – 7 June 2025) was a German operatic tenor focused on heldentenor roles including Wagner's Tannhäuser, Lohengrin and Parsifal. Based at the Staatsoper Dresden, he made an international career, performing as Tannhäuser at the Royal Opera House in London and La Scala in Milan in 1984. He performed the tenor solo in Beethoven's Ninth Symphony, conducted by Leonard Bernstein at the Konzerthaus Berlin after the Fall of the Berlin Wall. At the time of his death in 2025, Place de l'Opera magazine described him as "one of the most important tenors of his generation, especially in the heroic tenor repertoire."

== Life and career ==
König was born in Beuthen, Upper Silesia, on 26 May 1934. He grew up in Bad Muskau. He trained as a house painter and decorator and worked in his father's business. He later opened his own workshop in Krauschwitz. He studied voice at the Musikhochschule Dresden from 1965, taking evening courses. He kept running the workshop even after becoming known internationally as a singer.

König made his stage debut at the Theater Cottbus in 1970 in the role of Riccardo in Wolf-Ferrari's Die vier Grobiane. He became a member of the ensemble of the Landestheater Dessau in 1973, performing roles of the genre jugendlicher Heldentenor, such as Max in Weber's Der Freischütz and Erik in Wagner's Der fliegende Holländer. He was a member of the Leipzig Opera from 1978 to 1982, performing roles such as the title hero Tristan in Wagner's Tristan und Isolde in 1980, which earned him international recognition.

König became a member of the Staatsoper Dresden in 1982. When the restored Semperoper was opened in 1985 with a performance of Der Freischütz, he appeared as Max, and performed the role of the Sänger in Der Rosenkavalier by R. Strauss the following day. Performances of the opening season were recorded for television and later issued as CDs and DVDs. He portrayed there the title heroes of Wagner's Tannhäuser, Lohengrin and Parsifal, as well as Erik and Stolzing in Die Meistersinger von Nürnberg. He appeared as Florestan in Beethoven's Fidelio and as Bacchus in Ariadne auf Naxos by R. Strauss. In 1998, he appeared as the Mayor in Friedenstag by R. Strauss.

König was a regular guest at the Vienna State Opera from 1985 to 1992, performing as Bacchus, Erik, Stolzing, Tannhäuser and Lohengrin. He performed at the Royal Opera House in London first in 1984 as Tannhäuser and in 1987 as Bacchus, at La Scala in Milan first in 1984 again as Tannhäuser, at La Monnaie in Brussels first in 1985 as Tristan, at the Teatro Nacional de São Carlos in Lisbon in 1986 as Florestan), at the Cologne Opera in 1987 as Tannhäuser, and at the Teatro Colón in Buenos Aires in 1988 as Florestan. König performed at the Bavarian State Opera in Munich the title role of Guntram by R. Strauss. He appeared as Tannhäuser also at the Paris Opera.

König first performed in the United States in 1988 in Houston as Tannhäuser. He appeared as Bacchus at the Seattle Opera. He made his debut at the Metropolitan Opera in New York City on 30 March 1994 as Erik, alongside James Morris in the title role and Hildegard Behrens as Senta. He performed as Siegmund in Wagner's Die Walküre at the Dutch National Opera in Amsterdam in 1991, as Bacchus at the Hamburg State Opera in 1992 and as Tannhäuser at the Teatro Massimo Bellini in Catania in 1994.

König was active in concert, singing especially works by Beethoven, Anton Bruckner and Gustav Mahler. He performed the tenor part in Beethoven's Ninth Symphony at the Konzerthaus Berlin conducted by Leonard Bernstein after the Fall of the Berlin Wall in 1989. He appeared regularly at the Schlesisches Musikfest festival in Görlitz, for example Bruckner's Te Deum in 1996 and the tenor part in Beethoven's Ninth Symphony in 1998.

König gradually ended his operatic career from 2000; one of his last roles was Aegisth in Elektra by R. Strauss. He appeared once more in 2002 at the Staatstheater Cottbus, together with Theo Adam and other artists of the Semperoper, in a charity concert for victims of the 2002 floods.

He was honoured with the title Kammersänger by the Staatsoper Dresden in 1984 and with the Nationalpreis der DDR in art and literature in 1985.

König died on 7 June 2025, at the age of 91.

== Recordings ==
König recorded Mahler's Das Lied von der Erde in 1982, alongside Agnes Baltsa with the London Philharmonic Orchestra conducted by Klaus Tennstedt; a reviewer described him as "heroic if slightly throaty of tone but with plenty of heft and ringing top notes". He recorded Tannhäuser with the Bavarian Radio Symphony Orchestra and choir conducted by Bernard Haitink in 1985, alongside Waltraud Meier as Venus, Lucia Popp as Elisabeth, Bernd Weikl as Wolfram and Kurt Moll as Hermann; Alan Blyth noted that he sang with "a truly Wagnerian timbre and authority" and "suitable force and anguish" for the character's "vein of inner torture".
