= Victoria Coeln =

Austrian artist

Victoria Coeln in 2026

Victoria Coeln (born 20 December 1962, Vienna, Austria) is an Austrian artist who lives and works in Vienna. Her work centers around how light, space and colour are perceived.

== Biography ==
Coeln studied Stage Design at the Academy of Fine Arts Vienna as well as Mathematics at the University of Vienna and the Vienna University of Technology between 1981 and 1985. After graduating, she assisted the set-designer Günther Schneider-Siemssen between 1986–1989 and built sets commissioned by European operas, advertisements and music videos. Within this field of work she began to realize her fascination with light and began to specialize.

== Work ==
Victoria Coeln is best known for her large-scale, immersive, light installations that have been showcased on some of Vienna's most celebrated buildings. However, she doesn't only work three-dimensionally and has also created a two-dimensional image space series.

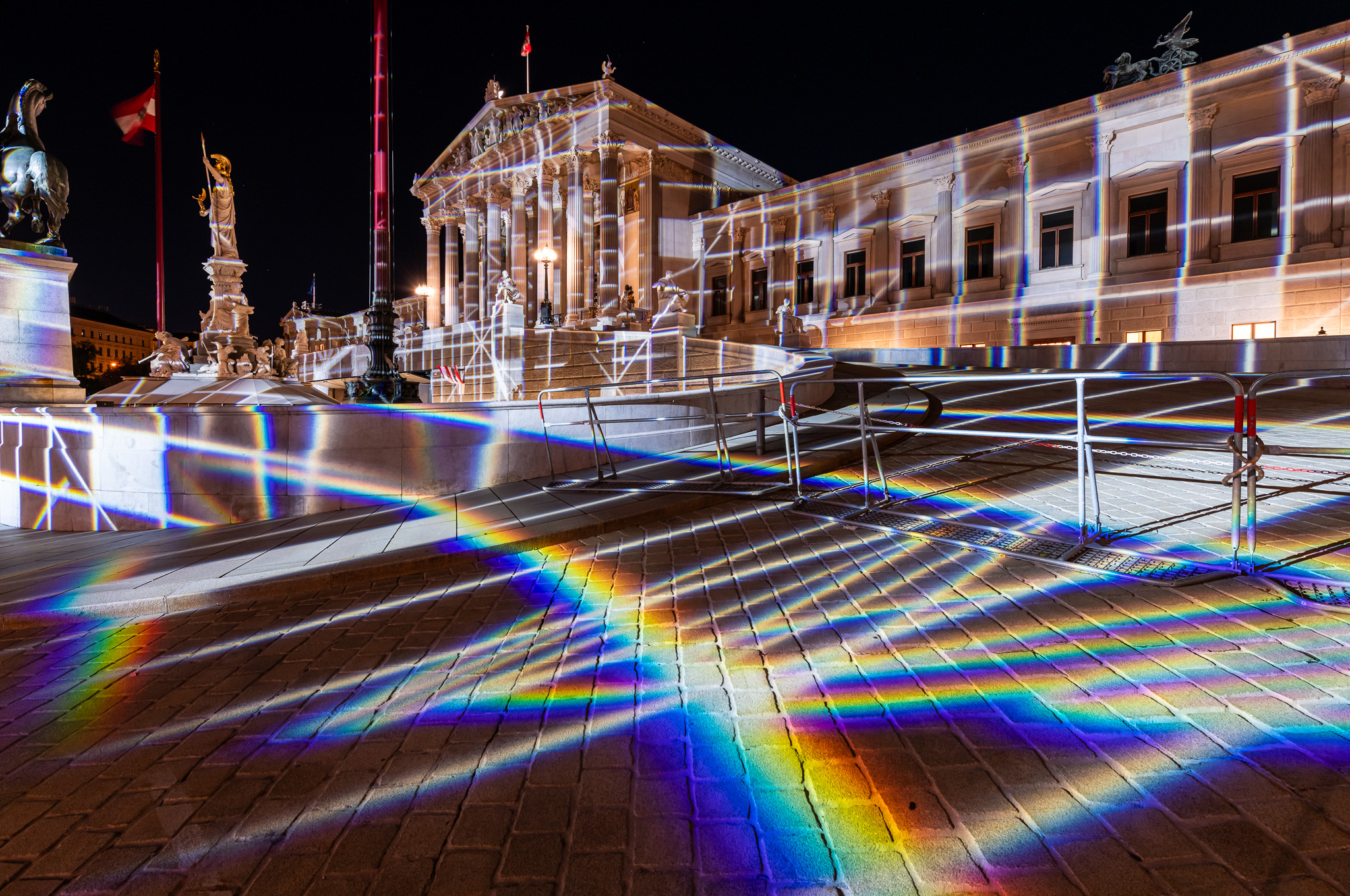
The Parliament in the Light of Human Rights

Her etching into dichroic glass slides is reminiscent of the preparation of printing plates in traditional engraving techniques, however, she uses the glass plates as filters through which to project light.

She builds polychrome light spaces that she calls "Chromotopes" that are developed on-site and installed temporarily or permanently in public outdoor and interior spaces. Coeln's natural chromotopes are built on the basis of sunlight illuminating her filters, while the artificial require projectors.

All her more recent work focuses around the manifestation of these Chromotopes within differing spaces. They are used as the setting for her portrait series, choreography and performances and are often accompanied by correlative music, creating public spaces that encourage social interaction.

== Works (Selection) ==
- "Wiener Lichtblicke", Annual festival of art and political culture in public space, Vienna and surroundings, since 2020.
- "Lichtblicke Österreichs - Chromotopia Austria", Light art installation at Heldenplatz and Neue Burg of the Hofburg, Vienna, 2025.
- "LichtStrauss", Light and media art installation as part of Johann Strauss 2025 Wien, Stadtpark Vienna, March to May 2025.
- "Engel.Licht.Orgel", light installation, collaboration with Carinthian Summer, Klagenfurt Cathedral, Klagenfurt, July to August 2024.
- "Chromotopia Laakirchen", solo exhibition, Papiermachermuseum, European Capital of Culture 2024, Bad-Ischl-Salzkammergut, 2024.
- "Chromotopic Cycle", group exhibition, LUCE 2024, Ars Carinthia - Kunst & Handwerk, Carinthia, 2024.
- "The Parliament in the Light of Human Rights", Light art installation, The Austrian Parliament, Vienna, November 2023 to January 2024.
- "Soma Kardía", Group exhibition, light intervention / Kultursommer 2023, Herz Jesu Kirche, Bregenz, 2023.
- "Chromotopia", Collaboration with Deborah Sengl, group exhibition / LichteWege, Weinbergterrassen, Kassel, 2022.
- "Café Chromatique", temporary light interventions and exhibition, Viennese Coffeehouses and Art display window Nespresso Atelier, Vienna, May to November 2021.
- "Victoria Coeln • Chromotopia", Studio-in-residence and solo exhibition / Museum der Bildenden Künste, Leipzig, 2019.
- "Peaceful Revolution", Lichtstudio, Lichträume, Lichtring / Participatory city project on 1989, 30 Years of the Peaceful Revolution, Urban space Leipzig, 2019.
- "Katharinen Passion", artistic light intervention, Katharinenkirche Frankfurt am Main, Germany, March 2018.
- "Crossing Realities Cyprus", temporary light installation, Larnaka and Idaliou, Cyprus, 2017.
- "Verhüllungen • Lebenszeit Herkunft Geschlecht • Trilogie", Artistic long-term intervention, St. Stephen’s Cathedral, Vienna, 2017.
- "Painting the Night", 10 artistic light interventions / KunstFestSpiele Herrenhausen & Produktion.made in Germany drei, Großer Garten of Herrenhausen, Hannover, 2017.
- "Dystopia Eutopia", artistic light interventions, Heldentor and Michaelertor, Hofburg Vienna, May to June 2016.
- "Chromogramme", Group exhibition / LICHT LIGHT, Fotogalerie Wien, Vienna, 2016.
- "Chromotopia Santa Maria", Artistic light intervention / Catedral de Burgos, Spain, 2016.
- "Crossing Realities Türkyie", Solo exhibition / Austrian Cultural Forum Istanbul, Istanbul, 2015.
- "Chromotopia Heldentor", temporary light installation, Vienna, May to September 2014.
- "Chromotopia Kokoschka", temporary light installation on the Leopold Museum, Vienna, 2013.
- "Chromotopia St. Stephan", temporary light installation, Stephansplatz, Vienna, May 2011 to December 2014.
- "Expand [2141.2417.2741]", Collaboration with Susanne Lyner, group exhibition / expanded painting, Künstlerhaus and Projektraum M54, Vienna AT, Basel, 2011/12.
- "Chromolab I + II", Group exhibition / Salon XV, Month of Photography, Galerie Foto K, Vienna, 2010.
- "Sonnenchromotop", Sunlight-based permanent intervention / Art-in-architecture project, Molzbichl, Spittal/Drau, 2010.
- "Chromotopia Stadtpark I – Painting the Night", permanent installation at the entrance of the Stadtpark/Reisnerstrasse, Vienna, since 2008.
- "Chromotopia Konzerthaus", permanent light installation on the facade of Vienna's Konzerthaus, Vienna, since 2007.
- "Chromotop ZKM", Group exhibition / Lichtkunst aus Kunstlicht, ZKM, Karlsruhe, 2005.
- "Farbraumbilder", Solo exhibition / Galerie Krohn, Badenweiler, 2004.
- "Farbraum Bogen 48", Artistic light intervention / Kubus VALIE EXPORT, Vienna, 2002.
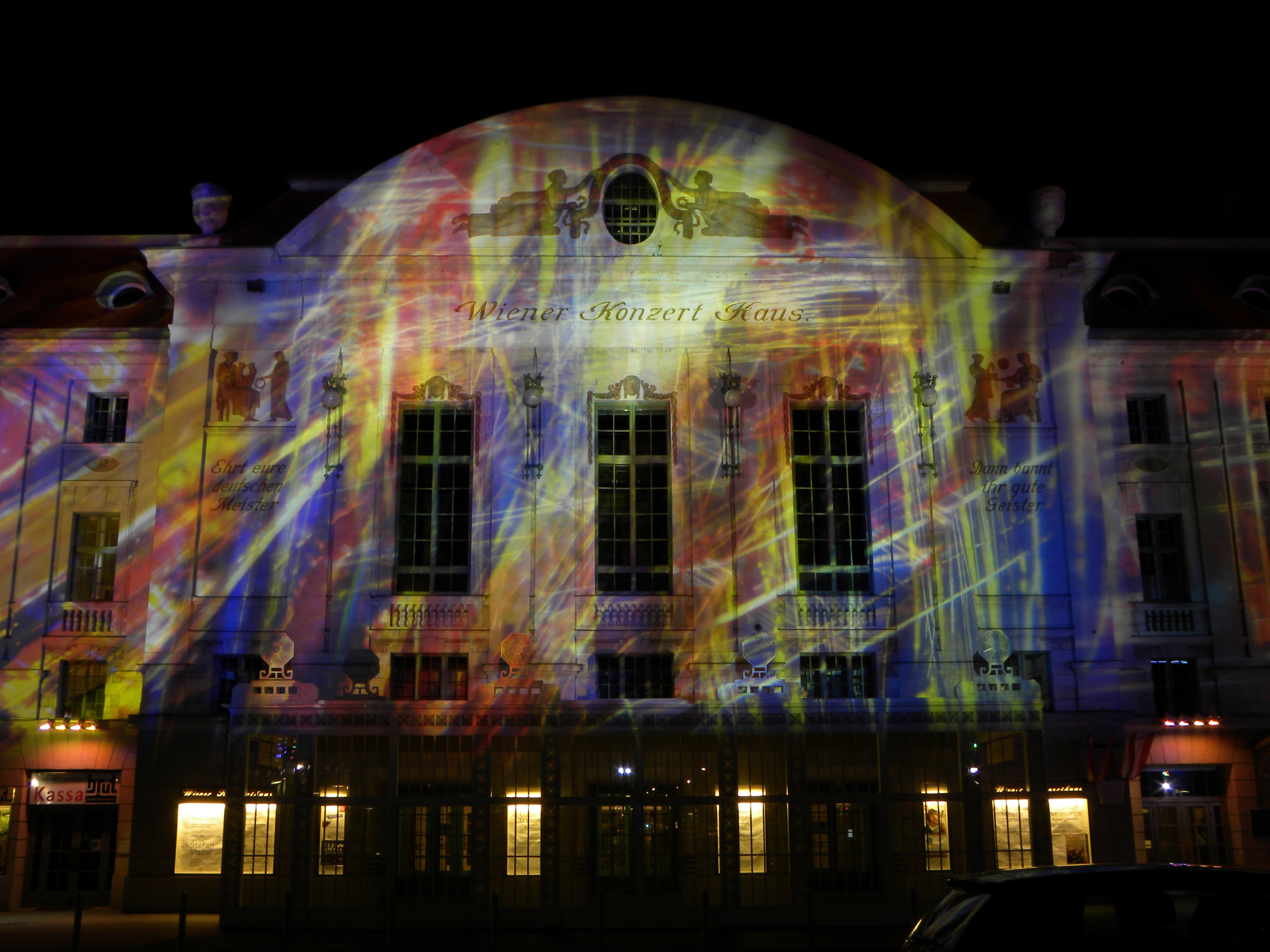
"Chromotopia Konzerthaus", Vienna

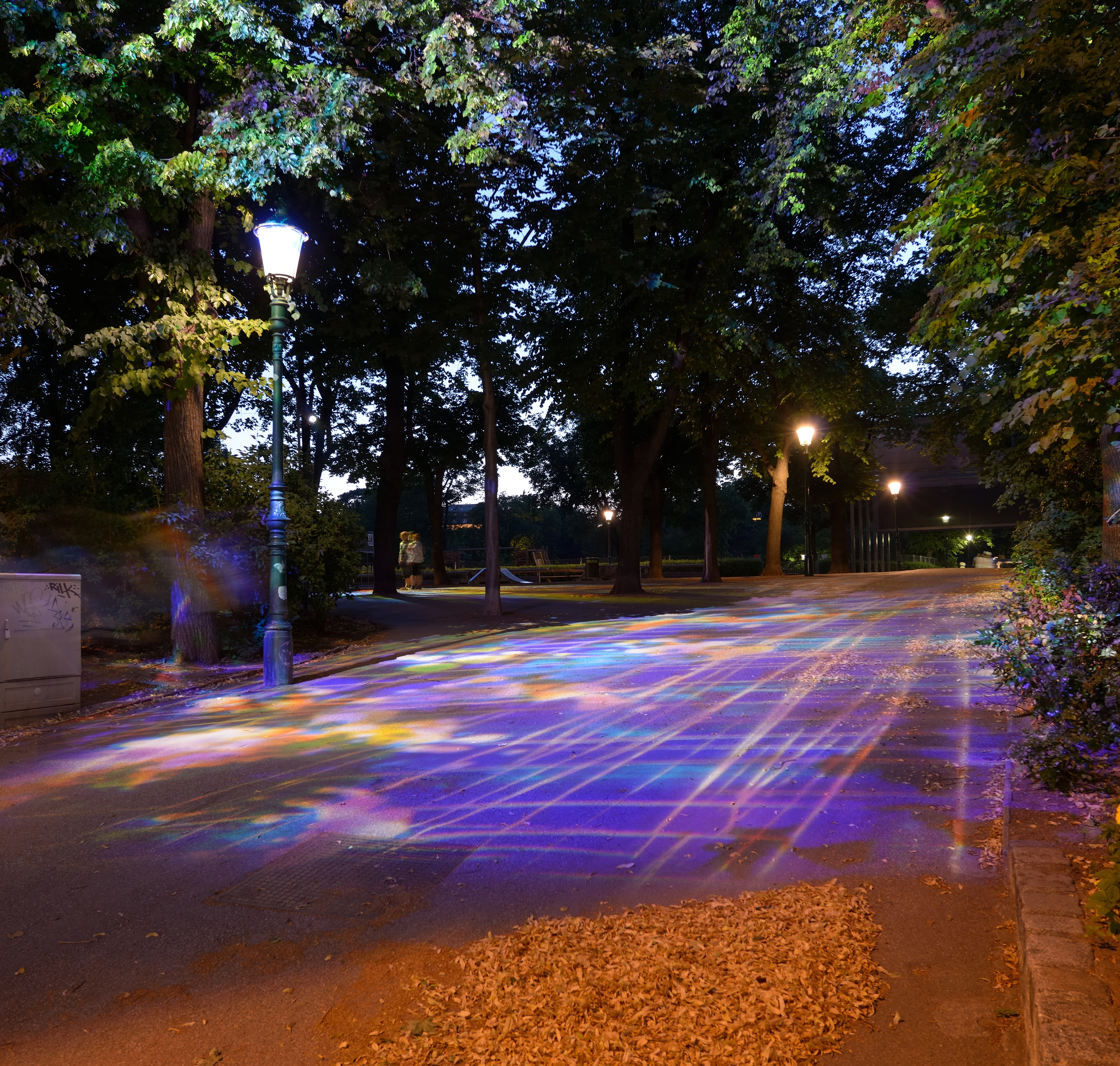
"Chromotopia Stadtpark", Vienna

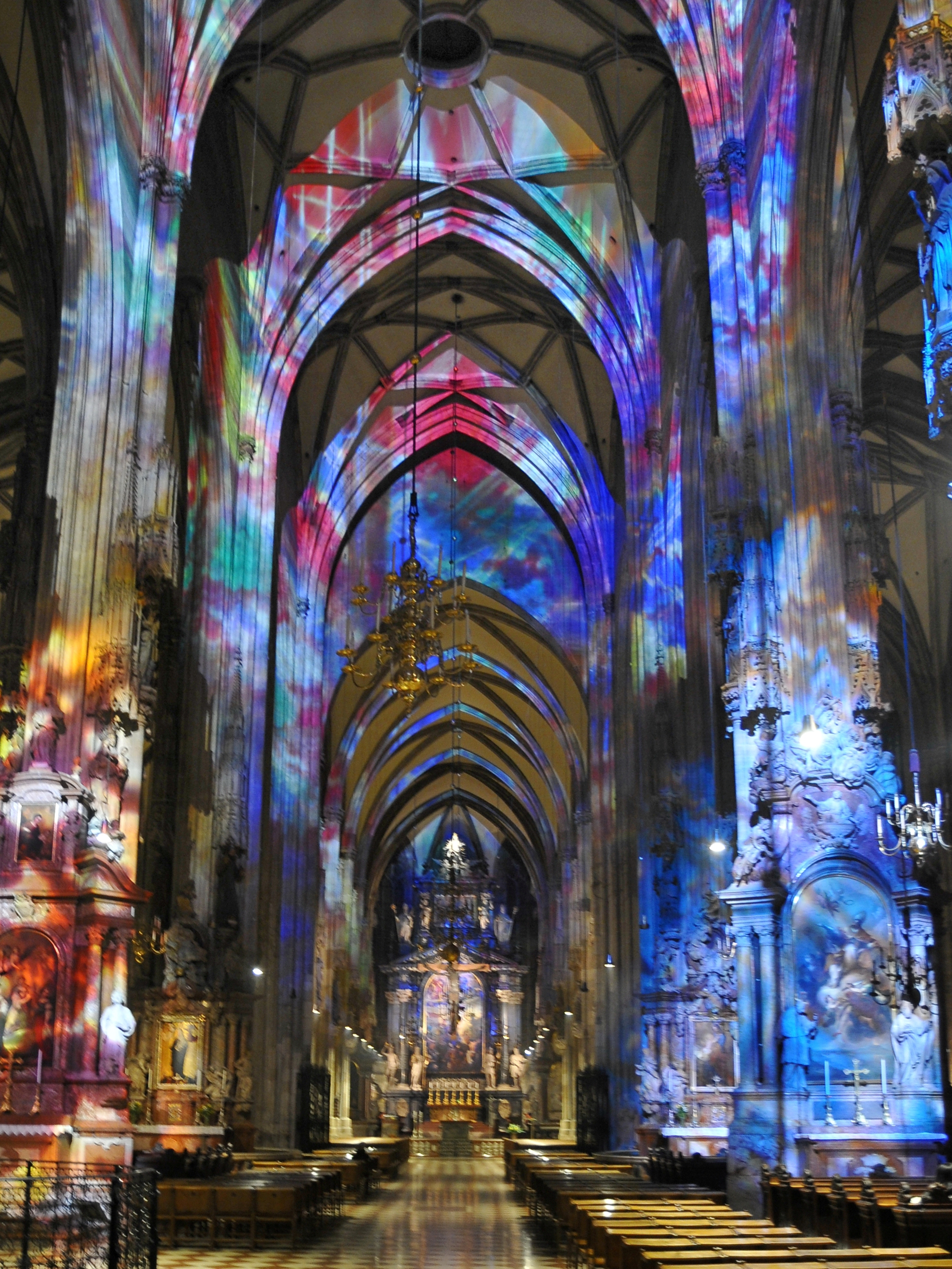
"Chromotopia St. Stephan", Vienna

== Bibliography ==
Peter Roehlen: "FARB LICHT SPIEL: Dichroic Glass in Fine Arts and Archictecture“, Prinz Optics, Berlin, 2013, p. 14–19.
Doris Lippitsch: "Lichträume in Wien: Lichter der Grossstadt“, Bohmann, Wien, 2009, ISBN 978-3-9019-8387-0, p. 32–47. (in German)
Peter Weibel & Gregor Jansen: "Lichtkunst aus Kunstlicht – Licht als Medium der Kunst im 20. und 21. Jahrhundert / Light Art from Artificial Light – Light as a Medium in 20th ad 21st Century Art“ (Ausstellungskatalog ZKM), Hatje Cantz Publishers, Ostfildern, 2006, ISBN 978-3-7757-1774-8, p. 373. (in German)
