= Leopold Blauensteiner =

Austrian painter (1880–1947)

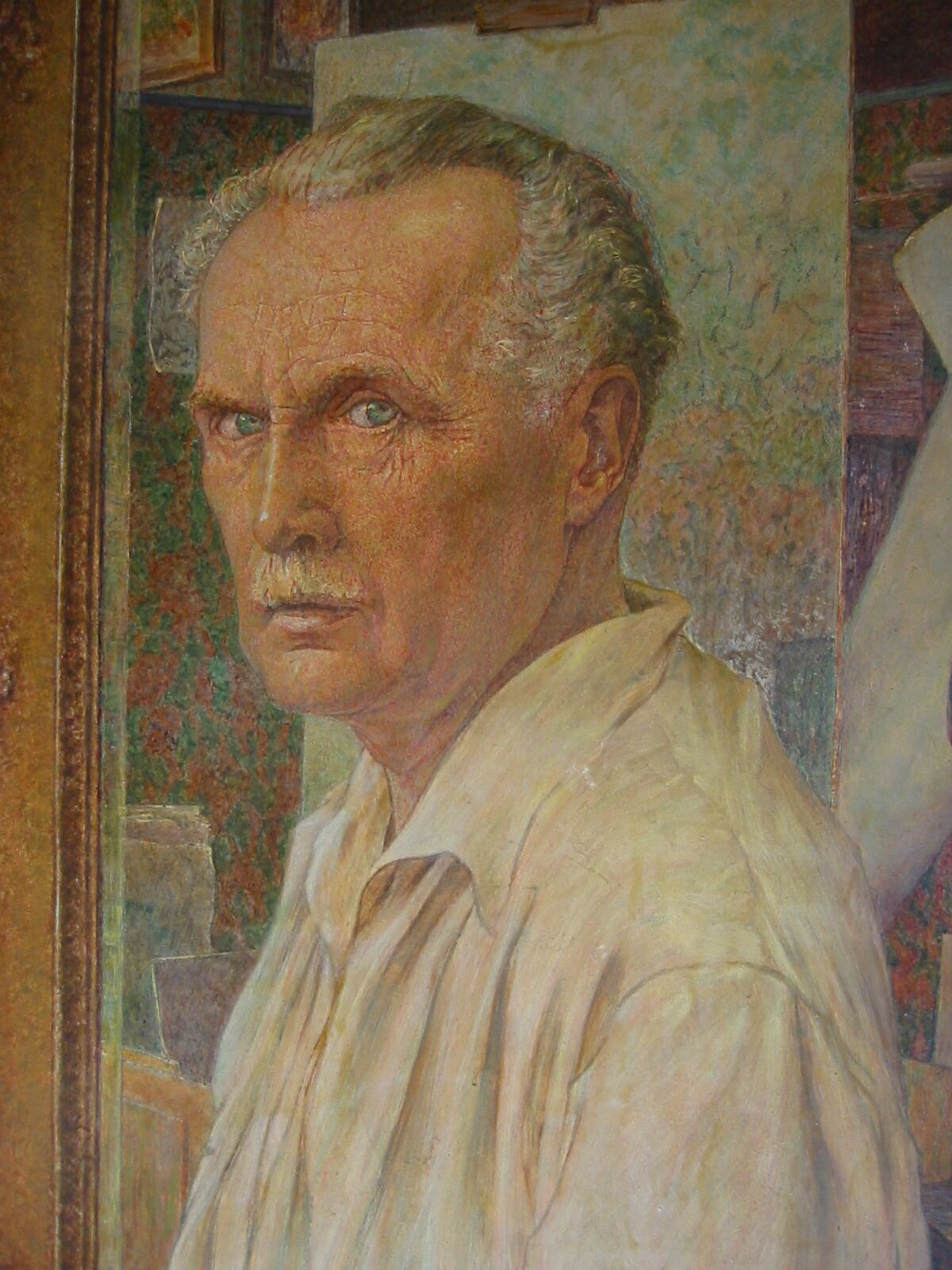
Self-portrait

Leopold Blauensteiner (16 January 1880 – 19 February 1947) was an Austrian academic painter.

== Biography ==
Blauensteiner was the son of Leopold Blauensteiner and Johanna Toscano del Banner. His father died shortly after his birth, and his mother died in 1887, leaving him an orphan. He attended the grammar school in Melk. As a schoolboy he worked on the restoration of the parish church of Melk.

After leaving school, he spent a year as a volunteer in the army. He then began to study painting at the Academy of Fine Arts in Vienna under Professor Christian Griepenkerl and also studied a few terms of art history. In addition he took private lessons from Alfred Roller, who ran the magazine of the newly formed Vienna Secession, Ver Sacrum, which in 1903 and 1904 printed some coloured woodcuts by Blauensteiner. This was the first public appearance of his work.

In 1904 he married Friderika Berger, who bore him three sons. In 1908, he took an active part in the worked actively in the Kunstschau Wien 1908. In 1909 he became a committee member of the "Klimt-Gruppe", and in 1911 of the Bund Hagen.

In the First World War he joined the Uhlans (Lancers), leaving in 1916 with the rank of First Lieutenant.

In 1924 he was a member of the artists' group "Die Hand", which exhibited in the Zedlitzhalle. He bought a house in Melk, where from 1925 he worked as conservator for the Monuments Office for the District of Melk and painted in his studio. From 1920 he was a member of the Vienna Künstlerhaus. In 1927 he was awarded the Austrian State Prize. In 1929 for his painting Funeralien ("Funeral Rites at Melk Abbey") he won a scholarship for a year's study in Italy, where he stayed until 1930. In 1932 he was awarded received the State Prize medal and the title of Professor.

In 1933 he joined the National Socialist Party, but left again after it was banned in Austria, and in 1934 joined the Popular Front.

In 1937 he became president of the Association of Vienna Artists (Genossenschaft bildender Künstler Wiens) and also of the Permanent Delegation of Austrian Artists (Ständige Delegation bildender Künstler Österreichs). In 1938 he was elected president of the Vienna Künstlerhaus, which he headed until 1941.

In 1939, he reactivated his membership in the Nazi Party and was appointed National Director of the Reich Chamber of Fine Arts (Reichskammer der bildenden Künste) in Vienna. He was soon dismissed from this position, but later reinstated as honorary director. He was able in 1944 to stop the installation of a production unit of the Heinkel Aircraft Works in the Künstlerhaus. He also prevented the destruction of works of "degenerate art" (entartete Kunst) by Carry Hauser, Oskar Kokoschka, Egon Schiele and others, which he caused to be stored in the mine workings at Altaussee.

In 1945 he was arrested on the basis of an accusation by the Russian forces of occupation and was taken before the Vienna Regional Court. After a court hearing in which he was acquitted of National Socialist activities, he was released. He was refused compensation for his detention however as there were "grounds for reasonable suspicion". He died of heart failure in 1947 aged 67.

== Works ==
His main works include: Funeralien im Stift Melk ("Funeral Rites at Melk Abbey"), Der tote Sohn ("The Dead Son"), Die Strecke ("The Track"), Symphonie in Blau ("Symphony in Blue"), family pictures and landscapes. Even before World War II half of his oeuvre had been sold. Study trips to Italy, Dalmatia, Lorraine and Germany produced many landscapes. He had exhibitions in Prague, Dresden, Berlin and other cities. Although he worked primarily as a painter, there also exist design for furniture, ornamental gratings, lanterns and similar things. He designed the meeting room of the "Schlaraffia" in Melk. Under the direction of Gustav Mahler he designed the fittings of the Vienna State Opera.

His paintings are mainly privately owned. The former Pollak Gallery in Bern bought many of his pictures. Specimens of his work are to be found in the Österreichische Galerie Belvedere, the Albertina, the Museum of the University of Applied Arts Vienna, Vienna City Hall, the Leopold Museum in Vienna, the Rupertinum in Salzburg, the Lower Austrian Provincial Museum in Sankt Pölten and the Musée d'Orsay in Paris.
