= Kaim-Saal =

Coordinates: 48°08′42″N 11°34′20″E

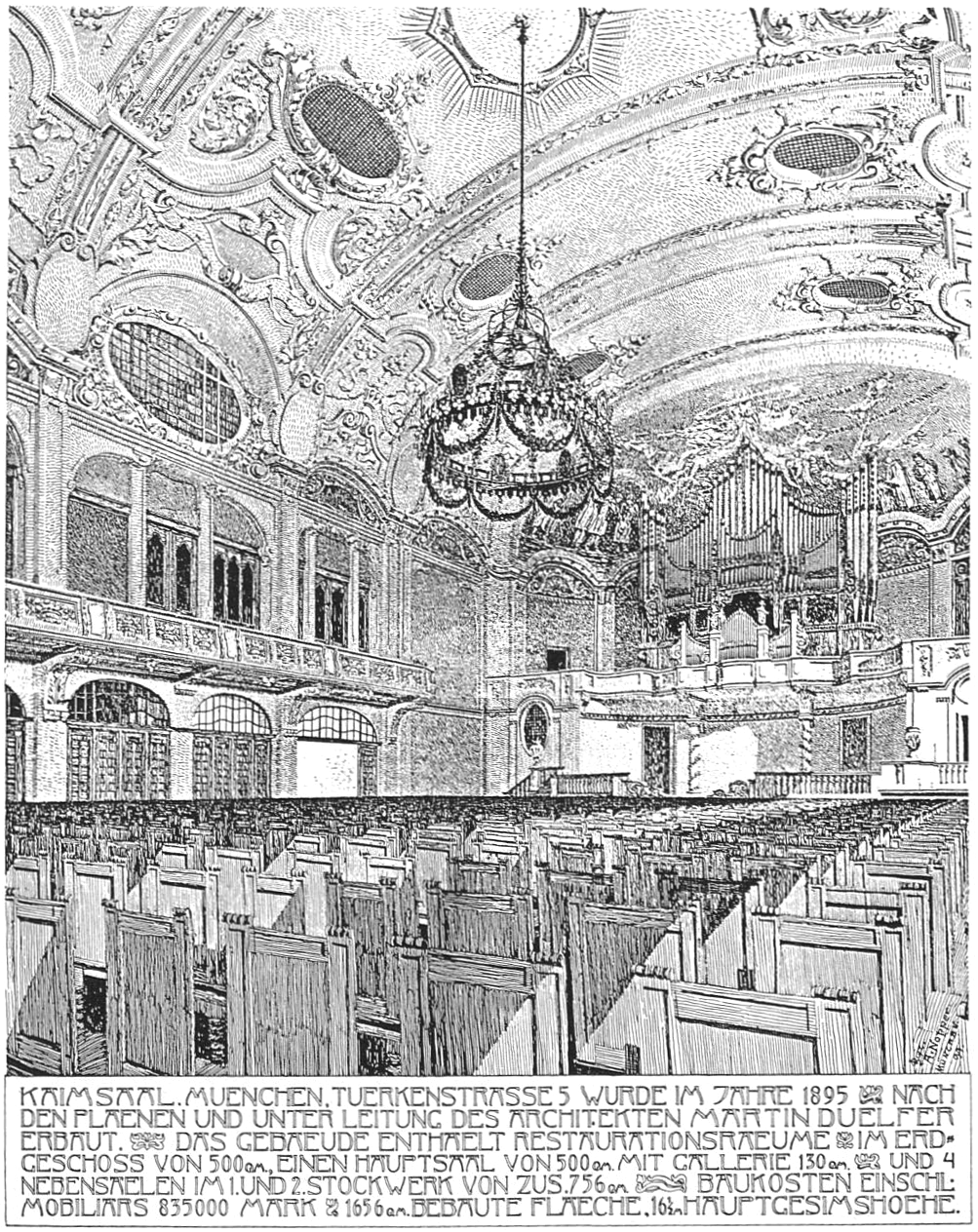
Large Hall, 1895 drawing

Kaim-Saal was a concert hall in Maxvorstadt, Munich, Germany. Built in 1895, it was renamed Tonhalle in 1905. It was destroyed in 1944 in the Bombing of Munich in World War II.
