= Kindertotenlieder =

1904 song cycle by Gustav Mahler

- Song cycle by Gustav Mahler
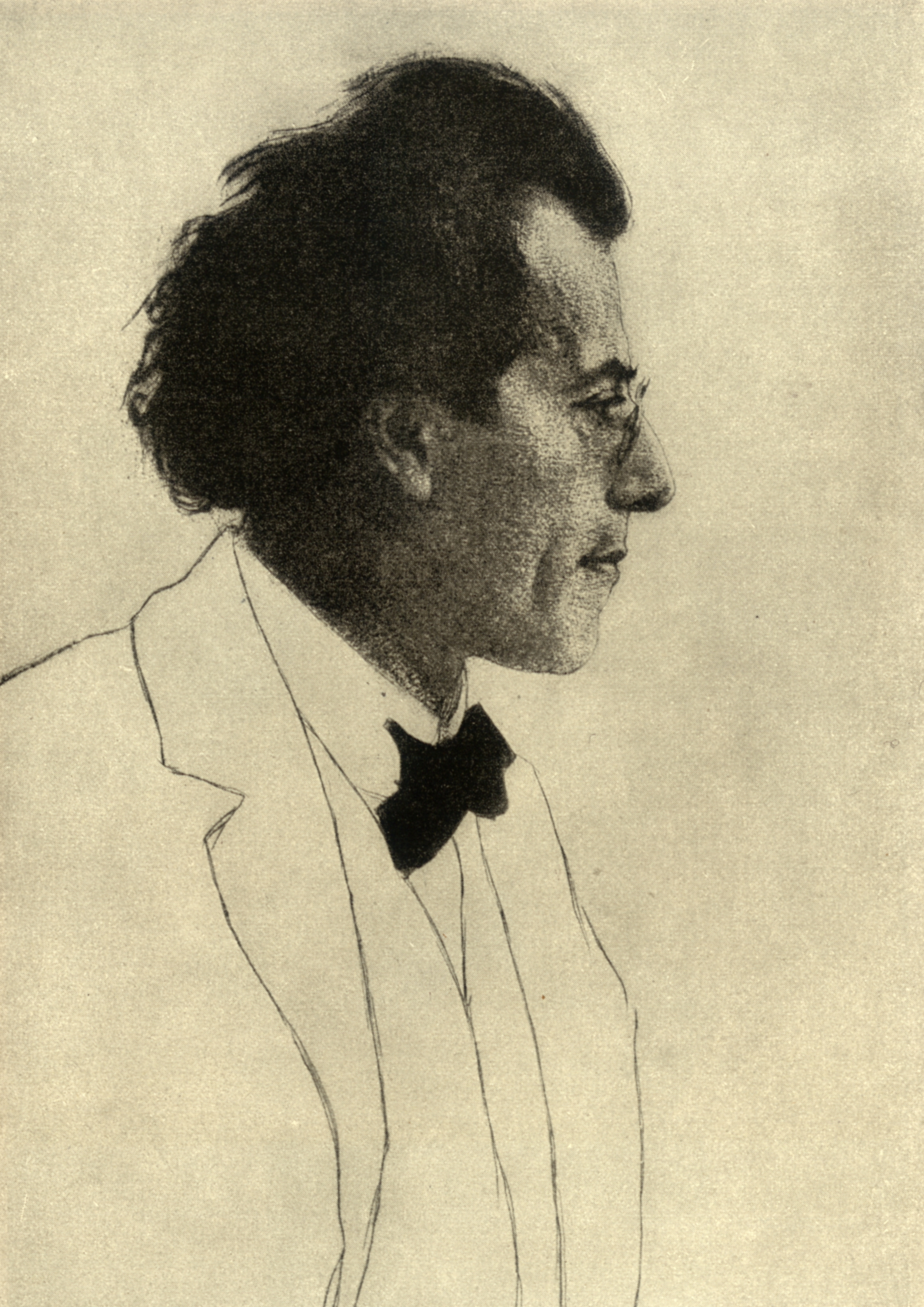
- Pencil portrait of Mahler by Emil Orlík, c. 1903
- English: Songs on the Death of Children
- Text: poems by Friedrich Rückert
- Language: German
- Composed: 1901–04
- Performed: 29 January 1905
- Duration: c. 25 minutes
- Movements: five
- Scoring: voice; orchestra

Kindertotenlieder (Songs on the Death of Children) is a song cycle (1904) for voice and orchestra by Gustav Mahler. The words of the songs are poems by Friedrich Rückert.

== Poems and setting ==
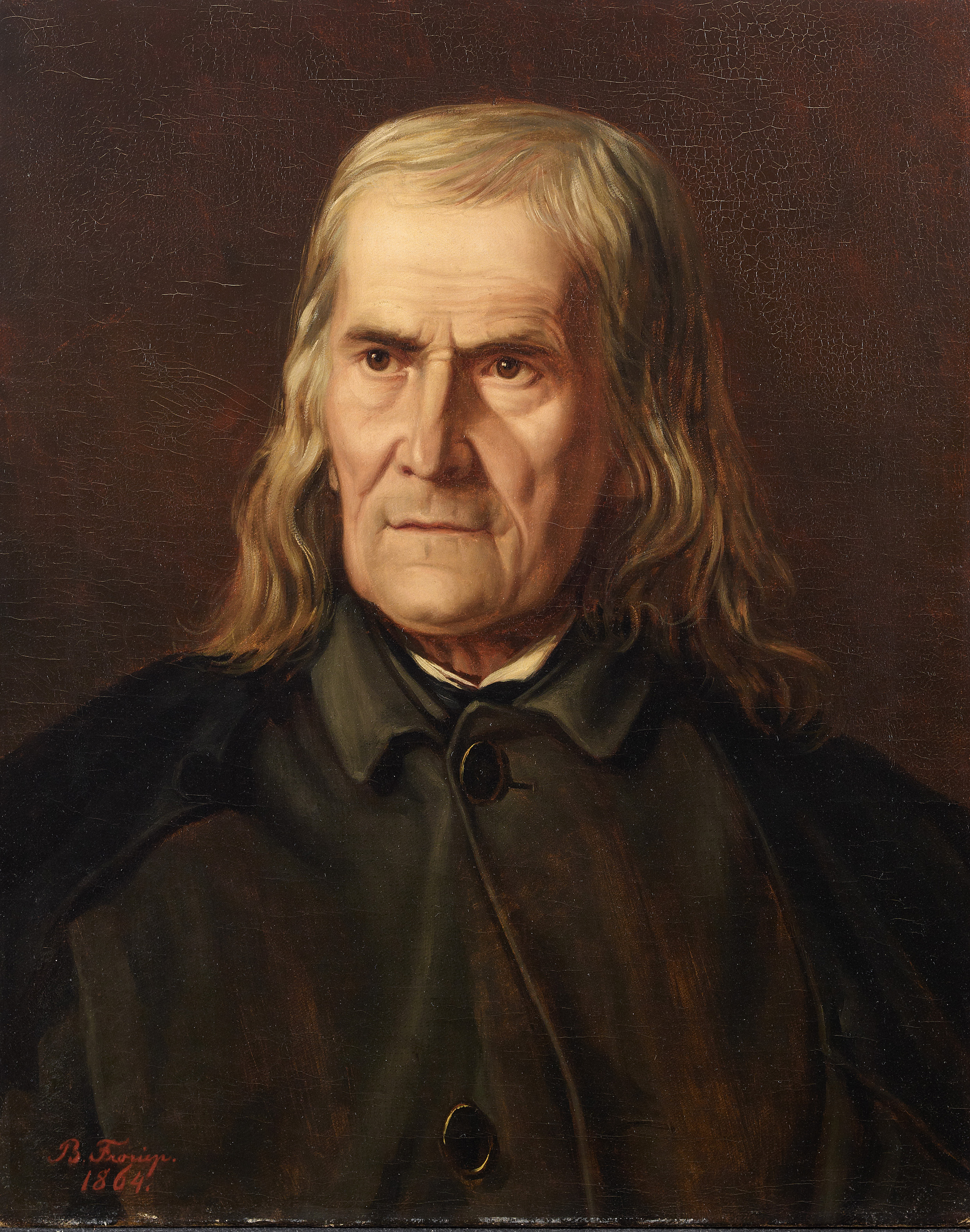
Portrait of Friedrich Rückert in 1864 by Bertha Froriep

The original Kindertodtenlieder were a group of 428 poems written by Rückert in 1833–34 in an outpouring of grief following the illness (scarlet fever) and death of two of his children. Karen Painter describes the poems thus: "Rückert's 428 poems on the death of children became singular, almost manic documents of the psychological endeavor to cope with such loss. In ever new variations Rückert's poems attempt a poetic resuscitation of the children that is punctuated by anguished outbursts. But above all the poems show a quiet acquiescence to fate and to a peaceful world of solace." These poems were not intended for publication, and they appeared in print only in 1871, five years after the poet's death.

Mahler selected five of Rückert's poems to set as Lieder, which he composed between 1901 and 1904. The songs are written in Mahler's late-romantic idiom, and like the texts reflect a mixture of feelings: anguish, fantasy resuscitation of the children, resignation. The final song ends in a major key and a mood of transcendence.

The cello melody in the postlude to "In diesem Wetter, in diesem Braus" (mm. 129–133) alludes to the first subject of the finale of Mahler's Symphony No. 3 (1895/96), a movement titled "What love tells me" ("Was mir die Liebe erzählt"). "Musically, then, this is the last word of the Kindertotenlieder: that death is powerful, yet love is even stronger."

== The Kindertotenlieder and Mahler's life history ==
1. "Nun will die Sonn' so hell aufgeh'n"

2. "Nun seh' ich wohl, warum so dunkle Flammen"

3. "Wenn dein Mütterlein"

4. "Oft denk' ich, sie sind nur ausgegangen"

5. "In diesem Wetter"
All with Dietrich Fischer-Dieskau, Berlin Philharmonic, Rudolf Kempe (1955)

At the time he wrote the work, Mahler was no stranger to the deaths of children. Hefling writes: "Such tragedy was familiar to Mahler, eight of his siblings died during their childhood. Among all of them, the death of his closest younger brother Ernst in 1875 had affected him most deeply, and he confided to [his friend] Natalie [Bauer-Lechner] that 'such frightful sorrow he had never again experienced, as great a loss he had nevermore borne'."

Mahler resumed the composition of the interrupted work (see above) in 1904, only two weeks after the birth of his own second child; this upset his wife Alma, who "found it incomprehensible and feared Mahler was tempting Providence."

Alma's fears proved all too prescient, for three years after the work had been completed the Mahlers' daughter Maria died of scarlet fever, aged four. Mahler wrote to Guido Adler: "I placed myself in the situation that a child of mine had died. When I really lost my daughter, I could not have written these songs any more."

== Composition and premiere ==
Stephen Hefling indicates that Mahler composed the first, third, and fourth songs in 1901 (he played them for his friend Natalie Bauer-Lechner on 10 August). There followed a long break, and the remaining songs were composed in the summer of 1904.

The work was premiered in Vienna on 29 January 1905. Friedrich Weidemann, a leading baritone at the Vienna Court Opera, was the soloist, and the composer conducted. The hall was selected as a relatively small one, compatible with the intimacy of the lied genre, and the orchestra was a chamber orchestra consisting of players drawn from the Vienna Philharmonic.

== Scoring and performance ==
The work is scored for a vocal soloist (the notes lie comfortably for a baritone or mezzo-soprano) and an orchestra consisting of piccolo, 2 flutes, 2 oboes, cor anglais (English horn), 2 clarinets, bass clarinet, 2 bassoons, contrabassoon, 4 horns, timpani, glockenspiel, tam-tam, celesta, harp, and strings. Deployed at chamber-orchestra scale, this instrumentation permitted Mahler to explore a wide variety of timbres within a smaller-scale sound; Tunbridge sees this as a new precedent adopted by later composers, for example Schoenberg in Pierrot Lunaire.

Concerning the performance of the work, the composer wrote "these five songs are intended as one inseparate unit, and in performing them their continuity should not be interfered with".

The work takes about 25 minutes to perform.

In 2021 British composer David Matthews, who assisted Deryck Cooke on his performing version of the 10th Symphony, created a reduced orchestration of the cycle for Sarah Connolly and the BBC Philharmonic Orchestra.

== Text ==
"Nun will die Sonn' so hell aufgeh'n" (D minor)
Nun will die Sonn' so hell aufgeh'n
als sei kein Unglück die Nacht gescheh'n.
Das Unglück geschah nur mir allein.
Die Sonne, sie scheinet allgemein.

Du mußt nicht die Nacht in dir verschränken
mußt sie ins ew'ge Licht versenken.
Ein Lämplein verlosch in meinem Zelt,
Heil sei dem Freudenlicht der Welt.

"Nun seh' ich wohl, warum so dunkle Flammen" (C minor)
Nun seh' ich wohl, warum so dunkle Flammen
ihr sprühtet mir in manchem Augenblicke.
O Augen, gleichsam, um in einem Blicke
zu drängen eure ganze Macht zusammen.

Doch ahnt' ich nicht, weil Nebel mich umschwammen,
gewoben vom verblendenden Geschicke,
daß sich der Strahl bereits zur Heimkehr schicke,
dorthin, von wannen alle Strahlen stammen.

Ihr wolltet mir mit eurem Leuchten sagen:
Wir möchten nah dir immer bleiben gerne!
Doch ist uns das vom Schicksal abgeschlagen.

Sieh' recht uns an, denn bald sind wir dir ferne!
Was dir noch Augen sind in diesen Tagen:
In künft'gen Nächten sind es dir nur Sterne.

"Wenn dein Mütterlein" (C minor)
Wenn dein Mütterlein
tritt zur Tür herein,
und den Kopf ich drehe,
ihr entgegen sehe,
fällt auf ihr Gesicht
erst der Blick mir nicht,
sondern auf die Stelle,
näher nach der Schwelle,
dort, wo würde dein
lieb Gesichtchen sein.
Wenn du freudenhelle
trätest mit herein,
wie sonst, mein Töchterlein.

Wenn dein Mütterlein
tritt zur Tür herein,
mit der Kerze Schimmer,
ist es mir, als immer
kämst du mit herein,
huschtest hinterdrein,
als wie sonst ins Zimmer!
O du, des Vaters Zelle,
ach, zu schnell
erlosch'ner Freudenschein!

"Oft denk' ich, sie sind nur ausgegangen" (E-flat major)
Oft denk' ich, sie sind nur ausgegangen,
bald werden sie wieder nach Hause gelangen.
Der Tag ist schön, o sei nicht bang,
sie machen nur einen weiten Gang.

Ja wohl, sie sind nur ausgegangen,
und werden jetzt nach Hause gelangen.
O, sei nicht bang, der Tag ist schön,
sie machen einen Gang zu jenen Höh'n.

Sie sind uns nur voraus gegangen,
und werden nicht wieder nach Hause verlangen.
Wir holen sie ein auf jenen Höh'n
im Sonnenschein, der Tag ist schön,
auf jenen Höh'n.

"In diesem Wetter" (D minor–D major)
In diesem Wetter, in diesem Braus,
nie hätt' ich gesendet die Kinder hinaus;
man hat sie getragen hinaus,
ich durfte nichts dazu sagen!

In diesem Wetter, in diesem Saus,
nie hätt' ich gelassen die Kinder hinaus;
ich fürchtete sie erkranken,
das sind nun eitle Gedanken.

In diesem Wetter, in diesem Graus,
Nie hätt' ich gelassen die Kinder hinaus;
ich sorgte, sie stürben morgen,
das ist nun nicht zu besorgen.

In diesem Wetter, in diesem Graus!
Nie hätt' ich gesendet die Kinder hinaus!
Man hat sie hinaus getragen,
ich durfte nichts dazu sagen!

In diesem Wetter, in diesem Saus, in diesem Braus,
sie ruh'n als wie in der Mutter Haus,
von keinem Sturm erschrecket,
von Gottes Hand bedecket.

"Now the sun wants to rise as brightly"
Now the sun wants to rise as brightly
As if nothing terrible had happened during the night.
The misfortune happened only to me,
But the sun shines equally on everyone.

You must not fold the night into yourself.
You must bathe it in eternal light.
A little lamp has gone out in my tent.
I must greet the joyful light of the world.

"Now I see why with such dark flames"
Now I see why with such dark flames
Your eyes flash at me in certain moments.
O eyes, it was as if in a single glance
You could concentrate your full power.

Yet I didn't realize, because mists were floating around me,
Woven by a blinding fate,
That your beam of light was ready to be sent home,
To the place from which all beams emanate.

You wanted to tell me with your light:
We really want to stay near you forever!
But that was taken away by fate.

Look straight at us, because soon we will be far away!
What to you are only eyes in these days,
In the nights to come will be only stars.

"When your mama"
When your mama
steps in through the door
and I turn my head
to see her,
on her face
my gaze does not first fall,
but at the place
nearer the doorstep,
there, where your
dear little face would be,
when you with bright joy
would step inside,
as you used to, my little daughter.

When your mama
steps in through the door
with the glowing candle,
it seems to me, as if you always
came in with her too,
hurrying behind her,
as you used to come into the room.
Oh you, of a father's cell,
ah, too soon
extinguished joyful light!

"I often think that they have just stepped out"
I often think that they have just stepped out
And that they will be coming home soon.
The day is fine, don't be worried,
They've just gone for a long walk.

Yes indeed, they have just stepped out,
And now they are making their way home.
Don't be worried, the day is fine.
They have simply made a journey to those hills.

They have just gone out ahead of us,
And they will not be coming home again.
We'll go meet them on those hills,
In the sunlight, the day is fine
On those hills.

"In this weather"
In this weather, in this windy storm,
I would never have sent the children out.
They have been carried off,
I wasn't able to warn them!

In this weather, in this gale,
I would never have let the children out.
I feared they sickened:
those thoughts are now in vain.

In this weather, in this storm,
I would never have let the children out,
I was anxious they might die the next day:
now anxiety is pointless.

In this weather, in this windy storm,
I would never have sent the children out.
They have been carried off,
I wasn't able to warn them!

In this weather, in this gale, in this windy storm,
they rest as if in their mother's house:
frightened by no storm,
sheltered by the Hand of God.
