= Hänsel und Gretel (John Pritchard recording) =

- CBS Masterworks LP: 79217

Studio album by John Pritchard
- Released: 1979
- Studio: Erholungshaus, Leverkusen, Germany
- Genre: Opera
- Length: 107:42
- Language: German
- Label: CBS Masterworks
- Producer: David Mottley

Alternative cover
- CBS Masterworks CD: M2K 79217

Hänsel und Gretel is a 107-minute studio album of Engelbert Humperdinck's 1893 opera of the same name, performed by Ileana Cotrubaș, Dame Kiri Te Kanawa, Christa Ludwig, Siegmund Nimsgern, Elisabeth Söderström, Frederica von Stade and Ruth Welting with the Children's Chorus of Cologne Opera and the Gürzenich Orchestra under the direction of Sir John Pritchard. It was released in 1979.

== Recording ==
The album was recorded using analogue technology in June 1978 in the concert hall of the Bayer chemical company: the Erholungshaus at Leverkusen near Cologne in Germany.

== Packaging ==
The cover of the CD version of the album, designed under the art direction of Allen Weinberg, features a design by Henrietta Condak using art created by Renate Ross and photographed by Don Hunstein.

== Critical reception ==
=== Reviews ===
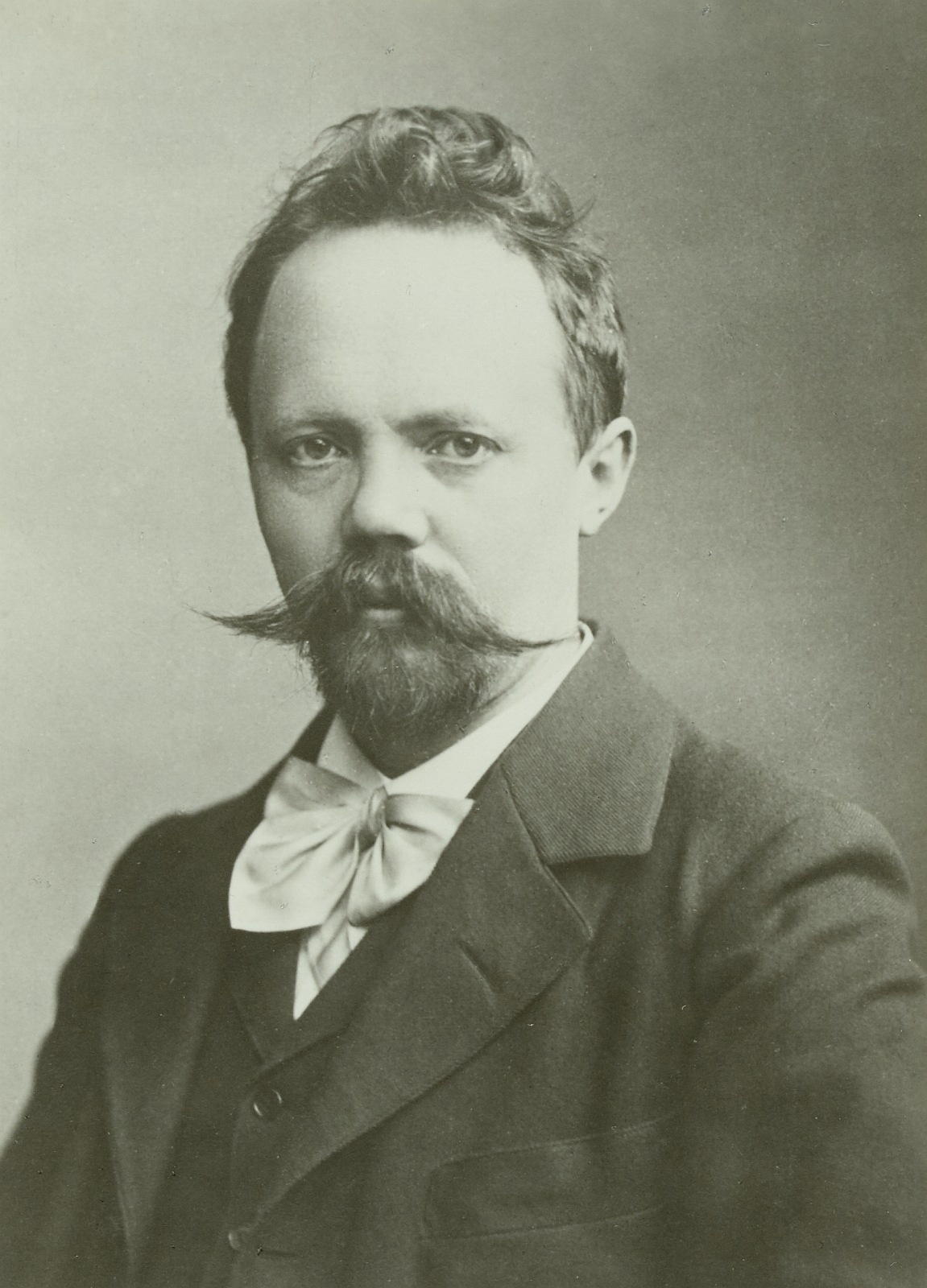
Engelbert Humperdinck in 1854

Lionel Salter reviewed the album in Gramophone in October 1979, comparing it with earlier recordings conducted by Herbert von Karajan and Sir Georg Solti. In the title roles, he wrote, Frederica von Stade and Ileana Cotrubaș were as successful as Elisabeth Grümmer and Elisabeth Schwarzkopf had been on Karajan's album (which, although a quarter of a century old, still held "an unshakeable place in the gramophone Pantheon"). As singers, they blended beautifully. As actors, they were "very distinctive and completely inside their characters", von Stade "headstrong and boyish", Cotrubaș "gently feminine", both animating their words with emotion and meaning. Hänsel's bravery in the darkling forest and Gretel's wonder at the gingerbread house were just two examples of how von Stade and Cotrubaș infused their parts with imagination. As the Sandman, Kiri Te Kanawa was "irresistibly soothing", "the falling fourths and fifths at the end of hir first phrases most seductively sung". As the Dew Fairy, Ruth Welting was "as sparkling bright as dew itself". (The choice of two such radically different sopranos for the roles was among the album's points of distinction from Karajan's, which had employed the same singer for both.) As the children's parents, Siegmund Nimsgern was "jovial" and unusually youthful sounding, Christa Ludwig somewhat shrill in her portrayal of her character's weary irritation. Elisabeth Söderström was "the best interpreter of the [Witch that] I have ever heard", presenting a "picture of crazy malevolence" not by "the constant hamminess to which others resort" but by "touches of caricature allied to odious wheedling and horrid glee". The children's chorus had timbres sufficiently like von Stade's and Cotrubaș's to help listeners suspend their disbelief that the soloists were children too. The playing of the Bayreuth-scale orchestra was "sensitive to every nuance in Humperdinck's entrancing score, whose elaborate contrapuntal texture is presented with the utmost lucidity". John Pritchard's conducting was the only element of the album that was open to serious criticism. His reading was one of "meticulousness and lyricism", but his preference for a "relaxed, leisurely pace" meant that his album was not as exciting as Karajan's or, especially, Solti's. CBS's engineering was almost perfect, with voices and instruments ideally balanced and the illusion of a theatrical performance convincingly maintained - such technical challenges as a cuckoo, echo effects, spilling milk and the father's approach to his home were all negotiated satisfactorily. The producer's only mistakes were an unduly distant violin solo and putting the parents too far apart on the stereo soundstage. All in all, no other recording of the opera had come closer to usurping Karajan's place at the pinnacle of its discography.

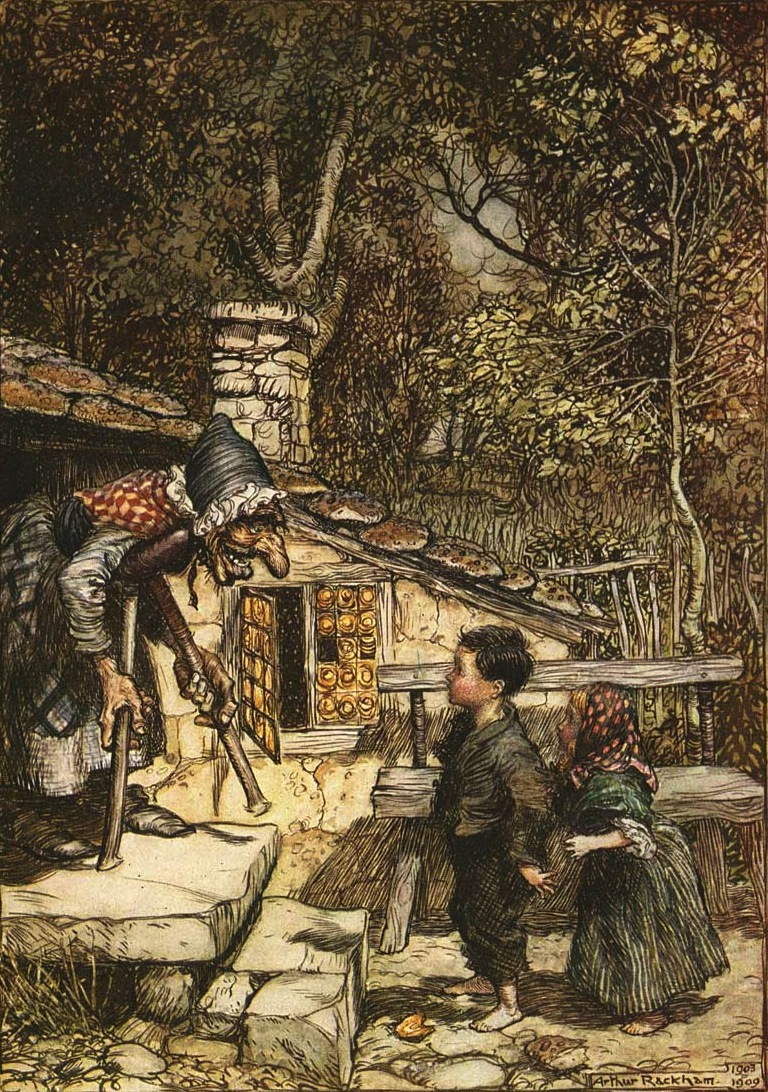
Hänsel and Gretel meet the Witch, in a 1909 painting by Arthur Rackham

George Jellinek reviewed the album on LP in Stereo Review in December 1979. Frederica von Stade and Ileana Cotrubaș, he wrote, offered the most "ear-caressing concord of female voices in one opera" that he had heard for twenty years. They were "both youthful sounding, both lively, believable and enchanting". Kiri Te Kanawa was "ravishing" as the Sandman, and as the Dew Fairy, Ruth Welting provided "another impressive display of the high-flying, ethereal 'fairy music' that seems to be her speciality". Elisabeth Söderström built her witch from nicely measured rations of malice and nasality rather than from a mess of tasteless exaggerations. Siegmund Nimsgern was a "hearty, energetic Father", virile and adept, outclassing a Christa Ludwig "not in her best voice" as his wife. The chorus and orchestra were both "good, if perhaps slightly below virtuoso calibre". John Pritchard accompanied his singers sensitively but was unduly cautious at the opera's climaxes. The album's audio was somewhat recessed and congested and not always ideally balanced, although not to the extent of disqualifying the recording from being "superb".

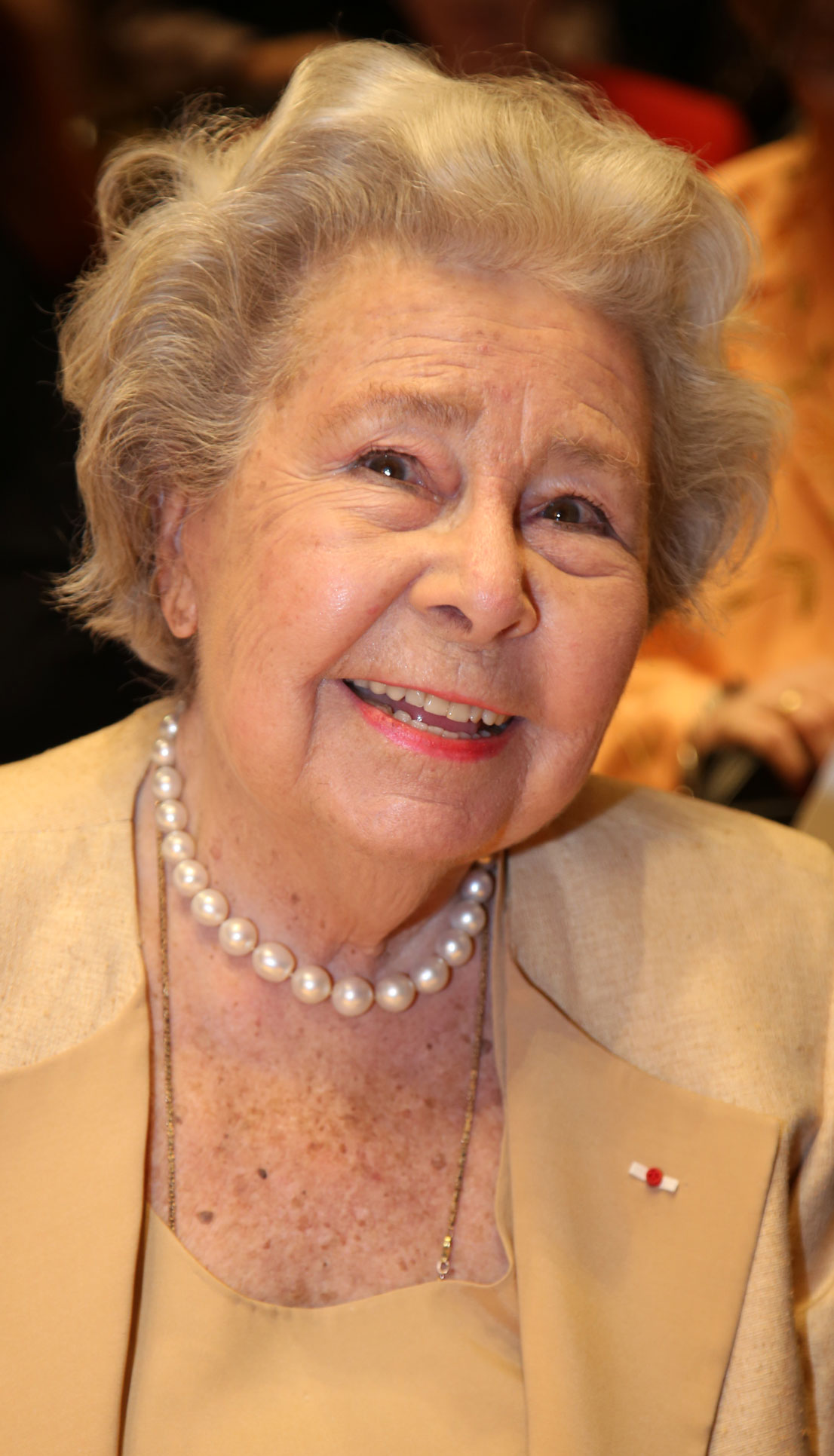
Christa Ludwig

J. B. Steane reviewed the album on LP in Gramophone in January 1980. Frederica von Stade's and Ileana Cotrubaș's children, he wrote, "should certainly be their parents' pride and joy, a charming couple, put to sleep by a particularly charming Sandman, [Kiri] Te Kanawa". While enjoying the "delightful" Elisabeth Söderström's Witch, he thought that she had been miscast, as had Christa Ludwig as the Mother, on other occasions a "brilliant" Witch herself. John Pritchard's conducting disappointed him, with tempi erring on the slow side and a wan orchestral palette. The album offered many pleasures, but was in general "a little muted".

Edward Greenfield reviewed the album on CD in Gramophone in November 1988, comparing it with the recently released CD version of Solti's recording of the opera. Frederica von Stade and Ileana Cotrubaș characterized the children "delicately", he wrote, conveying "freshness and childish innocence" with technique of the utmost expertise. Readers who were concerned that Cotrubaș's contribution might be marred by her increasingly conspicuous vibrato could be reassured that on this album, it was scarcely noticeable. As the Sandman. offering some of the album's "most ravishing singing of all", Kiri Te Kanawa brought a golden tone to set long side the silver of Ruth Welting's Dew Fairy. Elisabeth Söderström's Witch crossed the dividing line between acting and caricature, but at least fell short of frank grotesqueness. The "element of rawness" in Christa Ludwig's account of the Mother could be forgiven as dramatically appropriate. Siegmund Nimsgern's "upstanding" Father was notably younger sounding than the middle-aged norm. The playing of the orchestra was "beautifully pointed" and sounded like the work of musicians who had performed the work in the pit of a theatre. Greenfield shared Salter's and Steane's perception that John Pritchard's tempi were on the slow side, but felt that his "genial, ... winning" way with the score was a plus rather than a minus, even in the macabre thrills of the Witch's Ride. Reversing what had been the case in the vinyl era, the audio quality of CBS's CDs was better than Decca's, with "warmth, ... bloom and a very natural balance, mirroring the performance itself".

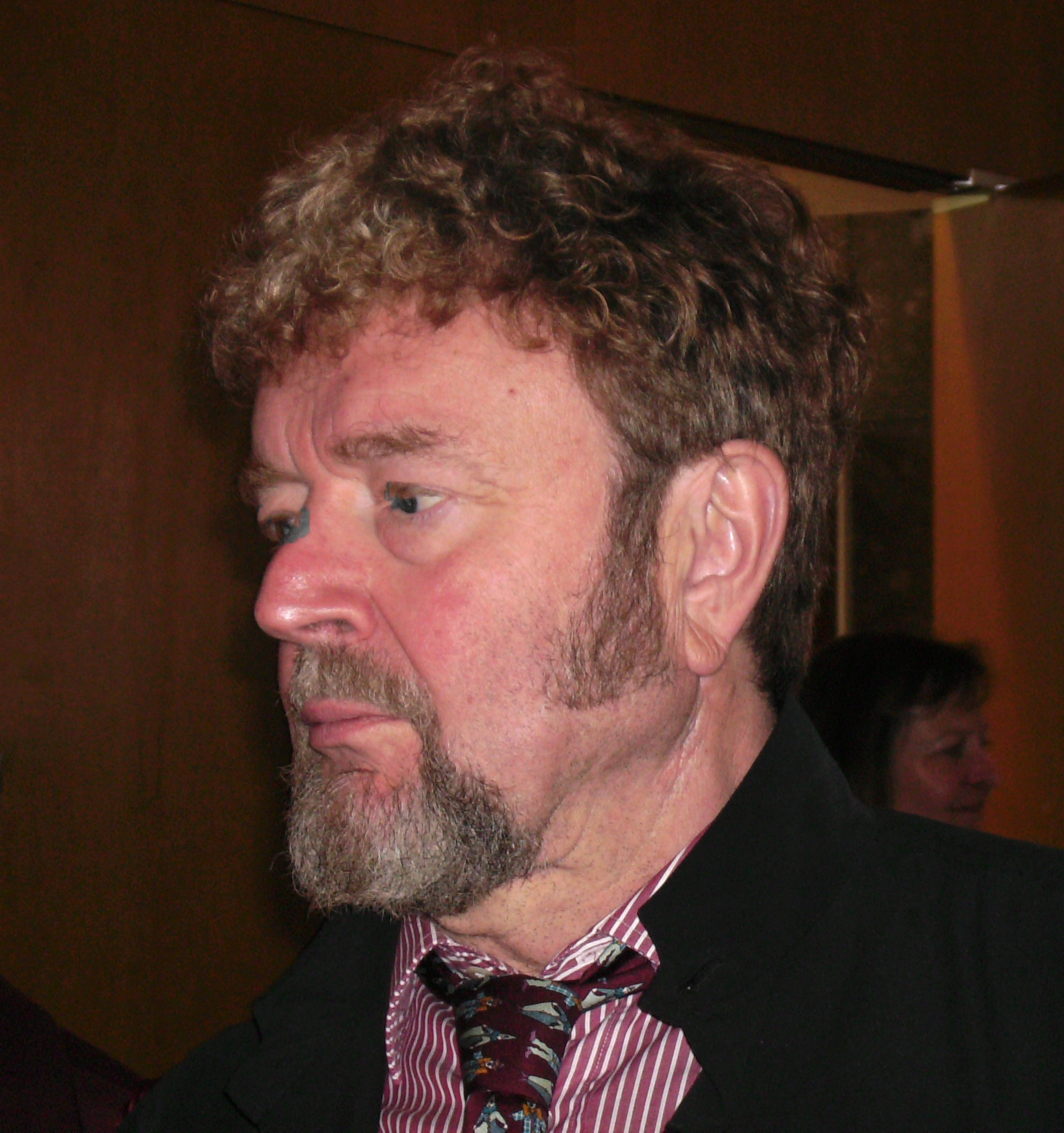
Siegmund Nimsgern

Alan Blyth mentioned the album in a survey of the opera's discography in Gramophone in December 2002. Frederica von Stade, he wrote, was "full-hearted and keen in tone" but sometimes failed to project her words clearly. Ileana Cotrubaș was "sympathetic and unforced", her idiosyncratic timbre coaxing the ear's affection. The "arch" contrivances that Elisabeth Söderström deployed as the Witch were less appropriate to "old Rosina Scrummychops" than to the Rossinian Cat Duet. John Pritchard's conducting was the polar opposite of Georg Solti's on Decca's rival album. Where Solti's was "prompt, sometimes hard-hearted", Pritchard's was "easy-going, sometimes stodgy".

=== Accolades ===
In December 1979, Stereo Review named the album one of the best Recordings of the Month. Also in December 1979, Lionel Salter included the album in his Gramophone Critic's Choice list of the best records of the year.

== Track listing: CD1 ==
Engelbert Humperdinck: Hänsel und Gretel (1893), Märchenspiel in drei Bildern (Fairy play in three tableaux), with a libretto by Humperdinck's sister, Adelheid Wette, after Grimms' Fairy Tales

Act 1 – At home

1. Prelude (8:23)
2. "Suse, liebe Suse" (Gretel, Hänsel) (5:54)
3. "Brüderchen, komm tanz mit mir" (Gretel, Hänsel) (3:47)
4. "Holla!" (Mother, Hänsel, Gretel) (3:54)
5. "Ral-la-la-la" (Father, Mother) (6:28)
6. "Doch halt, wo bleiben die Kinder?" (Father, Mother) (3:12)
7. "Eine Hex', steinalt" (Father, Mother) (2:39)

Act 2 – In the forest

8. Prelude: the witches' ride (4:37)
9. "Ein Männlein steht im Walde" (Gretel, Hänsel) (3:27)
10. "Kuckuck, Kuckuck" (Hänsel, Gretel) (7:25)
11. "Der kleine Sandmann bin ich" (Little Sandman, Hänsel, Gretel) (2:59)
12. "Abends will ich schlafen gehn" (Gretel, Hänsel) (3:15)
13. Pantomime: the descent of the angels (5:22)

== Track listing: CD2 ==
Act 3 – The gingerbread house

1. Prelude (2:16)
2. "Der kleine Taumann heiss ich" (Little Dewman) (2:07)
3. "Wo bin ich?" (Gretel) (1:52)
4. "Sieh' da, der faule" (Gretel, Hänsel) (4:08)
5. "Bleib' stehn!" (Gretel, Hänsel, Witch) (4:46)
6. "Knusper, knusper Häuschen" (Witch, Hänsel, Gretel) (4:53)
7. "Kommt, kleine Mäuslein" (Witch, Hänsel, Gretel) (3:23)
8. "Halt!... Hokus pokus" (Witch) (1:39)
9. "Nun Gretel" (Witch, Gretel, Hänsel) (5:35)
10. "Hurr hopp hopp hopp" (Witch) (1:50)
11. "Auf, wach' auf" (Witch, Gretel, Hänsel) (4:06)
12. Dance / "Da sieh nur die artigen Kinderlein!" (Gretel, Hänsel) (2:51)
13. "Erlöst, befreit" (Gingerbread Children, Gretel, Hänsel, Father) (4:36)
14. "Vater! Mutter!" (Hänsel, Gretel, Mother, Father, Gingerbread Children) (2:18)

== Personnel ==
=== Musical ===
- Siegmund Nimsgern (bass-baritone), Peter, a broom-maker, father of Hänsel and Gretel
- Christa Ludwig (mezzo-soprano), Gertrud, mother of Hänsel and Gretel
- Frederica von Stade (mezzo-soprano), Hänsel
- Ileana Cotrubaș (soprano), Gretel
- Dame Kiri Te Kanawa (soprano), the Little Sandman
- Ruth Welting (soprano), the Little Dewman (the Dew Fairy)
- Elisabeth Söderström (soprano), the Gingerbread Witch
- Children's Chorus of Cologne Opera
- Gürzenich Orchestra Cologne
- Sir John Pritchard (conductor

=== Other ===
- David Mottley, producer
- Hartwig Paulsen, engineer
- Mike Ross-Trevor, engineer
- Vivienne H. Taylor, production co-ordinator

== Release history ==
In 1979, CBS Masterworks issued the album as a double LP (catalogue number 79321 in the UK, M2 35898 in the USA) and a double cassette (catalogue number 40-79127), both with notes, texts and translations.

In 1988, CBS Masterworks issued the album as a double CD (catalogue number M2K 79217 in the UK, M2K 35898 in the USA) in a clamshell box with a 160-page booklet. The booklet, printed in gingerbread-coloured ink, includes essays in English by Barrymore Laurence Scherer and Bruno Bettelheim, an essay in French by Marcel Marnat, an essay in German by Karl Dietrich Gräwe, an essay in Italian by Franco Soprano, synopses in English, French and German and libretti in English, French, German and Italian. It is illustrated with photographs of Nimsgern, Ludwig, von Stade, Cotrubaș, Te Kanawa, Welting, Söderström, Pritchard and the children's chorus, four photographs taken during recording, a drawing and two photographs of Humperdinck and five vintage images of scenes from the story.
