= John Pritchard (conductor) =

English conductor (1921–1989)

Sir John Michael Pritchard, CBE (born Stanley Frederick Pritchard, 5 February 1921 – 5 December 1989) was an English conductor. He was known for his interpretations of Mozart operas and for his support of contemporary music.

== Life and career ==
Pritchard was born in Walthamstow, Essex, to a musical family. His father, Albert Edward Pritchard, was a violinist with the London Symphony Orchestra. The young Pritchard was educated at the Monoux School and studied violin, piano, and conducting in Italy.

Pritchard, as a conscientious objector, refused to serve in the Second World War, but was in any case unfit on medical grounds. In 1943 he took over the semi-professional Derby String Orchestra and was its principal conductor until 1951. He joined the music staff of Glyndebourne Festival Opera in 1947 and was appointed chorus master in 1949. He remained associated with Glyndebourne for most of his career, as conductor, music counsellor (from 1963), principal conductor (1968) and musical director (1969–1978).

Beyond Glyndebourne, Pritchard appeared with the Royal Philharmonic Orchestra, at Edinburgh in 1952 (deputising for Ernest Ansermet, who was ill). He made his début at the Royal Opera House in 1951 and at the Vienna State Opera in 1952. He appeared regularly with the Vienna Symphony (1953–1955).

For Glyndebourne in this period, Pritchard conducted Mozart's Idomeneo and Richard Strauss's Ariadne auf Naxos at the Edinburgh festivals of 1953 and 1954 and Rossini's La Cenerentola at the Berlin Festival.

In 1957, Pritchard was appointed principal conductor of the Royal Liverpool Philharmonic, where he launched the Musica Viva series showcasing contemporary music. His success in Liverpool led to his appointment as principal conductor of the London Philharmonic Orchestra (1962–1966). Freelancing after leaving the LPO, he conducted concerts in Berlin, Leipzig, Dresden, Philadelphia and the Far East, and opera in Buenos Aires, Chicago, San Francisco, New York, Salzburg, Florence, and Munich. In 1973, he conducted the LPO in China, the first visit to China by a British orchestra.

Pritchard became chief guest conductor of the BBC Symphony Orchestra in 1978, and subsequently served as its chief conductor from 1982 to 1989, the first BBC SO chief guest conductor to become its chief conductor. In this capacity, he conducted his first and only Last Night of the Proms in 1989, the year of his death. He served as Generalmusikdirektor of the Cologne Opera (1978–1989) and music director of La Monnaie (1981). He was the first titled music director of the San Francisco Opera, from 1986 until his death in 1989. At the time of his death, he was preparing Wagner's Ring cycle for San Francisco.

Pritchard was appointed a Commander of the Order of the British Empire (CBE) in 1962 and knighted in 1983. The prestigious Shakespeare Prize was awarded him in 1975 by the Hamburg-based Alfred Toepfer Foundation.

Pritchard died in 1989 in Daly City, California, with lung cancer as the reported cause of death. His partner, Terrence MacInnes, survived him.

== Repertoire ==
Pritchard was a champion of a wide range of new music, conducting the premieres of Britten's Gloriana and Tippett's The Midsummer Marriage and King Priam, all at Covent Garden, and the British première of Henze's Elegy for Young Lovers at Glyndebourne. Of the classics of the repertoire he was noted for his Mozart and Richard Strauss. His recordings include Idomeneo, L'incoronazione di Poppea, Falstaff, Macbeth, Hansel and Gretel, L'elisir d'amore (with Plácido Domingo), Il segreto di Susanna (with Renata Scotto and Renato Bruson), Lucia di Lammermoor and La traviata (the last two with Joan Sutherland).

== Discography ==
Donizetti

- Lucia di Lammermoor – Joan Sutherland (Lucia), André Turp (Edgardo), John Shaw (Enrico), Joseph Rouleau (Raimondo), Kenneth MacDonald (Arturo), Margreta Elkins (Alisa), Edgar Evans (Normanno), Chorus & Orchestra of the Royal Opera House, Covent Garden, John Pritchard, recorded 1961 – Celestial Audio CA 345

Humperdinck

- Hänsel und Gretel - Frederica von Stade (Hänsel), Ileana Cotrubas (Gretel), Kiri Te Kanawa (Little Sandman), Ruth Welting (Dew Fairy), Elisabeth Söderström (Witch), Siegmund Nimsgern (Father), Christa Ludwig (Mother), Children's Chorus of the Cologne Opera, Gürzenich Orchestra, John Pritchard, recorded 1978 - Sony M2K 79217; for details, see here

Mozart

- Idomeneo – Richard Lewis (Idomeneo), Leopold Simoneau (Idamante), Sena Jurinac (Ilia), Lucille Udovick (Elettra), Chorus & Orchestra of the Glyndebourne Festival, John Pritchard, recorded 1956

== Videography ==
- The Metropolitan Opera Centennial Gala (1983), Deutsche Grammophon DVD, 00440-073-4538

== Sources ==
- Conway, Helen (1994). Sir John Pritchard: His Life in Music. London: Andre Deutsch Ltd. ISBN 0-233-98845-9.

Cultural offices
Preceded by Vittorio Gui	Music Director, Glyndebourne Opera Festival; 1964–1977	Succeeded by Bernard Haitink
Preceded by István Kertész	Generalmusikdirektor, Oper Köln; 1978–1989	Succeeded by James Conlon
Preceded by (no titled predecessor)	Music Director, San Francisco Opera; 1986–1989	Succeeded by Donald Runnicles
