= Hansel and Gretel (opera) =

1893 opera by Engelbert and Adelheid Humperdinck

Hänsel und Gretel
- Märchenoper by Engelbert Humperdinck
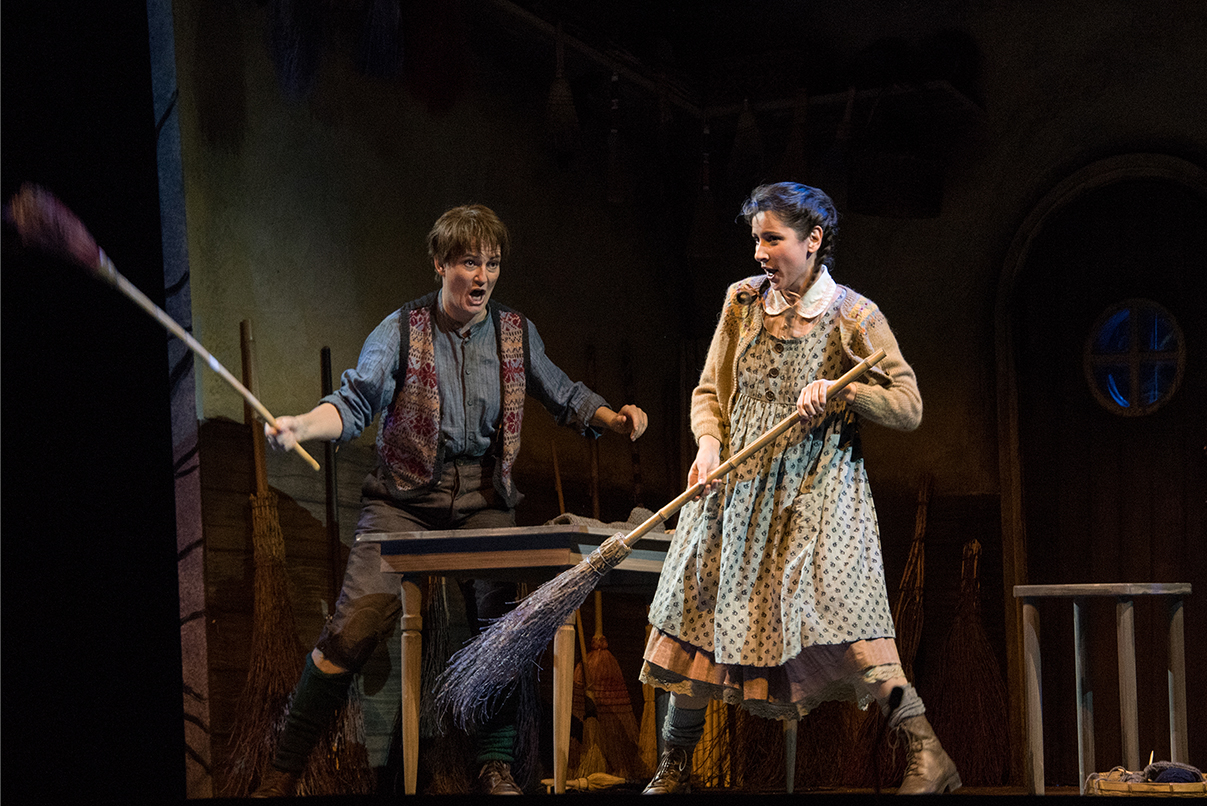
- Scene at the Vienna State Opera, 2015
- Librettist: Adelheid Wette
- Language: German
- Based on: "Hansel and Gretel" by the Brothers Grimm
- Premiere: 23 December 1893; Hoftheater in Weimar

Hansel and Gretel (German: Hänsel und Gretel) is an opera by nineteenth-century composer Engelbert Humperdinck, who described it as a Märchenoper (fairy-tale opera). The libretto was written by Humperdinck's sister, Adelheid Wette, based on the Grimm brothers' fairy tale of the same name. It is much admired for its folk music-inspired themes, one of the most famous being the "Abendsegen" ("Evening Benediction") from act 2.

The idea for the opera was proposed to Humperdinck by his sister, who approached him about writing music for songs that she had written for her children for Christmas based on "Hansel and Gretel". After several revisions, the musical sketches and the songs were turned into a full-scale opera.

Humperdinck composed Hansel and Gretel in Frankfurt in 1891 and 1892. The opera was first performed in the Hoftheater in Weimar on 23 December 1893, conducted by Richard Strauss. It has been associated with Christmas since its earliest performances and today it is still most often performed at Christmas time. "Abends will ich schlafen gehn" is a well known duet from the opera.

== Performance history ==
Hansel and Gretel was first conducted in Weimar by Richard Strauss in 1893, followed by its Hamburg premiere on 25 September 1894, conducted by Gustav Mahler. Its first performance outside Germany was in Basel, Switzerland, on 16 November 1894. The first performance in England was in London on 26 December 1894, at Daly's Theatre and its first United States performance was on 8 October 1895 in New York. The first performance in Australia was on 6 April 1907, at the Princess Theatre, Melbourne.

In English-speaking countries Hansel and Gretel is most often performed in English. The longtime standard English translation was by Constance Bache. In the United States the opera was often performed in a translation by Norman Kelley written for the Metropolitan Opera's 1967 production by Nathaniel Merrill and Robert O'Hearn. In 1987 a darkly comic new production with English translation by David Pountney was created for the English National Opera in London. Since 2007, the Met has performed the work in a production originally created for the Welsh National Opera using Pountney's translation.

== Roles ==
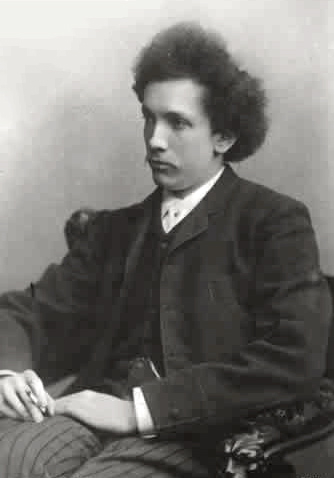
Strauss in 1894

Roles, voice types, premiere cast
Role	Voice type	Premiere cast, 23 December 1893 Conductor: Richard Strauss
Peter, (Note: While the father and mother are given names in the score, their names are never said on stage. Instead they are always referred to as "Father" and "Mother", even when they speak to each other.) broom-maker	baritone	Ferdinand Wiedey
Gertrud, his wife	mezzo-soprano	Luise Tibelti
Hansel, their son	mezzo-soprano	Ida Schubert
Gretel, their daughter	soprano	Marie Kayser
The Gingerbread Witch	mezzo-soprano (Note: The role of the Witch is sometimes sung by a tenor, or the roles of Mother/Witch by the same singer.)	Hermine Finck
Sandman, the Sleep Fairy	soprano	Frl. Hartwig
Dewman, the Dew Fairy	soprano	Frl. Hartwig
Chorus of echoes	three sopranos, two altos	
Children's chorus		
Ballet (14 angels)		

== Synopsis ==
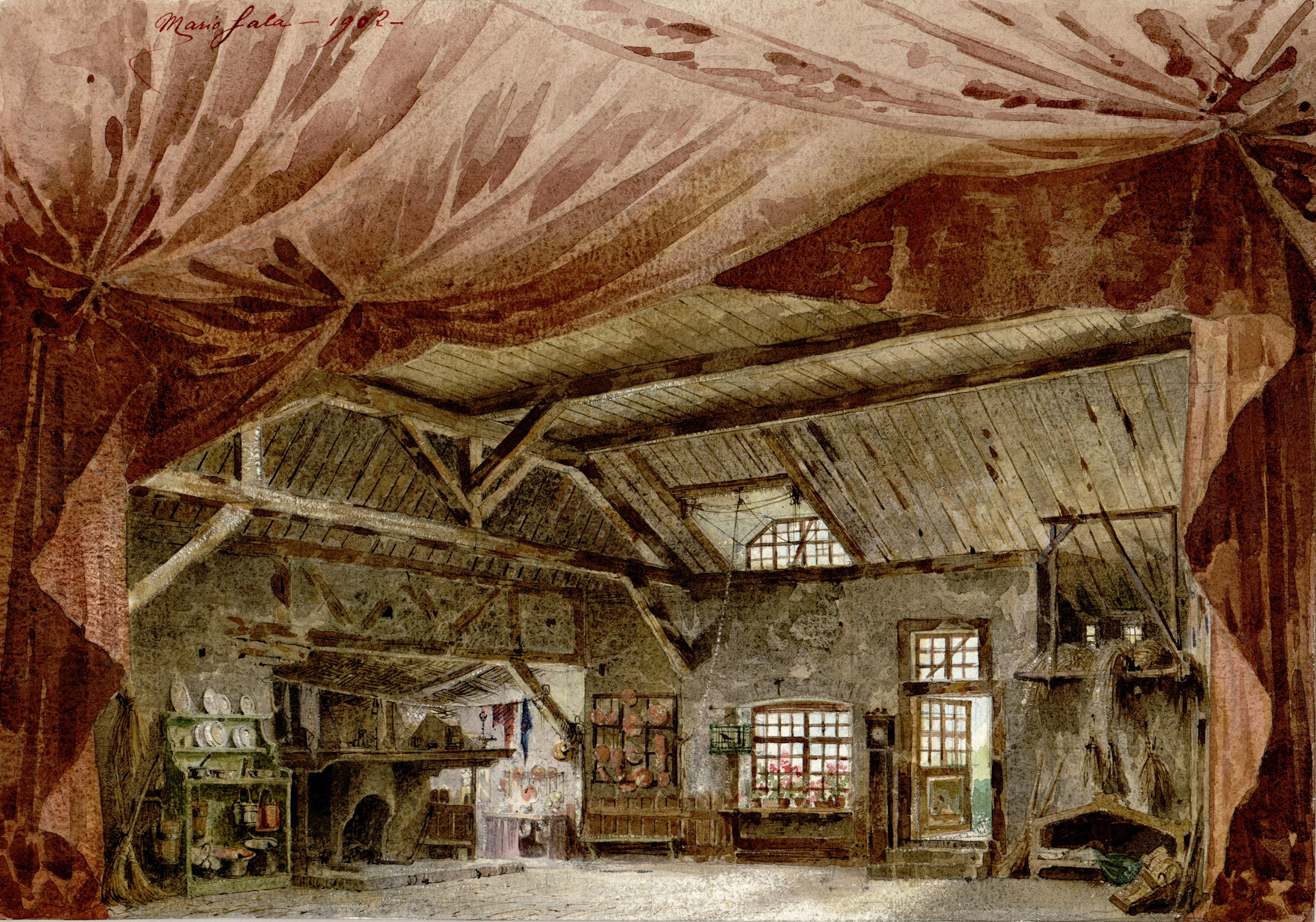
Set design by Mario Sala in 1902

=== Act 1 ===
Scene 1: At home

Gretel stitches a stocking, and Hansel is making a broom. Gretel sings to herself as she works. Hansel mocks her, singing to the same tune a song about how hungry he is. He wishes for mother to come home. Gretel tells him to be quiet and reminds him of what father always says: "When the need is greatest, God the Lord puts out His hand." Hansel complains that one cannot eat words, and Gretel cheers him up by telling him a secret: A neighbor has given mother a jug of milk, and tonight she will make a rice blancmange for them to eat. Hansel, excited, tastes the cream on the top of the milk. Gretel scolds him and tells him he should get back to work. Hansel says that he does not want to work, he would rather dance. Gretel agrees, and they begin to dance around.

Scene 2

Mother enters, and she is furious when she finds that Hansel and Gretel have not been working. As she threatens to beat them with a stick, she knocks over the jug of milk. Mother sends Hansel and Gretel to the haunted Ilsenstein forest to look for strawberries. Alone, she expresses her sorrow that she is unable to feed her children, and asks God for help.

Scene 3

From far off, father sings about how hungry he is. He bursts into the house, roaring drunk, and kisses mother roughly. She pushes him away and scolds him for being drunk. He surprises her by taking from his pack a feast: Bacon, butter, flour, sausages, fourteen eggs, beans, onions, and a quarter pound of coffee. He explains to her that beyond the forest, it is almost time for a festival, and everyone is cleaning in preparation. He went from house to house and sold his brooms at the highest prices. As father and mother celebrate, he suddenly stops and asks where the children are. Mother changes the subject to the broken jug, and after she finishes telling him the story, he laughs, then asks again after the children. She tells him that they are in the Ilsenstein forest. Suddenly scared, father tells her that the forest is where the evil Gingerbread Witch (literally, "Nibbling Witch") dwells. She lures children with cakes and sweets, pushes them into her oven, where they turn to gingerbread, and then eats them. Father and mother rush to the forest to search for their children.

=== Act 2 ===
Here there is a prelude which begins the act, called the "Witch-ride". Sometimes, the two acts are linked to each other, and the prelude is treated as an interlude.

Scene 1: In the forest. Sunset.

Gretel weaves a crown of flowers as she sings to herself. Hansel searches for strawberries. As Gretel finishes her crown, Hansel fills his basket. Gretel tries to put the crown on Hansel, but, saying that boys do not play with things like these, he puts it on her head instead. He tells her that she looks like the Queen of the Wood, and she says that if that's so, then he should give her a bouquet, too. He offers her the strawberries. They hear a cuckoo calling, and they begin to eat the strawberries. As the basket empties, they fight for the remaining strawberries, and finally, Hansel grabs the basket and dumps the leftovers in his mouth. Gretel scolds him and tells him that mother will be upset. She tries to look for more, but it is too dark for her to see. Hansel tries to find the way back, but he cannot. As the forest darkens, Hansel and Gretel become scared, and think they see something coming closer. Hansel calls out, "Who's there?" and a chorus of echoes calls back, "He's there!" Gretel calls, "Is someone there?" and the echoes reply, "There!" Hansel tries to comfort Gretel, but as a little man walks out of the forest, she screams in terror.

Scene 2

The little man turns out to be the Sandman. He calms the frightened children down by telling them that he loves them dearly, and that he has come to put them to sleep. He puts grains of sand into their eyes, and as he leaves they can barely keep their eyes open. Gretel reminds Hansel to say their evening prayer, and after they pray, they fall asleep on the forest floor.

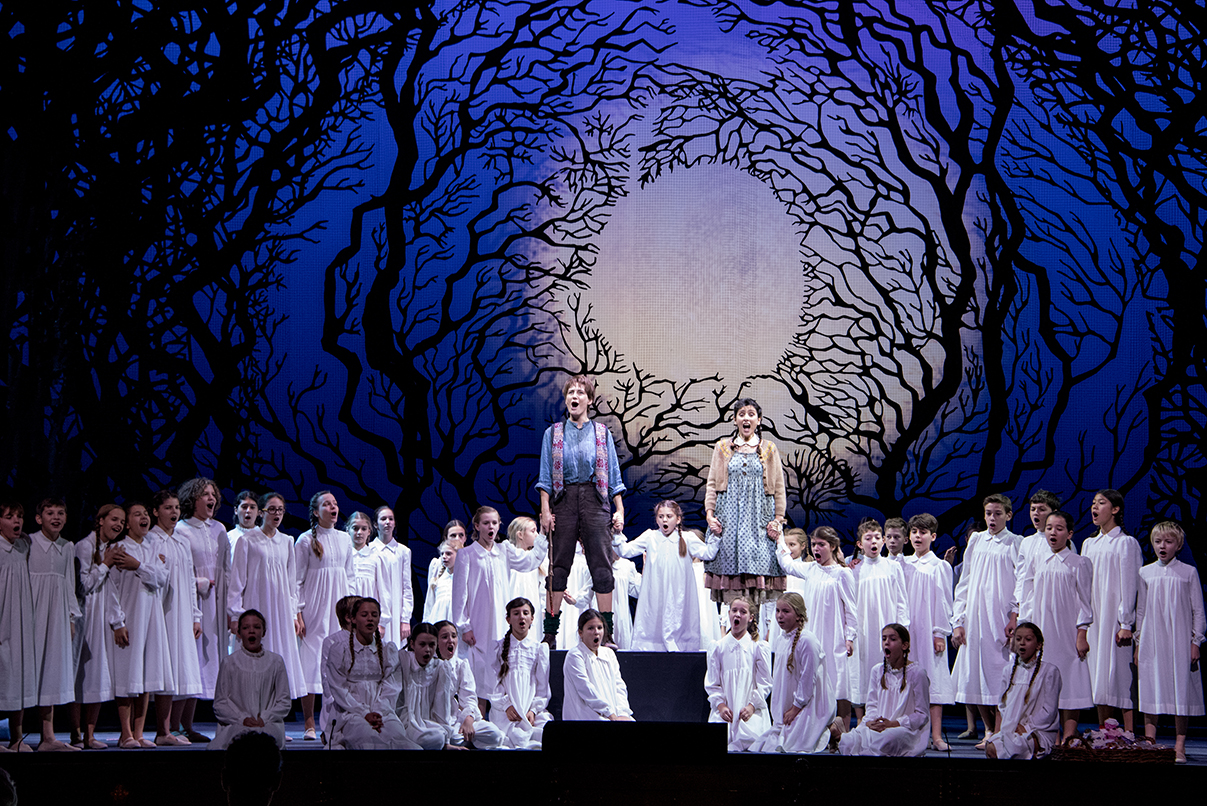
Hänsel, Gretel, angels

Scene 3

Traumpantomime [dream pantomime]. Fourteen angels come out and arrange themselves around the children to protect them as they sleep. They are presented with a gift. The forest is filled with light as the curtain falls.

=== Act 3 ===
Scene 1: In the forest.

The Dew Fairy comes to wake the children. She sprinkles dew on them, sings of how wonderful it is to be alive in the morning with the beauty of the forest surrounding her, and leaves as the children stir. Gretel wakes first, and wakes the sleepy Hansel. They tell each other of their mutual dream, of angels protecting them as they slept.

Scene 2

Suddenly they notice behind them a glorious gingerbread house. The roof is slated with cakes, the windows are of liquorice, and the walls are decorated with cookies. On the left side is an oven, on the right side is a cage, and around it is a fence of gingerbread children. Unable to resist temptation, they take a little bit of the house and nibble on it.

Scene 3

As the children nibble, a voice calls out, "Nibbling, nibbling, little mouse! Who's nibbling on my little house?" Hansel and Gretel decide that the voice must have been the wind, and they begin to eat the house. As Hansel breaks off another piece of the house, the voice again calls out, "Nibbling, nibbling, little mouse! Who's nibbling on my little house?" Hansel and Gretel ignore the voice, and continue eating. The witch comes out of the house and catches Hansel with a rope, As Hansel tries to escape, the witch explains that she is Rosine Leckermaul (literally, "Rosina Tastymuzzle"), that she likes nothing better than to feed children sweets. She tries to convince Hansel and Gretel to come into her house by offering them chocolate, tarts, marzipan, Turkish delight, lollipops, wedding cake, strawberry ice cream, blancmange, almonds, raisins, peaches and citrons but Hansel and Gretel are suspicious of the witch, so Hansel frees himself from the rope and he and Gretel begin to run away.

The witch takes out her wand and calls out, "Stop!" Hansel and Gretel are frozen to the spot where they stand. Using the wand, the witch leads Hansel to the cage. The witch leaves him stiff and slow of movement. She tells Gretel to be reasonable, and then the witch goes inside to fetch raisins and almonds with which to fatten Hansel. Hansel whispers to Gretel to pretend to obey the witch. The witch returns, and waving her wand, says, "Hocus pocus, holderbush! Loosen, rigid muscles, hush!" Using the wand, the witch forces Gretel to dance, then tells her to go into the house and set the table. Hansel pretends to be asleep, and the witch, overcome with excitement, describes how she plans to cook and eat Gretel.

The witch wakes up Hansel and has him show her his finger. He puts out a bone instead, and she feels it instead. Disappointed that he is so thin, the witch calls for Gretel to bring out raisins and almonds. As the witch tries to feed Hansel, Gretel steals the wand from the witch's pocket. Waving it towards Hansel, Gretel whispers, "Hocus pocus, holderbush! Loosen rigid muscles, hush!" As the witch turns around and wonders at the noise, Hansel discovers that he can move freely again.

The witch tells Gretel to peek inside the oven to see if the gingerbread is done. Hansel softly calls out to her to be careful. Gretel pretends that she does not know what the witch means. The witch tells her to lift herself a little bit and bend her head forward. Gretel says that she is "a goose" and doesn't understand, then asks the witch to demonstrate. The witch, frustrated, opens the oven and leans forward. Hansel springs out of the cage, and he and Gretel shove the witch into the oven. They dance. The oven begins to crackle and the flames burn fiercely, and with a loud crash it explodes.

Scene 4

Around Hansel and Gretel, the gingerbread children have turned back into humans. They are asleep and unable to move, but they sing to Hansel and Gretel, asking to be touched. Hansel is afraid, but Gretel strokes one on the cheek, and he wakes up, but is still unable to move. Hansel and Gretel touch all the children, then Hansel takes the witch's wand and, waving it, calls out the magic words, freeing the children from the spell.

Scene 5

Father is heard in the distance, calling for Hansel and Gretel. He and mother enter and embrace Hansel and Gretel. Meanwhile, the gingerbread children pull out from the ruins of the oven the witch, who has turned into gingerbread. Father gathers Hansel, Gretel and the other children around and tells them to look at this miracle. He explains that this is heaven's punishment for evil deeds and reminds them, "When the need is greatest, God the Lord puts out His hand."

== Recordings ==
=== Audio ===
- 1929: The Manchester (England) Children's Choir with the Hallé Orchestra recorded the "Evening Benediction" from Hansel and Gretel for Columbia Records on 24 June. It was the B-side to "Nymphs and Shepherds" by Henry Purcell which was a very successful record on radio in the UK for over 30 years and was awarded a Gold Disc by EMI in 1989.
- 1947: First complete recording in English by the Metropolitan Opera, starring Risë Stevens and Nadine Conner in the title roles. The album was first issued as a 78-RPM multi-record set by Columbia Masterworks Records and issued on LP a year later. It has never appeared on CD.
- 1953: A recording featuring Elisabeth Schwarzkopf and Elisabeth Grümmer, sung in German with Herbert von Karajan conducting, was issued by EMI. It is currently available on CD.
- 1953 Fritz Lehmann – (studio; mono) DG; Brilliant; Orchestra – Münchner Philharmoniker, Chorus – Knabenchor des Wittelbacher Gymnasiums München – Damen aus dem Chor des Bayerischen Rundfunks, Peter – Horst Günter, Gertrud – Marianne Schech, Hänsel – Gisela Litz, Gretel – Rita Streich, Die Knusperhexe – Res Fischer, Sandmännchen – Elisabeth Lindermeier, Taumännchen – Bruno Brückmann
- 1964: André Cluytens and the Vienna Philharmonic, in German on EMI with Irmgard Seefried as Hansel, Anneliese Rothenberger as Gretel, Elisabeth Höngen as the witch, Grace Hoffman as the mother, Walter Berry as the father, Liselotte Maikl as the Sandman/Dew man, and the Vienna Boys' Choir.
- 1969 Otmar Suitner (studio; stereo) Berlin Classics; Brilliant; Orchestra – Dresdner Staatskapelle, Chorus – Knaben des Dresdner Kreuzchors, Peter – Theo Adam, Gertrud – Gisela Schröter, Hänsel – Ingeborg Springer, Gretel – Renate Hoff, Die Knusperhexe – Peter Schreier, Sandmännchen – Renate Krahmer, Taumännchen – Renate Krahmer
- 1971: Kurt Eichhorn and the Munich Radio Orchestra recorded the work for release on Eurodisc; subsequently this recording was more widely released by RCA. Anna Moffo sang Hansel and Helen Donath was Gretel. The cast also included Dietrich Fischer-Dieskau and Christa Ludwig As the witch.
- 1974 Heinz Wallberg (studio; stereo) EMI; Orchestra – Gürzenich Orchester Köln, Chorus – Knabenchor Köln, Peter – Hermann Prey, Gertrud – Ilse Gramatzki, Hänsel – Eugen Hug, Gretel – Brigitte Lindner, Die Knusperhexe – Edda Moser, Sandmännchen – Ursula Roleff, Taumännchen – Thomas Frohn
- 1978: John Pritchard conducted the Gürzenich Orchestra Cologne for CBS Masterworks. The studio recording received mixed reviews in Gramophone and Stereo Review, mainly regarding the conducting; the cast of Frederica von Stade (Hänsel), Ileana Cotrubaș (Gretel), Christa Ludwig (Mother), Siegmund Nimsgern (Peter), and Elisabeth Söderström (Witch) was well regarded, with high praise for Kiri Te Kanawa's Little Sandman. For further details, see Hänsel und Gretel (John Pritchard recording).
- 1978: Sir Georg Solti and the Vienna Philharmonic made a studio recording for Decca Records with Lucia Popp as Gretel and Brigitte Fassbaender as Hansel. This recording also featured Walter Berry as the Father and the Vienna Boys' Choir as the gingerbread children.
- 1989: Jeffrey Tate conducting the Bavarian Radio Symphony Orchestra on EMI with Anne Sofie von Otter as Hansel and Barbara Bonney as Gretel.
- 1992: Sir Colin Davis and the Staatskapelle Dresden recorded the opera for Philips Classics with Edita Gruberová and Ann Murray as the children. Dame Gwyneth Jones portrays Gertrud.
- 1994 Donald Runnicles (studio; digital) Teldec; Orchestra – Symphonieorchester des Bayerischen Rundfunks, Chorus – Tölzer Singerknaben, Peter – Bernd Weikl, Gertrud – Hildegard Behrens, Hänsel – Jennifer Larmore, Gretel – Ruth Ziesak, Die Knusperhexe – Hanna Schwarz, Sandmännchen – Rosemary Joshua, Taumännchen – Christine Schäfer
- 1996 Paul Kantschnieder (studio; digital) RS/DARPO; Orchestra – Masurische Philharmonie, Chorus – Fuldaer Mädchenkantorei – Fuldaer Domsingknaben, Peter – Joachim Klüft, Gertrud – Esther Lee, Hänsel – Tina Hörhold, Gretel – Almut Wilker, Die Knusperhexe – Johanna Rutishauser, Sandmännchen – Martina Ramin, Taumännchen – Birgit Nath
- 2007: Sir Charles Mackerras conducted the Philharmonia Orchestra in an English-language recording for the Opera in English series on Chandos Records. This recording featured Jennifer Larmore as Hansel and Rebecca Evans as Gretel.
- 2017: Marek Janowski conducted the Rundfunk-Sinfonieorchester Berlin, with Katrin Wundsam as Hänsel and Alexandra Steiner as Gretel. It was released under Pentatone.

=== Video ===
- 1981: August Everding made a television film of the opera, which was first shown in the United States on Great Performances, and is now available on DVD. Conducted by Sir Georg Solti, the cast features Brigitte Fassbaender as Hansel, Edita Gruberová as Gretel, Sena Jurinac as the Witch (in her last role before her retirement), Hermann Prey as The Father and Helga Dernesch as The Mother.
- 1999: Live Recording from the Zurich Opera House, Alfred Muff (Peter, a broom-maker), Gabriele Lechner (Gertrud, his wife), Liliana Nikiteanu (Hänsel, his son), Malin Hartelius (Gretel, his daughter), Volker Vogel (The Witch) The Children‘s Chorus and the Orchestra of the Zurich Opera House Franz Welser-Möst (conductor) & Frank Corsaro (director). TDK DVD (Release Date: 2002) and Arthaus Musik DVD and Blu-Ray Disc (Release Date: 09/2010).
- 2008: Recorded live at the Royal Opera House, Covent Garden, London, on 12th and 16th December 2008. Angelika Kirchschlager (Hänsel), Diana Damrau (Gretel), Elizabeth Connell (Gertrude), Thomas Allen (Peter), Anja Silja (Witch), Pumeza Matshikiza (Sandman), Anita Watson (Dew-Fairy) Tiffin Boys’ Choir and Children’s Chorus & The Orchestra of the Royal Opera House, Colin Davis (conductor) & Moshe Leiser & Patrice Caurier (stage directors). Opus Arte DVD and Blu-Ray Disc (Release Date: 06/2009).

== In popular culture ==
=== Radio and screen ===
- 1931: Hansel and Gretel was the first complete Metropolitan Opera radio broadcast performance, on Christmas Day in 1931.
- 1943, 23 December: Hansel and Gretel was the first opera to be broadcast in its entirety on television, on WRGB, a local Schenectady, New York, TV station.
- 1954: The opera was made into a Technicolor film in English (Hansel and Gretel: An Opera Fantasy), with so-called "electronic" puppets (actually, a version of stop motion puppets). The screenplay was by Irish author Padraic Colum. Anna Russell provided the voice of Rosina Rubylips, the witch. Not all of the score was used; the opera was, instead, presented as a sort of operetta, with spoken dialogue between the main numbers. Baritone Frank Rogier sang the role of the father. Soprano Constance Brigham sang both Hansel and Gretel, but actress Mildred Dunnock, who did not sing her role, provided the voice of the Mother. Franz Allers conducted.
- 1970: Canadian Broadcasting Corporation produced a version of the opera directed by Norman Campbell with Maureen Forrester as the Witch.
- 1982: Again on Christmas Day, the opera was telecast live on the PBS Live from the Met series and sung once again in English. Frederica von Stade and Judith Blegen sang the title roles, with Thomas Fulton conducting. Michael Devlin sang Peter. The performance is available on DVD.
- 1998: Maurice Sendak's production of the opera, which deliberately strips away all the spectacular fantasy elements in the "Children's Prayer" scene, was shown on television’s Live from Lincoln Center, and was directed by Frank Corsaro.
- 2008: The Royal Opera House in London recorded a German-language version in association with opera DVD specialist Opus Arte, the BBC and NHK. It was directed by Moshe Leiser and Patrice Caurier and had Diana Damrau as Gretel, Angelika Kirchschlager as Hansel, Thomas Allen as Peter and Anja Silja as Witch.

For other film versions, see: Hansel and Gretel (film)

=== Literature ===
- 1949: In one chapter of Erich Kästner's children's novel The Parent Trap, Lottie Körner—while impersonating her twin sister, Luise Palfy—watches their father, Ludwig Palfy, conduct a performance of Hansel and Gretel.

== See also ==
- List of Christmas operas
