= Robert Kerns (baritone) =

American opera singer

Robert Kerns (June 8, 1933 – February 15, 1989) was an American baritone, who was born in Detroit and died in Vienna. He was a stylish and versatile singer with a wide repertoire.

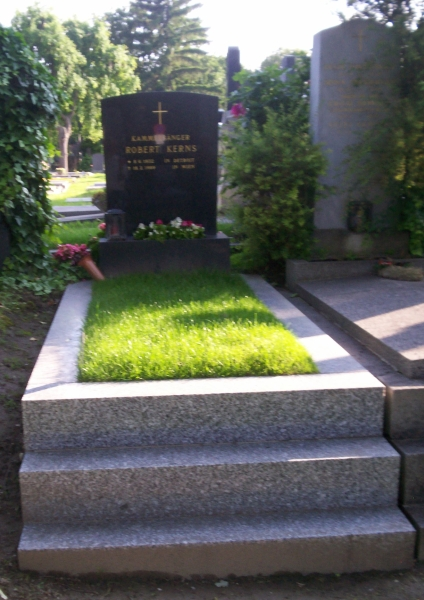
Robert Kerns' grave at the Vienna Central Cemetery.

== Life and career ==
Kerns studied at the University of Michigan, and made his debut in 1955 in Toledo, Ohio, as Sharpless in Madama Butterfly. After one year with the New York City Opera, he left for Europe in 1960, where he was engaged at the Zurich Opera where in 1961 he sang Kostandis in the world premiere of Martinů's The Greek Passion.

In 1963, he began a long association with the Vienna State Opera, and made his debut at the Royal Opera House in 1964, as Billy Budd. He made his debut at the Paris Opéra in 1973, and became the same year a permanent guest at the Deutsche Oper Berlin.

He was also a regular guest at the Aix-en-Provence Festival and the Salzburg Festival, where he sang notably; Almaviva in Le nozze di Figaro, Don Giovanni, Guglielmo in Così fan tutte, Papageno in The Magic Flute, Arlequin in Ariadne auf Naxos, as well as Figaro in Il barbiere di Siviglia, and Belcore in L'elisir d'amore.

Later he took on heavier roles such as, Germont, Posa, both Ford and Falstaff, as well as Marcello, Scarpia, and Onegin. He also included a few Wagner roles such as Wolfram, Donner, and Amfortas, in which his vocal and acting abilities were put to fine effect.

Robert Kerns made relatively few recordings, the best known being Sharpless in Madama Butterfly, opposite Mirella Freni, Luciano Pavarotti and Christa Ludwig, under Herbert von Karajan; as The King's Herald in Lohengrin (opera), opposite René Kollo, Anna Tomowa-Sintow and Siegmund Nimsgern, and as Donner in Das Rheingold under the same conductor.

== Sources ==
- Grove Music Online, Elizabeth Forbes, Oxford University Press, 2008.
