= Brother, Come and Dance with Me =

German children's song

"Brother, Come and Dance with Me" (German: Brüderchen, komm tanz mit mir) is a popular German children's song that originated in about 1800 in Thuringia.

The German composer Engelbert Humperdinck adapted the song for a duet between Hänsel and Gretel in the first act of his 1893 opera Hänsel und Gretel. The composer's sister, Adelheid Wette, modified the folk song for the opera, mainly by omitting the fifth stanza and re-arranging some lines.

== Folk song ==
Brüderchen, komm, tanz mit mir,
beide Hände reich' ich dir,
einmal hin, einmal her,
rundherum, das ist nicht schwer.

Mit den Händchen klipp, klapp, klapp,
mit den Füßchen tripp, tripp, tripp,
einmal hin, ...

Mit den Köpfchen nick, nick, nick,
mit den Fingerchen, tick, tick, tick,
einmal hin, ...

Ei, das hast du gut gemacht,
ei, das hätt' ich nicht gedacht,
einmal hin, ...

Noch einmal das schöne Spiel,
weil es mir so gut gefiel,
einmal hin, ...

Brother, come and dance with me,
both my hands I offer thee:
right foot first, left foot then,
round about and back again.

With your hands you clap, clap, clap!
With your foot you tap, tap, tap!
Right foot first, ...

With your head you nick, nick, nick!
With your fingers click, click, click!
Right foot first, ...

Well, you did that very well,
better than I thought you would.
Right foot first, ...

Let us do this game again
As it pleas'ed me so much,
right foot first, ...

The English version is sung not to the German traditional tune but to Humperdinck's melody, with a text slightly different to the above.

== Humperdinck and Wette ==
Beginning of Humperdinck's and Wette's duet:
