= Der Besuch der alten Dame (opera) =

Opera by Gottfried von Einem

- Opera by Gottfried von Einem
- Translation: The Visit of the Old Lady
- Librettist: Friedrich Dürrenmatt
- Language: German
- Based on: Dürrenmatt's 1956 play The Visit
- Premiere: 23 March 1971; Vienna State Opera

Der Besuch der alten Dame (The Visit of the Old Lady) is an opera in three acts by Gottfried von Einem to a German libretto by Friedrich Dürrenmatt, based on his 1956 play of the same name.

== Performance history ==
The work was first performed at the Vienna State Opera on 23 May 1971, with Horst Stein conducting and Christa Ludwig in the principal role. The German premiere was staged at the Deutsche Oper Berlin on 1 March 1972. Further productions followed in Strasbourg and Karl Marx Stadt in 1973, and in Stockholm in 1976. The work had its United States premiere on 25 October 1972 at the San Francisco Opera in a production directed by Francis Ford Coppola and using an English translation by Norman Tucker.

Recent productions include a run of five performances at the Görlitz Theatre, Germany, in May/June 2010.

== Roles ==
Roles, voice types, premiere cast
| Role | Voice type | Premiere cast, 23 May 1971 Conductor: Horst Stein |
|---|---|---|
| Claire Zachanassian, multi-millionairess | mezzo-soprano | Christa Ludwig |
| Her husband No. 7 | actor | Wolfgang Peschel |
| Her husband No. 9 | tenor | Elmar Brenneis |
| The butler | character tenor | Heinz Zednik |
| Toby, Roby, chewing chewing-gum | actors | Erich Trachtenberg, Klaus Peters |
| Koby, Loby, blind | tenors | Karl Terkal, Fritz Sperlbauer |
| Alfred Ill | high baritone | Eberhard Wächter |
| His wife | lyric soprano | Emmy Loose |
| His daughter | mezzo-soprano | Ana Higueras-Aragon |
| His son | tenor | Ewald Aichberger |
| The mayor | heldentenor | Hans Beirer |
| The preacher | bass-baritone | Manfred Jungwirth |
| The teacher | baritone | Hans Hotter |
| The doctor | baritone | Siegfried Rudolf Frese |
| The policeman | bass-baritone | Alois Pernerstorfer |
| First woman | soprano | Laurence Dutoit |
| Second woman | soprano | Margareta Sjöstedt |
| Hofbauer, citizen | tenor | Kurt Equiluz |
| Helmesberger, citizen | baritone | Harald Pröglhöf |
| Station master | bass-baritone | Hans Christian |
| Train driver | bass-baritone | Hans Braun |
| Conductor | tenor | Franz Machala |
| Reporter | spoken role | Wilhelm Lenninger |
| Cameraman | bass | Hans Braun |
| A voice | tenor | Julius Suchey |
Chorus: citizens of Güllen

== Recordings ==
A recording of the world premiere performance at the Vienna State Opera was released by Deutsche Grammophon on LP. This recording has been reissued on CD by Amadeo.
