= Margareta Sjöstedt =

Swedish-Austrian contralto

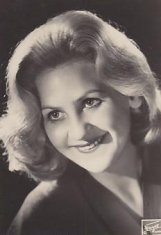
Margareta Sjöstedt

Margareta Sjöstedt, also Sjöstedt-Kraus, (1923–2012) was a Swedish-Austrian contralto who received voice training in Stockholm, Salzburg and Vienna. She gave her first lieder recital in 1951 in Stockholm. From 1955 until her retirement in 1982, she was engaged by the Vienna State Opera where she took part in over a thousand performances, appearing in parallel in lieder recitals and at the Salzburg Festivals. She was a guest singer in the opera houses of Madrid, Lisbon, Dublin and Berlin and gave recitals in Paris and London.

== Biography ==
Born in Stockholm on 17 November 1923, Margareta Sjöstedt was trained at the Royal College of Music in Stockholm (1947–1951), at the Mozarteum in Salzburg and at the Academy of Music and the Performing Arts in Vienna. Her teachers included Anita von Hillern-Dunbar, Ragnar Hultén, Elisabeth Radó and Erik Werba. While studying, she sang in Eric Ericsons Kammarkör and in the Swedish jazz group Melody Girls.

Sjöstedt gave her first lieder recital in 1951. The same year she was engaged as an opera singer by the Theater Basel and in 1955 by the Landestheater Saarbrücken. In 1956, she joined the Vienna State Opera where she remained without interruption until 1982, becoming one of the most reliable members of the ensemble. In parallel, she gave recitals of lieder and oratorios. She was a guest performer in the opera houses of Madrid, Lisbon, Dublin and Berlin, playing Dorabella in Così fan tutte and Cerubino in The Marriage of Figaro at the Deutsche Oper Berlin. She participated on three occasions at the Satzburg Festival (1958, 1964 and 1965) and at the Baroque Festival in Stockholm's Drottningholm Palace Theatre in 1966. Among her many roles were Azucena in Il trovatore, Berta in The Barber of Seville, Suzuki in Madama Butterfly, Octavia and Annina in Der Rosenkavalier, and Mercedes in Carmen. In parallel, she gave evening recitals in Vienna, Paris and London. She last performed at the Vienna Opera on 9 June 1982 as the Second lady in Gottfried von Einem's Der Besuch der alten Dame. All in all she had played 46 roles in 1,015 performances.

In 1963, she married the deputy director of Vienna's Burgtheater Heinrich Kraus (1923–2018), after which she appeared as Margareta Sjöstedt-Kraus. She died in Vienna on 14 March 2012, aged 88.

== Awards ==
For her contributions, in connection with her last performance on 9 June 1982, Margareta Sjöstedt was awarded the Austrian Cross of Honour for Science and Art, 1st class.
