= Ileana Cotrubaș =

Romanian operatic soprano (1939–2026)

Ileana Cotrubaș OSR
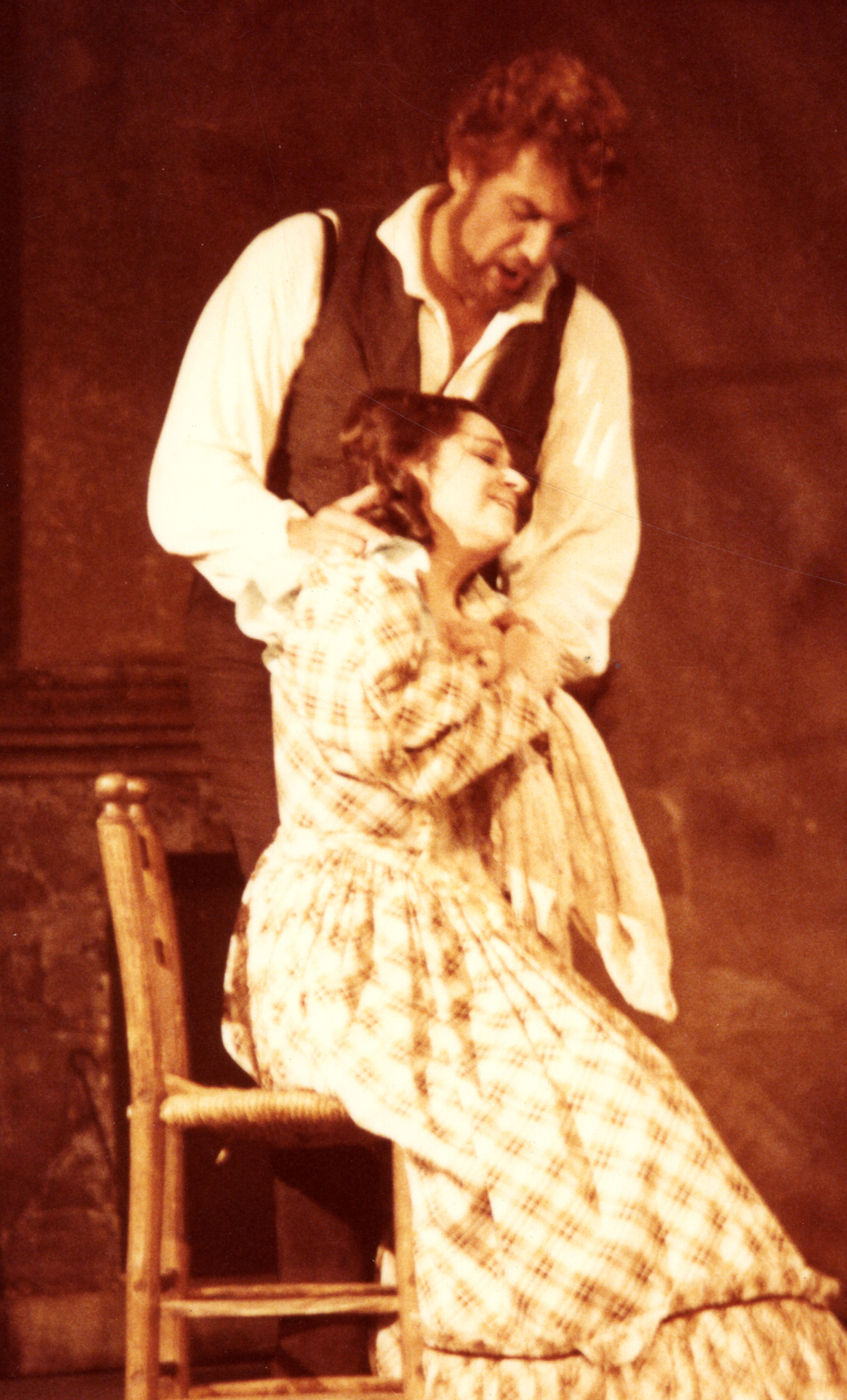
- Cotrubaș with Plácido Domingo in La bohème (1981–1982)
- Born: 9 June 1939; Galați, Covurlui County, Kingdom of Romania
- Died: 20 August 2026 (aged 87); Vienna, Austria
- Education: Ciprian Porumbescu Conservatory, Bucharest
- Occupation: Operatic soprano
- Years active: 1964–1990
- Organizations: Vienna State Opera
- Title: Kammersängerin
- Spouse: Manfred Ramin (m. 1972)

Signature
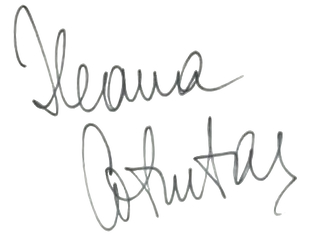

Ileana Cotrubaș (Romanian: [iˈle̯ana kotruˈbaʃ]; 9 June 1939 – 20 August 2026) was a Romanian operatic soprano. After winning the 1966 ARD International Music Competition in Munich, she made an international career at the major opera houses, a member of the Vienna State Opera from 1970. She made an international breakthrough on 7 January 1975, stepping in for Mirella Freni at La Scala in Milan as Mimì in Puccini's La bohème. Regarded by many as the best Mimì and Traviata of her time, she retired from public singing in 1990. She gave master classes from the late 1970s, and in retirement focused on coaching promising young singers.

Cotrubaș was critical of the dominance of directors in opera, sometimes walking out of productions. She published a 1998 autobiography entitled Opernwahrheiten (Opera truths), and, together with her husband, in 2017, Die manipulierte Oper (The manipulated opera).

Her voice was described as light and bright with a fragile timbre; Mozart roles formed a core of her repertoire. Vivien Schweitzer wrote in her New York Times obituary that Cotrubaș was able to convey the pathos of operatic heroines with her tender, pure, expressive tone. The Vienna State Opera, her artistic home, remembered that she did not seek "outward, polished perfection", but truth in both singing and acting, and that she was able, by nuanced coloring of her voice, to give individual phrases character and an "audible and palpable passion".

== Life and career ==
Cotrubaș was born in Galați on 9 June 1939. Her father worked as a civil servant in the ministry of agriculture. He was also a tenor in an amateur choir. He and her mother, Maria, were amateur opera singers. Cotrubaș became a member of a children's radio choir at age nine, where she participated in operas such as Puccini's La bohème and Tosca, Bizet's Carmen and Mussorgsky's Boris Godunov. In 1952, the family moved to Bucharest where she attended the Școala Specială de Muzică – a school for the musically gifted. At the Bucharest Conservatory, she studied for five years; in addition to voice, which she studied with Constantin Stroescu and Emanuel Elenescu, she took classes in piano, violin, accordion, and choral conducting.

=== Early career ===
Cotrubaș made her stage debut with the Bucharest Opera as the boy Yniold in Debussy's Pelléas et Mélisande in 1964 during her studies. She subsequently expanded her repertory to include trouser roles such as Siebel in Gounod's Faust, Oscar in Verdi's Un ballo in maschera, and Cherubino in Mozart's Le nozze di Figaro, then also Blonde in Mozart's Die Entführung aus dem Serail and Gilda in Verdi's Rigoletto.

In 1964 Cotrubaș was awarded the Enescu Prize in Bucharest. In 1965 she won first prize in opera, lieder, and oratorio at the International Vocal Competition 's-Hertogenbosch in the Netherlands. The following year, she won the ARD International Music Competition in Munich. She then continued her studies in Vienna and in 1967 she was successful at La Monnaie in Brussels in Mozart roles, Konstanze in Die Entführung aus dem Serail and Pamina in Die Zauberflöte. She performed at the Salzburg Festival as the Second Boy in Die Zauberflöte that year in a new production directed by Oscar Fritz Schuh and conducted by Wolfgang Sawallisch. The prizes and successes led to appearances in the Hamburg State Opera and the Berlin State Opera. Cotrubaș became a member of the ensemble of the Oper Frankfurt in 1968, engaged by Christoph von Dohnányi. One of her roles there was Mélisande in Pelléas et Mélisande.

In 1969 Cotrubaș first performed in the United Kingdom at the Glyndebourne Festival again as Mélisande. John Pritchard, the conductor, had seen her in Frankfurt and brought her to Glyndebourne. Her performance, alongside Peter-Christoph Runge and Jacques Mars, won her international recognition. She returned to Glyndebourne the following two seasons for the title role of Cavalli's La Calisto.

=== Vienna State Opera ===
Cotrubaș made her debut at the Vienna State Opera in 1969 as Pamina in Die Zauberflöte. Cotrubaș signed a three-year contract with the Vienna State Opera in 1970. During her time there, she learned the Mozart roles of Susanna in Le nozze di Figaro and Zerlina in Don Giovanni, Violetta, the title role in Verdi's La traviata, Mimì in La bohème, Nedda in Leoncavallo's Pagliacci, and Sophie in Der Rosenkavalier by Richard Strauss. Her roles in Vienna also included Pamina, Gilda, Micaëla in Carmen, Tatyana in Eugene Onegin, Adina in Donizetti's L'elisir d'amore, Amelia in Verdi's Simon Boccanegra and Charlotte in Massenet's Werther.

=== International appearances ===
Cotrubaș made her début at the Royal Opera House in London in 1971 as Tatyana in Tchaikovsky's Eugene Onegin. She performed there regularly, in roles including Susanna, Norina in Donizetti's Don Pasquale, Traviata, Mélisande, Pamina, Mimi, Adina in L'elisir d'amore, Antonia in Offenbach's The Tales of Hoffmann, Amina in Bellini's La sonnambula, and later Verdi roles, Elisabetta in Don Carlo and Alice Ford in Falstaff.

In 1973, she first performed in the United States, at the Lyric Opera of Chicago as Mimì, and returned to perform as Norina in Don Pasquale, Euridice in Gluck's Orfeo ed Euridice, Traviata and Gilda. At Glyndebourne she appeared in 1973 as Susanna alongside the Figaro of Knut Skram, directed by Peter Hall and conducted by Pritchard. At the Paris Opera she portrayed Massenet's Manon in 1974.

Cotrubaș's international breakthrough came on 7 January 1975, when she replaced Mirella Freni at La Scala in Milan as Mimì on short notice, at the suggestion of Luciano Pavarotti. After a rushed and difficult journey from her home in Kent, she arrived just 15 minutes before curtain time. Her interpretation, "intimate, tender and vocally refined", was acclaimed by critics and audiences alike. The following year, she portrayed the title role of La traviata at the Bavarian State Opera, alongside Plácido Domingo as Rodolfo and conducted by Carlos Kleiber. She was impressed by working with Kleiber who she stated made her go to her limits.

Cotrubaș made her debut at the Metropolitan Opera (Met) on 23 March 1977, as Mimì in a production with José Carreras and Renata Scotto. While with the Met, she appeared as Gilda, alongside Domingo and Cornell MacNeil, in a televised performance of Rigoletto on 7 November 1977. She portrayed Traviata again, with Domingo and MacNeil, televised on 28 March 1981. Donal Henahan from the New York Times named the production a "pure triumph" and detailed: "From the first puzzled and tentative notes of 'e strano' straight through to the almost delirious brilliance of 'sempre libera' she drew one long, unerring curve of vocal and dramatic excitement." She sang three other roles at the Met: Ilia in Mozart's Idomeneo, with Pavarotti in the title role in the opera's Metropolitan Opera premiere which was filmed, Tatyana, and Micaëla, the role of her final performance with the company on 26 March 1987.

Cotrubaș appeared as Mimì at the Teatro de la Zarzuela in Madrid in 1980. In 1981 she appeared at Glyndebourne as Tytania in Britten's A Midsummer Night's Dream, conducted by Bernard Haitink and again staged by Peter Hall. She performed as Ninetta in Rossini's La gazza ladra at the Cologne Opera in 1984.

Cotrubaș performed at the Liceu in Barcelona as Mimì in 1982, as Susanna in 1984, as Nedda in 1987 and as Desdemona in Verdi's Otello in 1988. In more Verdi roles, she appeared at the Teatro San Carlo in Naples as Amelia in Simon Boccanegra in 1986, and at the Opéra de Monte-Carlo as Alice Ford in Falstaff in 1988. She later described taking on heavier roles such as Nedda, Descdemona and Elisabetta as "flirting" with them, knowing that her voice was not ideal for them. In his obituary for The Guardian, Barry Millington noted: "Her considerable strengths lay rather in her ability to shape phrases, to spin a legato line and above all to invest her characterisations with psychological acuity and compelling dramatic force."

Cotrubaș portrayed Mélisande at the Maggio Musicale Fiorentino in 1989. She announced her retirement from the stage in October of that same year, and, after a series of farewell concerts, officially retired in 1990.

=== Criticism of Regietheater ===
Cotrubaș was known for being very demanding not only of herself but also of directors and colleagues. While she praised directors such as Peter Hall, with whom she often worked in England, Otto Schenk, Günther Rennert, Jean-Pierre Ponnelle, and Giorgio Strehler, she was critical of any stage director who "doesn't love music and doesn't trust it", admitting that she was conservative. Demanding artistic independence, she walked out of productions twice when she was not able to accept the stage director's view, first in Eugene Onegin in Vienna in 1973 and again in 1980 for Don Pasquale at the Met. The following year she left a production of La traviata by John Dexter, returning when Colin Graham became its director. In 1984, for La bohème at the Met, she refused to perform the final performance due to disagreements with the conductor, stating that she was unwilling to "prostitute" herself "for the money". She informed the press prior to informing the Met. In 1987 she used the curtain call after the first act of La traviata for an apology for appearing in a production she thought was unacceptable.

In retirement, she published a 1998 autobiography entitled Opernwahrheiten (Opera truths), in German with the help of her German husband. It revealed her criticism of the opera business, especially of Regietheater. She wrote about directors who absolutely wanted to create something innovative but ignored the score, conductors who went along with them but avoided looking at the stage, and ignorant politicians who supported the development. She expressed her fear that young people had no chance to get to know operas, but only directors' interpretation of them.

Together with her husband, Manfred Ramin, she published a polemic book in 2017, Die manipulierte Oper (The manipulated opera). They wrote about Regietheater in a wider context than in her first book, addressing opera managers, journalists and cultural politicians, using many examples of directors' ideas they found laughable and distorting the operas.

=== Concert and recital ===
Cotrubaș sang the first soprano in Mozart's Great Mass in C minor at the Salzburg Festival in 1968, conducted by Bernhard Paumgartner. She performed in vocal symphonic works such as Mozart's Requiem and Schumann's Scenes from Goethe's Faust. She sang and recorded Bach cantatas, Haydn’s Die Jahreszeiten, Ein deutsches Requiem by Brahms, and solos in Mahler's Second and Eighths Symphonies.

For her first recital of art songa at Carnegie Hall in New York City on 7 December 1977, with pianist Martin Isepp, she selected lieder by Schubert and Brahms, mélodies by Fauré and songs by Britten. She gave a recital at the Salzburg Festival with pianist Erik Werba on 14 August 1978 with a similar program. Cotrubaș sang and recorded Hugo Wolf's Italienisches Liederbuch. She gave recitals in the Musikverein in Vienna, in Paris, Munich and Zürich, among others.

=== Teaching ===
Cotrubaș began giving master classes in the United States in the late 1970s and then took them to other countries. After retiring from the stage, she focused on teaching and coaching young singers, including Elena Tsallagova. In Spain, she taught at the Reina Sofía School of Music in Madrid in 1999, at San Sebastián in 2003 and at the Escuela Superior de Canto in Madrid in 2013.

Cotrubaș told her students that they had to present a character with the first note, which meant that they had to understand the work, the character's position in it and its language, to be able to define the character in posture, movement and voice. She coached the Uruguayan soprano María José Siri for a day in 2002, after she had failed the first round of a competition in Andorra, and later gave her lessons in her home for years, transforming her technique and making her find her own voice. The French mezzo-soprano Gaëlle Arquez remembered:

She was a woman of rare intensity. Her words could be scathing, her judgement relentless and her demands formidable. She demanded truth, commitment and absolute honesty; demands that are not always easy to meet, but which are perhaps indispensable for anyone who wishes to become more than just a performer. She taught me – sometimes with a firmness that left no room for hiding – to forge the armour necessary for this demanding profession, whilst never allowing that armour to harden the very essence of an artist. For behind that impressive strength lay a deeply endearing heart and immense sensitivity. She knew that a voice is not merely a medium to be shaped: it must be lived. She nurtured the imagination, poetry, vulnerability and that boundless inner world from which true song is born.

=== Personal life ===
From 1972, Cotrubaș was married to Manfred Ramin, a conductor and critic from Berlin. The couple had no children, arguing that their travelling lifestyle would not have provided children the stability in family and education they need. They first lived in Sevenoaks in Kent, and later moved to Vienna.

Cotrubaș died in Vienna on 20 August 2026 at the age of 87. A black flag was flown by the Vienna State Opera as a sign of mourning. Millington summarised that she "incarnated" the "often wounded women she played", "combining inner strength with a touching vulnerability". He noted especially about her Traviata, that she "encompassed the character's frailty, her zest for life, her exuberance and her inescapably tragic situation, in performances that were throbbing with passion and almost unbearably intense".

== Awards ==
- 1981 Kammersängerin
- 1991 Honorary membership Vienna State Opera
- 2000 Order of the Star of Romania
- 2023 Österreichischer Musiktheaterpreis for her life's work

== Recordings ==
Cotrubaș made many recordings, mostly in opera, including films of productions such as the live broadcasts from the Metropolitan opera. She made a few recordings of recital programs. Jan Brachmann, writing for the Frankfurter Allgemeine Zeitung, noted that the nuances of her singing showed better on recordings than in performances.

- 1969 Mozart: Bastien und Bastienne – Cotrubaș (as Bastienne) with Thomas Lehrberger (Bastien), Peter van der Bilt (Colas), Mozarteum Orchestra Salzburg , Leopold Hager, conductor, live from Salzburg Festival, Orfeo, OCLC 76876380
- 1971 Francesco Cavalli: La Calisto – Cotrubaș (as Calisto) with Janet Baker, London Philharmonic Orchestra, Raymond Leppard, conductor, from Glyndebourne. Decca OCLC 162244310
- 1971 Mahler: Symphony No. 8 – Cotrubaș with Royal Concertgebouw Orchestra, Bernard Haitink, conductor. Pentatone
- 1974 Mozart: Così fan tutte – Cotrubaș (as Despina), Royal Opera House, Colin Davis, conductor, Phillips OCLC 855873131
- 1974 Mozart: Great Mass in C minor – Cotrubaș, with Kiri Te Kanawa, Werner Krenn, Hans Sotin, John Alldis Choir, New Philharmonia Orchestra, Raymond Leppard, conductor. CDC
- 1974 Verdi: La traviata – Cotrubaș with José Carreras, Victor Braun, John Pritchard, conductor. SKU
- 1975 Mahler: Symphony No. 2 – Cotrubaș with Christa Ludwig, Vienna State Opera Chorus, Vienna Philharmonic, Zubin Mehta, conductor.
- 1976 Haydn: La fedeltà premiata (Antal Doráti recording) (as Nerina), Phillips OCLC 2678328
- 1976 Puccini: Il trittico – Cotrubaș (as Suor Genovieffa in Suor Angelica and as Lauretta in Gianni Schicchi) with Ingvar Wixell, Renata Scotto, Marilyn Horne, Tito Gobbi, New Philharmonia Orchestra, Lorin Maazel, conductor, Sony OCLC 7246573
- 1976 Charpentier: Louise – Cotrubaș with Plácido Domingo, Gabriel Bacquier and Jane Berbié, New Philharmonia Orchestra and Ambrosian Opera Chorus, Georges Prêtre, conductor, Sony Masterworks, 2009 OCLC 1184400847
- 1977 Donizetti: L'elisir d'amore – Cotrubaș (as Adina) with Plácido Domingo, Geraint Evans, Ingvar Wixell, Lillian Watson, Royal Opera House Orchestra, John Pritchard, conductor, CBS OCLC 941808439
- 1977 Verdi: La traviata – Cotrubaș with Plácido Domingo and Sherrill Milnes, Carlos Kleiber, conductor, studio recording. Deutsche Grammophon OCLC 780989469
- 1977 Handel: Rinaldo – Cotrubaș (as Almirena), La Grande Écurie et la Chambre du Roy, Jean-Claude Malgoire, conductor, Sony OCLC 37566200
- 1977 Mozart: Le nozze di Figaro – Cotrubaș (as Susanna) with Anna Tomowa-Sintow, Tom Krause, José van Dam, Frederica von Stade, Vienna Philharmonic, from the Salzburg Festival, directed by Jean-Pierre Ponnelle, Herbert von Karajan, conductor. Decca OCLC 967729121
- 1977 Verdi: Rigoletto – Cotrubaș (as Gilda) with placido Domingo and Cornell MacNeil, live from the Metropolitan Opera, James Levine, conductor. DVD Deutsche Grammophon OCLC 56362680
- 1977 Schubert: Rosamunde – Cotrubaș, with Rundfunkchor Leipzig, Staatskapelle Dresden, Willi Boskowsky, conductor. Eterna
- 1978 Bizet: Les pêcheurs de perles – Cotrubaș (as Leila), Alain Vanzo (Nadir), Guillermo Sarabia (Zurga), Roger Soyer (Nourabad), Paris Opera Orchestra and chorus, Georges Prêtre, conductor. Audio CD: EMI Cat: 367702-2, 2002 OCLC 839876946
- 1978 Lieder, songs by Schubert, Britten, Fauré, Brahms, Duparc, Debussy and Mihai Brediceanu – Cotrubaș with pianist Erik Werba, from Salzburg Festival.
- 1979 Mozart: Le nozze di Figaro (Herbert von Karajan recording) (as Susanna) OCLC 999812103
- 1979 Puccini: La bohème – Cotrubaș with Luciano Pavarotti and Piero Cappuccilli, Carlos Kleiber, conductor, live recording at La Scala, Milan, 22 March 1979. EX92T01/2 CD OCLC 1025246356
- 1979 Berlioz: Béatrice et Bénédict – Cotrubaș (as Héro) with Yvonne Minton, Plácido Domingo, Nadine Denize, Roger Soyer, Dietrich Fischer-Dieskau, John Macurdy, Daniel Barenboim conducting the Chœur et Orchestre de Paris.
- 1979 Humperdinck: Hänsel und Gretel (John Pritchard recording) – Cotrubaș (as Gretel) with Frederica von Stade, and Christa Ludwig, Gürzenich Orchestra Cologne, John Pritchard, conductor, Sony, OCLC 28326721
- 1979 Verdi: Rigoletto – Cotrubaș (as Gilda) with Plácido Domingo and Piero Cappuccilli, Vienna Philharmonic, conducted by Carlo Maria Giulini, studio recording, Deutsche Grammophon, Cat: STEREO 4152888-2 OCLC 987619877
- 1977 Puccini: La bohème – Cotrubaș (as Mimi) with Giacomo Aragall, Orchestra of the Royal Opera House, live, Carlos Kleiber.
- 1980 Debussy: Pelléas et Mélisande – Cotrubaș (as Mélisande), with Jorma Hynninen, Gabriel Bacquier, from Paris, Lorin Maazel, conductor. DVD SKU
- 1980 Donizetti: L'elisir d'amore – Cotrubaș (as Adina) with Peter Dvorsky, Giuseppe Taddei, Jesus Lopez-Cobos, conductor. SKU
- 1980 Mozart: Die Entführung aus dem Serail – Cotrubaș (as Konstanze), with Peter Schreier, Martti Talvela, Vienna Philharmonic, Lorin Maazel, conductor, from the Salzburg Festival. SKU
- 1981 Bellini: La sonnambula – Cotrubaș (as Amina), with Dennis O’Neill, Manfred Ramin, conductor.
- 1982 Mozart: Idomeneo (Jean-Pierre Ponnelle film) (as Ilia) (DVD)
- 1983 The Metropolitan Opera Centennial Gala (DVD) OCLC 462117640
- 1983 Massenet: Manon – Cotrubaș with Alfredo Kraus, Choeurs et Orchestre du Capitole de Toulouse, Michel Plasson, conductor, EMI OCLC 1385330619
- 1983 Schumann: Scenes from Goethe's Faust – Cotrubaș (as Gretchen), with Bernd Weikl, Theo Adam, Peter Schreier, Wolfgang Sawallisch, conductor. SKU
- 1984 Hugo Wolf: Italienisches Liederbuch, with pianist Geoffrey Parsons, live at Covent Garden. Chandos. OCLC 906562998
- 1985 Leoncavallo: Pagliacci – Cotrubaș (as Nedda) with Plácido Domingo, Wolfgang Schöne, from Vienna State Opera, Ádám Fischer, conductor. Orfeo
- 1986 Gluck: Paride ed Elena – Cotrubaș (as Elena), Franco Bonisolli, Vienna Radio Symphony Orchestra, Lothar Zagrosek, conductor, Orfeo OCLC 966319221
- 1987 Bizet: Carmen – Cotrubaș (as Micaëla) with Teresa Berganza, Plácido Domingo, Sherrill Milnes, London Symphony Orchestra, Claudio Abbado, conductor, Deutsche Grammophon, OCLC 966319637
- 1987 Mozart: Requiem – Cotrubaș, with Helen Watts, Robert Tear, John Shirley-Quirk, Academy & Chorus of St Martin in the Fields, Neville Marriner, conductor. Decca OCLC 906159374
- 1996 James Levine's 25th Anniversary Metropolitan Opera Gala (DVD) OCLC 63762786

== Bibliography ==
- Ileana Cotrubaș: Opernwahrheiten, Vienna: Holzhausen Verlag, 1998. ISBN 978-3-85493-005-1
- Ileana Cotrubas, Manfred Ramin: Die manipulierte Oper, Vienna: Verlag Der Apfel, 2017. ISBN 978-3-85450-118-3
