= Adelheid Wette =

German author

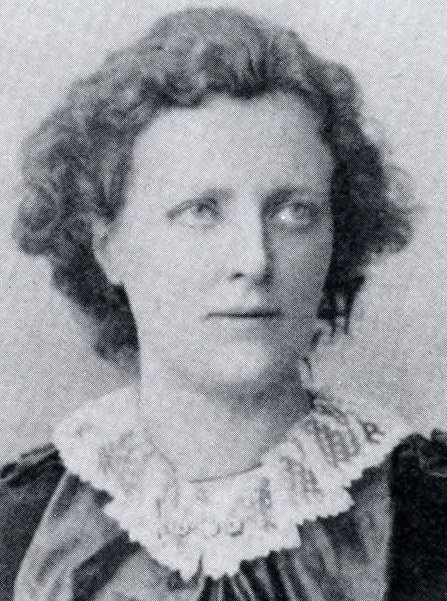
Adelheid Wette

Adelheid Catharina Maria Humperdinck Wette (4 September 1858 – 9 August 1916) was a German author, composer and folklorist who is best remembered today as the librettist of her brother Engelbert Humperdinck's opera Hansel and Gretel.

== Life and career ==
Wette was born in Siegburg, Kingdom of Prussia, the youngest sister of the composer Engelbert Humperdinck. Her parents were Gustav Humperdinck, a high school teacher, and Gertrud Hartmann Humperdinck, the daughter of a cantor. Adelheid was very interested in reading folktales and writing poetry. In 1881, she married Dr. Hermann Wette who shared her interest in folktales and had himself written two libretti for the composer Arnold Mendelssohn.

Every year, Adelheid Wette wrote a play for her children to perform at a family celebration. In 1888, she wrote the libretto to Engelbert's singspiel Snow White.

In 1890, Adelheid wrote a version of Hansel and Gretel to be performed for her husband's birthday in May. In a letter to Engelbert in April, she asked him to compose music for five of her verses to use in the play: a cock-a-doodle-doo song (Lied); a dance song (Tanzlied); an echo song (Echolied); a forest song (Waldlied); and a lullaby (Schlummerlied). She included rhythmic suggestions for the dance song and suggested a melody of the lullaby. Engelbert responded with an arrangement of songs for two voices and piano. When he adapted the folk song "Brother Come and Dance with Me" for a duet between Hänsel and Gretel in the first act, Adelheid modified the song by omitting the fifth stanza and re-arranging some lines. Over the next two years, with Adelheid and Hermann Wette's assistance, Engelbert expanded Hansel and Gretel into a fully scored opera which premiered in Weimar, Germany, on 23 December 1893, and remains his best-known composition.

Wette's works include:

== Stage works ==
- Frog King (1896)
- Hansel and Gretel (libretto); in English: Hänsel and Gretel: a fairy opera adapted from the libretto, translated Norreys J. O’Conor, illustrated by M. L. Kirk (New York: Frederick A. Stokes Co., 1909)
- Snow White and the Seven Dwarves (libretto)

== Poetry ==
- "Abends will ich schlafen gehn" [In the Evening, I Will Go to Sleep]

== Songs ==
- Deutsches Kinderliederbuch [German Children's Songbook] (1903)
