= Siegmund Nimsgern =

German bass-baritone (1940–2025)

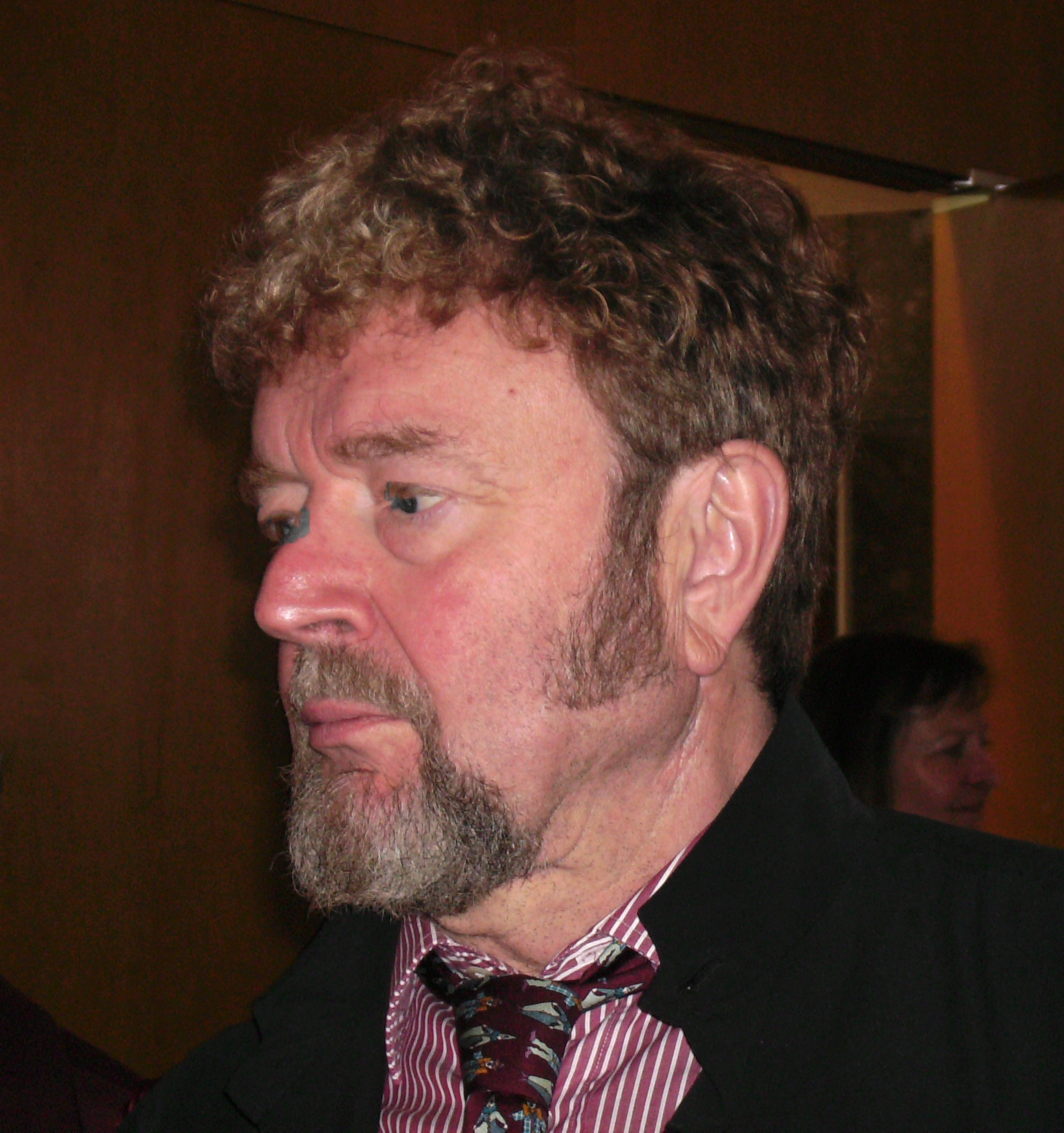
- Nimsgern in 2007
- Born: 14 January 1940; Sankt Wendel, Saarland, Germany
- Died: 14 September 2025 (aged 85); Sankt Ingbert, Saarland, Germany
- Education: University of Saarbrücken; Hochschule für Musik Saar
- Occupation: Operatic baritone

Siegmund Nimsgern (14 January 1940 – 14 September 2025) was a German bass-baritone who made an international career. His signature roles were "evil, dark, ambiguous figures" such as Pizarro in Beethoven's Fidelio and Telramund in Wagner's Lohengrin. Other dark roles he performed include Kaspar in Weber's Der Freischütz, Ruthven in Marschner's Der Vampyr, Klingsor in Wagner's Parsifal, Scarpia in Puccini's Tosca, Bartók's Bluebeard and Hindemith's Cardillac. He performed at La Scala in Milan and the Metropolitan Opera in New York, and portrayed Wotan in Wagner's Der Ring des Nibelungen at the Bayreuth Festival from 1983 to 1986. He was also known for performing works by Bach in concert and in recordings, including cantata cycles and major works with Nikolaus Harnoncourt and Helmuth Rilling. He recorded Schoenberg's Die Jakobsleiter and Gurre-Lieder conducted by Pierre Boulez and took part in a 1989 recording of Lohengrin that won a Grammy Award.

== Life and career ==
Nimsgern was born in Sankt Wendel, Saarland, on 14 January 1940. As a boy he had a soprano voice. After completing school in Saarbrücken in 1960 he studied musicology, German and philosophy at the University of Saarbrücken. He studied voice and musical education at the Hochschule für Musik Saar with Sibylle Fuchs, Jakob Stämpfli and Paul Lohmann. He won the 1965 International Vocal Competition 's-Hertogenbosch and the 1967 Mendelssohn Competition in Berlin.

Nimsgern made his debut at the Saarländisches Staatstheater in Saarbrücken in 1967 as Lionel in Tchaikovsky's The Maid of Orleans. In 1971, he went to the Deutsche Oper am Rhein in Düsseldorf and Duisburg for three years. One of his early successes was Escamillo in Bizet's Carmen.

He appeared internationally from 1973, first at the Royal Opera House in London as Amfortas in Wagner's Parsifal in 1973. He performed the role also at the Paris Opéra in 1974, Kreon in Stravinsky's Oedipus rex in 1979, and later both Telramund in Wagner's Lohengrin and Pizarro in Beethoven's Fidelio, which became two signature roles. He used "differentiated vocal gestures" and articulation of the language to portray "evil, dark, ambiguous figures" including also Ruthven in Marschner's Der Vampyr, Klingsor in Parsifal, and the title roles in Bartók's Bluebeard's Castle and Hindemith's Cardillac. Nimsgern performed at La Scala in Milan, at the Orange Festival from 1976 to 1979 and in 1989, and at the Arena di Verona in 1980. He performed at the 1989 Ludwigsburg Festival as Kaspar in Weber's Der Freischütz and at the Vienna State Opera as Dr. Vigelius in Schreker's Der ferne Klang. In 1993 he appeared as Altair in Die ägyptische Helena by R. Strauss at the Megaron hall in Athens.

Nimsgern made his debut at the Metropolitan Opera in New York as Pizarro, returning for Jochanaan in Salome by R. Strauss. He performed at the Opéra de Montréal and the San Francisco Opera. When he appeared as Scarpia in Puccini's Tosca at the Lyric Opera of Chicago, he interpreted him as the foreboding of a fascist sadist; his interpretation was hailed as the best Scarpia since Tito Gobbi.

From 1983 to 1986, Nimsgern portrayed Wotan in Wagner's Der Ring des Nibelungen at the Bayreuth Festival, conducted by Georg Solti and directed by Peter Hall. He appeared as Alberich in the Ring cycle recorded by Marek Janowski, portraying the character "with pale colours of defiance and rage" and expressive language.

He recorded numerous operas including Der Vampyr, Weinberger's Schwanda the Bagpiper, Flotow's Martha, Pergolesi's La serva padrona, and Wagner's Parsifal. He appeared as Kurwenal in a 1978 live recording of Wagner's Tristan und Isolde at La Scala conducted by Carlos Kleiber, alongside Spas Wenkoff and Catarina Ligendza in the title roles. He recorded Humperdinck's Hänsel und Gretel, conducted by John Pritchard. He took part in a 1989 recording of Wagner's Lohengrin, conducted by Solti with Plácido Domingo in the title role and Jessye Norman as Elsa, that won a Grammy Award.

From the beginning, Nimsgern focused on singing in concert, especially in works by Johann Sebastian Bach that he performed with leading conductors in Europe and the United States. He took part in recordings of Bach cantata cycles and major works such as the Mass in B minor and the Christmas Oratorio with Nikolaus Harnoncourt and Helmuth Rilling. He recorded Schoenberg's Die Jakobsleiter in the role of Gabriel, conducted by Pierre Boulez in 1982.

Nimsgern taught voice as a guest professor at the Hochschule für Musik Saar and at the Mozarteum in Salzburg.

=== Personal life ===
Nimsgern lived with his family in Sankt Ingbert, Saarland. He and his wife Mechthild had a son, the musical theatre composer Frank Nimsgern.

Nimsgern died in Sankt Ingbert on 14 September 2025, at the age of 85.

== Writings ==
- Nimsgern, Siegmund; Strahler, Elisabeth (2007). Rampenfieber : Stimmlippenbekenntnisse (in German). St. Ingbert: Wassermann Verl. ISBN 978-3-928030-65-6. OCLC 985545884.

== Discography ==
- Bach: Cantatas, Concentus Musicus Wien, Nikolaus Harnoncourt, Telefunken, 1960 OCLC 873139116
- Bach: Sacred Works, Münchener Bach-Orchester, Karl Richter, Deutsche Grammophon, 1965 OCLC 1031705331
- Bruckner: Psalm 146, Hans-Sachs-Chor Nürnberg, Nürnberger Symphoniker, Wolfgang Riedelbauch, Colosseum, 1972 OCLC 473299643
- Telemann: Pimpinone oder Die ungleiche Heyrath, Ensemble Florilegium Musicumm, Hans Ludwig Hirsch, Teldec, 1975 OCLC 985604809
- Bach: Les Grandes cantates : Cantates BWV 41, 48, 69, 96, 113, 120, 125, 146, 156, Gächinger Kantorei, Bach-Collegium Stuttgart, Rilling, Costallat, 1975 OCLC 761564425
- Schoenberg: Gurre-Lieder, London Philharmonic Orchestra, Pierre Boulez, Sony, 1975 OCLC 1200236566
- Bach: Mass in B minor, Gächinger Kantorei, Bach-Collegium Stuttgart, Helmuth Rilling, Naxos, 1977 OCLC 1467014579
- Wagner: Tristan und Isolde, choir and orchestra of La Scala, Carlos Kleiber, MYTO Records, live 1978 OCLC 45261354
- Wagner: Parsifal, Herbert von Karajan, Deutsche Grammophon, 1981 OCLC 978578344
- Schoenberg: Die Jakobsleiter, Mady Mesplé, Ortrun Wenkel, John Shirley-Quirk and others, BBC Singers, BBC Symphony Orchestra, Pierre Boulez, CBS, 1982.
- Beethoven: Fidelio, with Jeannine Altmeyer in the title role and Siegfried Jerusalem as Florestan, MDR Chor, Gewandhausorchester, Kurt Masur, CBS, 1982.
- Simon, Hans: Siegmund Nimsgern singt Hans Simon, Rundfunk-Sinfonieorchester Saarbrücken, Siegfried Köhler, CBS, 1983 OCLC 916380846
- Wagner: Der Ring des Nibelungen, Staatskapelle Dresden, Marek Janowski, Sony, 1983
- Blacher, Boris: Der Großinquisitor, Leipzig Radio Chorus, Dresden Philharmonic, Herbert Kegel, Naxos, 1986 OCLC 913824269
- Wagner: Lohengrin, Vienna Philharmonic, Georg Solti, 1986 OCLC 52233905
- Humperdinck: Hänsel und Gretel, Gürzenich Orchestra, John Pritchard, CBS, 1989
- Mahler: Symphony No. 8, Vienna Philharmonic, Lorin Maazel, Sony, 1989 OCLC 1023589556
- Pflüger: Liederzyklen, Bayer Records OCLC 1527809684
- Pflüger, Hans Georg: Memento mori, Capella Cracoviensis, Roland Bader, Cadenza, 1995
- Stephan: Die ersten Menschen, Berlin Radio Symphony Orchestra, Karl Anton Rickenbacher, CPO, 1998 (2006) OCLC 1057122951
