= Engelbert Humperdinck (composer) =

German composer (1854–1921)

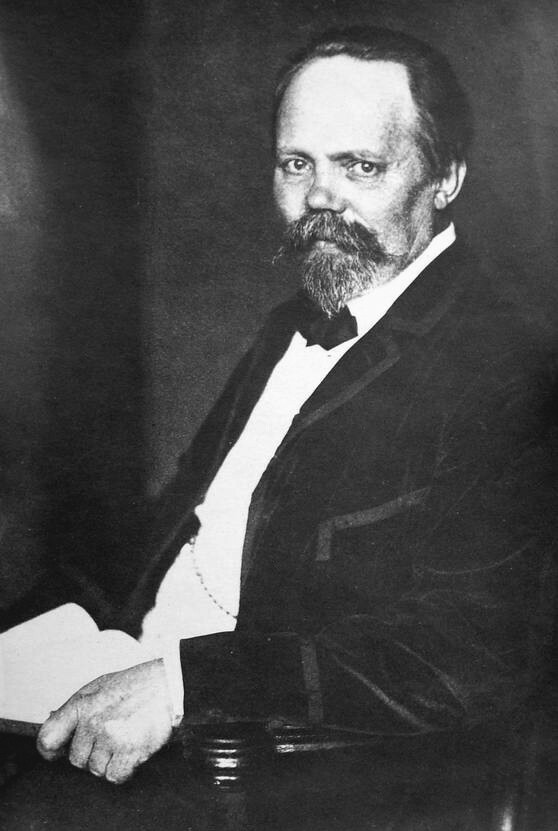
Humperdinck, c. 1910

Engelbert Humperdinck (German: [ˈɛŋl̩bɛʁt ˈhʊmpɐdɪŋk]; 1 September 1854 – 27 September 1921) was a German composer of opera. He is best known for his opera Hansel and Gretel (1893).

== Early life ==
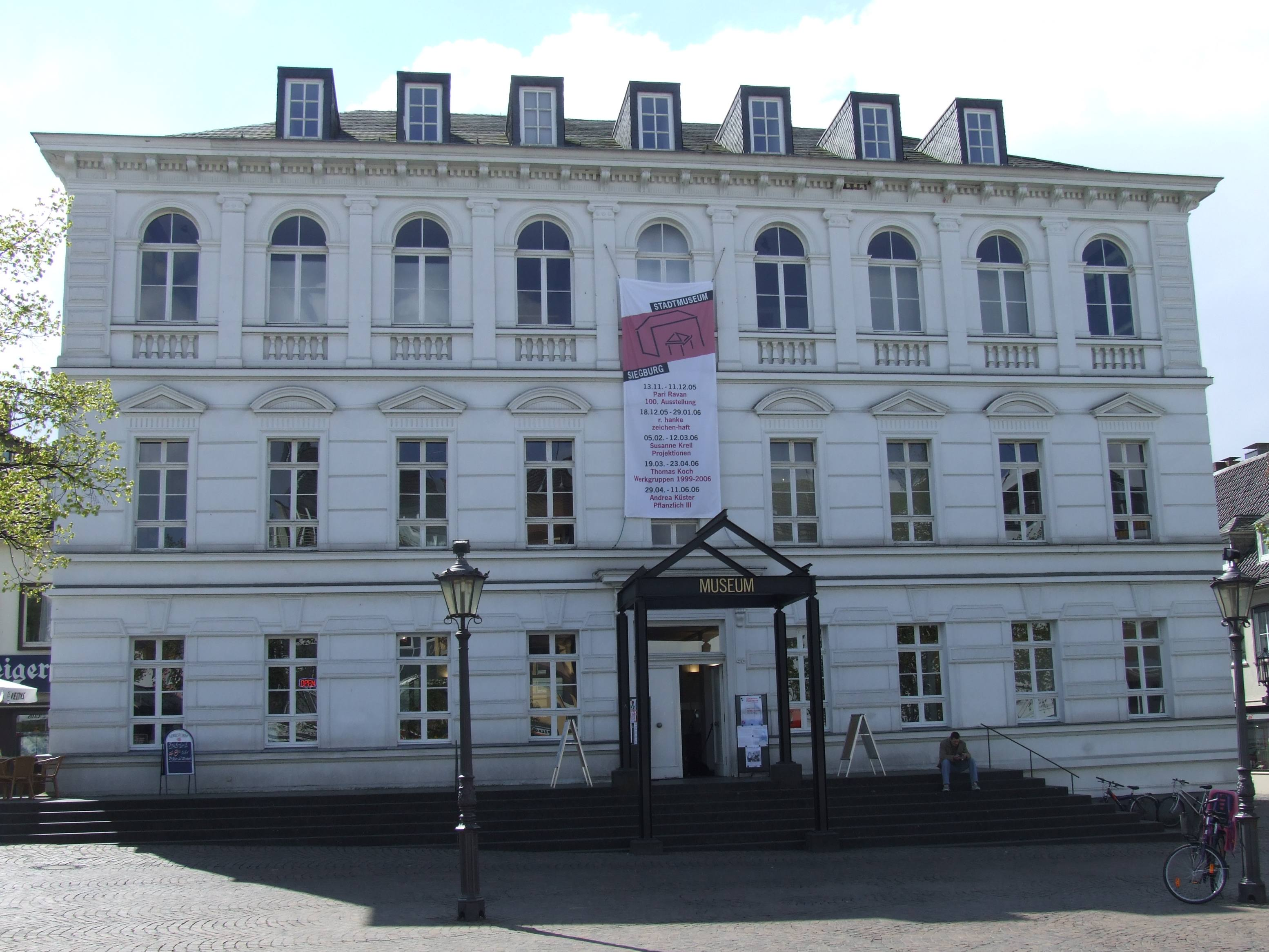
Birthplace of Humperdinck

Humperdinck was born in Siegburg in the Rhine Province in 1854. After receiving piano lessons, he produced his first composition at the age of seven. His first attempts at works for the stage were two singspiele written when he was 13. His parents disapproved of his plans for a career in music and encouraged him to study architecture.

But he began taking music classes under Ferdinand Hiller and Isidor Seiss at the Cologne Conservatory in 1872. In 1876, he won a scholarship that enabled him to go to Munich, where he studied with Franz Lachner and later with Josef Rheinberger. In 1879, he won the first Mendelssohn Award given by the Mendelssohn Stiftung (foundation) in Berlin.

He went to Italy, where he became acquainted with composer Richard Wagner in Naples. Wagner invited him to join him in Bayreuth, and during 1880 and 1881 Humperdinck assisted in the production of Parsifal. He also served as music tutor to Wagner's son, Siegfried.

After winning another prize, Humperdinck traveled through Italy, France, and Spain. For two years, he taught at the Gran Teatre del Liceu Conservatory in Barcelona. In 1887, he returned to Cologne. He was appointed professor at the Hoch Conservatory in Frankfurt in 1890 and also teacher of harmony at Julius Stockhausen's Vocal School. By this time he had composed several works for chorus and a Humoreske for small orchestra, which became very popular in Germany.

== Hänsel und Gretel ==
External audio
- Audio in English of Humperdinck's Hänsel und Gretel conducted by Barbara Schubert and the University of Chicago Symphony Orchestra in 2003

Humperdinck's reputation rests chiefly on his opera Hänsel und Gretel, on which he began work in Frankfurt in 1890. He first composed four songs to accompany a puppet show his nieces were giving at home. Then, using a libretto and thematic suggestions by his sister Adelheid Wette, rather loosely based on the version of the fairy tale by the Grimm Brothers, he composed a singspiel of 16 songs with piano accompaniment and connecting dialogue. By January 1891, he had begun working on a complete orchestration.

The opera was premiered in Weimar on 23 December 1893, conducted by Richard Strauss. With its synthesis of Wagnerian techniques and traditional German folk songs, Hansel and Gretel was an instant success.

Hansel and Gretel has always been Humperdinck's most popular work. In 1923, the Royal Opera House (London) chose it for their first complete radio opera broadcast. Eight years later, it was the first opera transmitted live from the Metropolitan Opera (New York).

== Later career ==
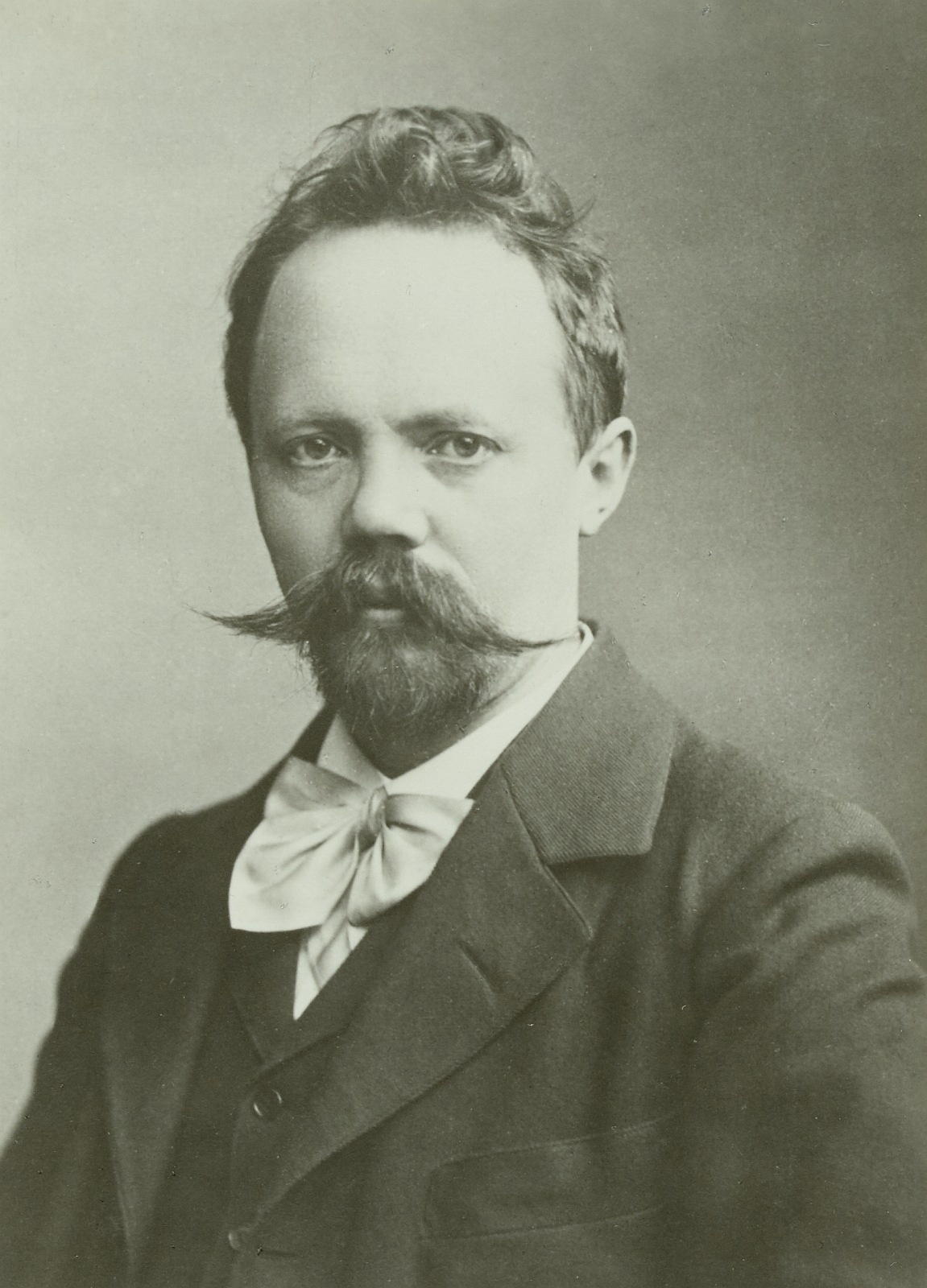
Engelbert Humperdinck

In 1896, Kaiser Wilhelm II made Humperdinck a Professor and he went to live in Boppard, Rhineland-Palatinate. Four years later, he went to Berlin, where he was appointed head of a Meister-Schule of composition. His students included Basque composer Andrés Isasi, Portuguese composer Luís de Freitas Branco, Hildegard Quiel, and Kurt Weill.

Among Humperdinck's other stage works are:

- Die sieben Geißlein (The Seven Little Kids), 1895
- Königskinder (King's Children), 1897, 1910
- Dornröschen (Sleeping Beauty), 1902
- Die Heirat wider Willen (The Reluctant Marriage), 1905
- Bübchens Weihnachtstraum (The Christmas Dream), 1906
- Die Marketenderin (The Provisioner), 1914
- Gaudeamus: Szenen aus dem deutschen Studentenleben (Gaudeamus igitur: Scenes from German Student Life), 1919

While composing those works, Humperdinck held various teaching positions of distinction. He also collaborated in the theater, providing incidental music for a number of Max Reinhardt's productions in Berlin: for example, Shakespeare's The Merchant of Venice in 1905.

Although recognized as a disciple of Wagner rather than an innovator, Humperdinck was the first composer to use Sprechgesang—a vocal technique halfway between singing and speaking—in his melodrama Königskinder (1897).

On 5 January 1912 Humperdinck suffered a severe stroke. Although he recovered, his left hand remained permanently paralyzed. He continued to compose, completing Gaudeamus with the help of his son, Wolfram, in 1918.

In 1914, Humperdinck is thought to have applied for the post of director of the Sydney Conservatorium of Music in Australia, but with the outbreak of World War I, it became unthinkable for a German to hold that position. Belgium's Henri Verbrugghen was selected for the job, as Belgium was an ally of the United Kingdom. Also in 1914, Humperdinck signed the Manifesto of the Ninety-Three, declaring support for German military actions during early World War I.

On 26 September 1921, Humperdinck attended a performance of Carl Maria von Weber's Der Freischütz in Neustrelitz, which was Wolfram's first effort as a stage director. He suffered a heart attack during the performance and died the next day, aged 67, from a second heart attack. The Berlin State Opera performed Hansel and Gretel in his memory a few weeks later. Humperdinck was buried at the Stahnsdorf South-Western Cemetery near Berlin.

== Family ==
Humperdinck married Louise Hedwig Laura Taxer on 19 May 1892 in Poppelsdorf bei Bonn. They had four children, Wolfram, Clara, Irmgard, and Senta.

== Legacy - Humperdinck name ==
In 1965, British singer Arnold Dorsey adopted "Engelbert Humperdinck" as his stage name.

The main belt asteroid 9913 Humperdinck, discovered in 1977, was named after the composer.

== See also ==
- List of music students by teacher: G to J#Engelbert Humperdinck
