= Elisabeth Söderström =

Swedish soprano (1927–2009)

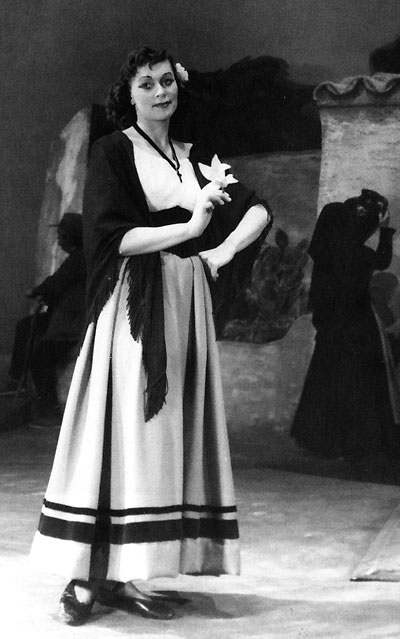
As Lola in Cavalleria rusticana, Royal Swedish Opera Stockholm, 1954.

Anna Elisabeth Söderström CBE (married name Olow; 7 May 1927 – 20 November 2009) was a Swedish soprano who performed both opera and song, and was known as a leading interpreter of the works of Janáček, Rachmaninoff and Sibelius. She was particularly well known for her recordings of the lead soprano roles in the three Janáček operas Jenůfa, Káťa Kabanová, and The Makropoulos Affair, all of which received Gramophone Awards. The Gramophone critic John Warrack described her portrayal of Káťa Kabanová as "establishing by an infinity of subtle touches and discreet, sensitive singing the picture of Káta as the richest and most human character in the drama".

== Career ==
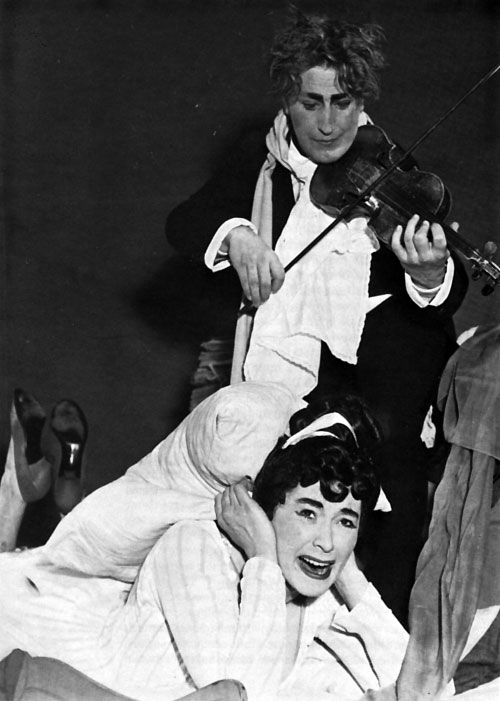
Sven Erik Vikström (Orpheus) with Elisabeth Söderström (Eurydice), Royal Swedish Opera, 1955.

Born in Stockholm, Söderström received her first musical schooling from Adelaide von Skilondz and later studied at the Royal College of Music, Stockholm. She made her debut in 1947 at the Drottningholm Palace Theatre singing in one of Mozart's lesser-known works Bastien et Bastienne. From 1949 to 1980 she called the Royal Swedish Opera her home but she frequently appeared at some of the largest opera houses in the world. She was also a regular visitor to the recording studio. Between 1959 and 1964 Söderström was contracted by the Metropolitan Opera in New York City to which she would return in 1983–87. Her last stage performance was in 1999 in Tchaikovsky's The Queen of Spades at the Metropolitan Opera. In 1978 she created the role of Amanda/Clitoria in György Ligeti's Le Grand Macabre at the Royal Swedish Opera.

During her long career, Söderström made a name for herself as a technically perfect and at the same time warm soprano with a personal style which allowed her to sing in a wide variety of works ranging from the 17th century to contemporary. Between appearances in fully staged operas, Söderström gave numerous concerts and recitals in all corners of the world. She made a variety of recordings, including the complete songs of Sergei Rachmaninoff, accompanied by Vladimir Ashkenazy.

Between 1993 and 1996 Söderström was the director of the Drottningholm Palace Theatre, the same stage where she had made her debut almost 50 years earlier. In 1983, she sang the final trio from Strauss's Der Rosenkavalier with Kathleen Battle and Frederica von Stade at The Metropolitan Opera Centennial Gala conducted by James Levine.

In 1978 she published a collection of stories from her career and thoughts on performing entitled I min tonart; this was translated in English as In My Own Key.

== Personal life ==
Elisabeth Söderström was married to commander Sverker Olow from 1950 until her death. They lived in Lidingö.

== Death ==
She died in the Swedish capital, Stockholm, on 20 November 2009, aged 82, from complications from a stroke.

== Honours ==
Elisabeth Söderström received a number of honours, both in Sweden and abroad. Among them:

- 1959 – the Italian Order of the Star of Italian Solidarity
- 1972 – the Swedish Commander of the Royal Order of Vasa
- 1973 – the French Commandeur de l´Ordre des Arts et Lettres
- 1985 – the British Commander of the Most Excellent Order of the British Empire
- 1997 – one of the Eurostar locomotives was named after her

== Discography ==
- Humperdinck: Hänsel und Gretel, Columbia CD, M2K-35898 (US), M2K-79217 (Europe), 1988
- The Metropolitan Opera Centennial Gala, Deutsche Grammophon DVD, 00440-073-4538, 2009
- Janáček: Věc Makropulos (Sir Charles Mackerras conducting) Decca LP D14402, 1979. London LP, 12109 (US), 1980. Decca CD 723702, 2006
