= Christa Ludwig =

German mezzo-soprano (1928–2021)

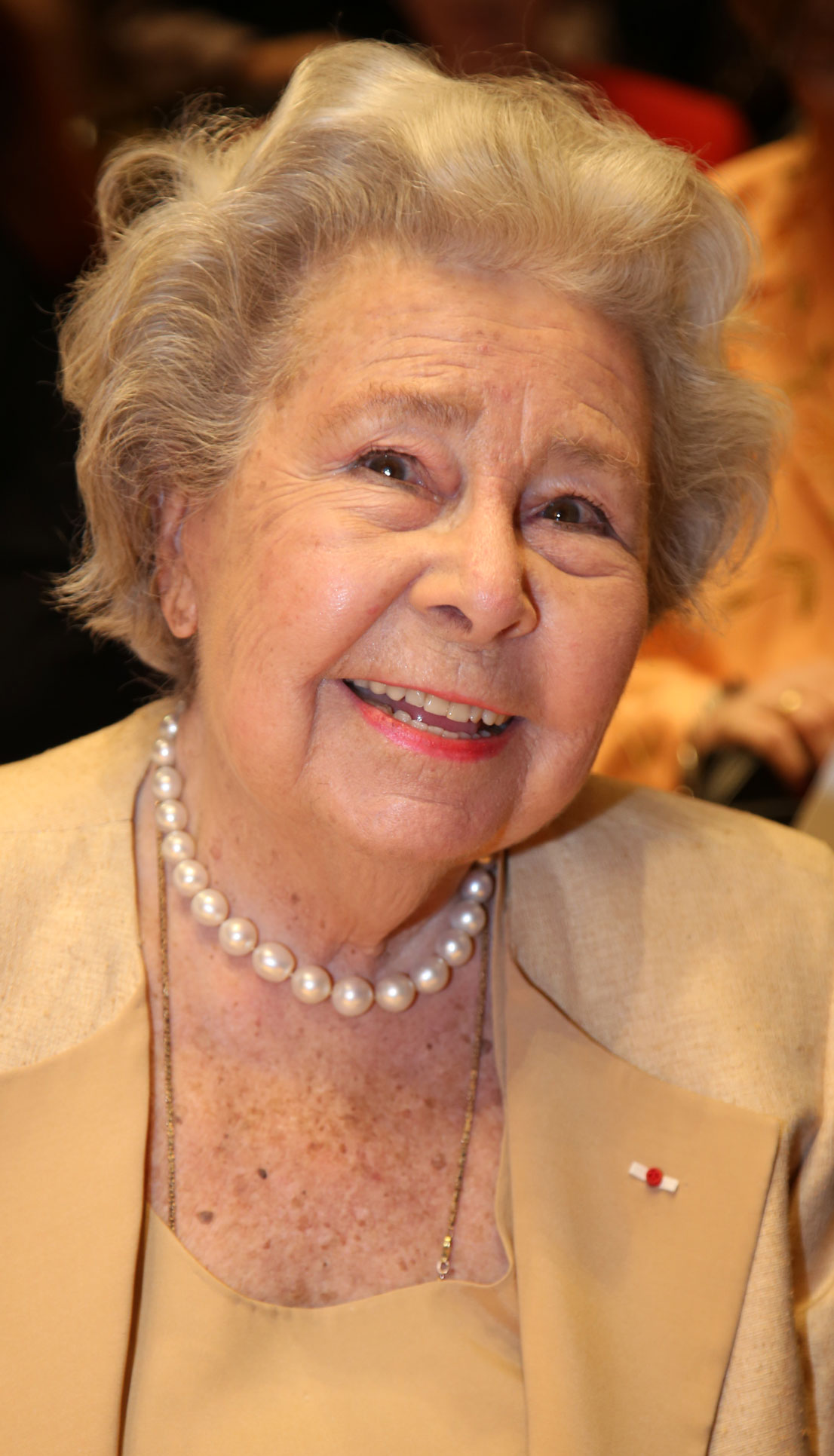
- Christa Ludwig in 2015
- Born: 16 March 1928; Berlin, Germany
- Died: 24 April 2021 (aged 93); Klosterneuburg, Austria
- Occupation: Operatic mezzo-soprano
- Organizations: Vienna State Opera; Metropolitan Opera
- Title: Kammersängerin
- Spouses: Walter Berry (m. 1957; div. 1970) Paul-Emile Deiber (m. 1972; died 2011)

Christa Ludwig (16 March 1928 – 24 April 2021) was a German mezzo-soprano and sometime dramatic soprano, distinguished for her performances of opera, lieder, oratorio, and other major religious works like masses, passions, and solos in symphonic literature. Her performing career spanned almost half a century, from the late 1940s until the early 1990s.

She sang at many international opera houses and festivals, including at the Vienna State Opera from 1955 to 1994, and at the Metropolitan Opera in many roles. She is remembered for roles such as Mozart's Dorabella, Beethoven's Leonore in Fidelio, Wagner's Kundry, and both Octavian and the Marschallin in Der Rosenkavalier by Richard Strauss. In Vienna, she created the title role of Gottfried von Einem's Der Besuch der alten Dame in 1971.

She is widely recognised as having been one of the most significant and distinguished singers of the 20th century. The NPR Listener's Encyclopedia of Classical Music (2006) stated "Ludwig possessed a voice of exquisite richness and, when needed, breathtaking amplitude. She had the ability to impart dramatic urgency to a performance, the hallmark of a great singer."

== Early life and education ==
Ludwig was born in Berlin to a musical family. Her father, Anton Ludwig, who began his singing career as a baritone and later moved into the tenor repertory, was also an opera administrator, and her mother, Eugenie Besalla-Ludwig, was a mezzo-soprano who sang at the Aachen Opera during Herbert von Karajan's period as conductor. Ludwig grew up in Aachen, where her first voice teacher was her mother. At age eight, she sang an aria of the Queen of the Night in Mozart's The Magic Flute.

At Aachen Conservatory, she studied piano, cello, flute and music theory. The family moved to Hanau when their home was bombed in 1944. She studied voice at the Musikhochschule Frankfurt.

== Career ==
Ludwig made her stage debut in 1946 at the age of 18 as Orlovsky in Die Fledermaus by Johann Strauss at the Oper Frankfurt, where she sang until 1952. She was a member of the Staatstheater Darmstadt from 1952 to 1954, then sang for the 1954/55 season at the Staatsoper Hannover. She joined the Vienna State Opera in 1955, where she became one of its principal artists and was awarded the title Kammersängerin in 1962. She performed with the company for more than thirty years in 43 opera roles and 769 performances. In 1954, she made her debut at the Salzburg Festival as Cherubino in Mozart's The Marriage of Figaro, conducted by Karl Böhm, and appeared there regularly until 1981. At the Vienna State Opera, she created the title role of Gottfried von Einem's Der Besuch der alten Dame on 23 May 1971, conducted by Horst Stein and alongside Eberhard Waechter as her lover Alfred Ill. The performance was recorded by Deutsche Grammophon, and reissued on CD by Amadeo and later Orfeo.

She first performed in the U.S. at the Lyric Opera of Chicago as Dorabella in Mozart's Così fan tutte in 1959. The same year, she appeared at the Metropolitan Opera (Met) in New York City as Cherubino in The Marriage of Figaro, conducted by Erich Leinsdorf. Louis Biancolli wrote in his review for the World Telegram and Sun:

... the new Cherubino – Berlin-born Christa Ludwig, a leading mezzo at Darmstadt, Salzburg and Vienna since her debut as Prince Orlofsky in "Fledermaus" in 1946. She is a valuable acquisition. Gifted with a bright, warm voice; Miss Ludwig was a lively and believable Cherubino. Her singing was precise and even, each tone clear and true, and her Italian rippled along like a second music. The ovation was fully deserved.

She subsequently sang 121 performances in 15 roles with the Met, where she quickly became one of the audience's favourites. Her next role, again in trousers, was Octavian in Der Rosenkavalier by Strauss, in a live broadcast conducted by Leinsdorf, with Lisa Della Casa as the Marschallin, Elisabeth Söderström as Sophie, and Oskar Czerwenka in his Met debut as Ochs. Her repertoire there also included The Dyer's Wife in the Met's first performances of Die Frau ohne Schatten by Richard Strauss, then (in 1969) the Marschallin in Der Rosenkavalier, Klytemnestra in Elektra, Ortrud in Wagner's Lohengrin, Brangäne in Tristan und Isolde, Fricka in both Das Rheingold and Die Walküre, Waltraute in Götterdämmerung, Kundry in Parsifal, the title role in Beethoven's Fidelio, Didon in Les Troyens by Berlioz, Charlotte in Massenet's Werther, and Amneris in Verdi's Aida. In 1960, she performed as Adalgisa alongside Maria Callas as Bellini's Norma for an EMI recording. She appeared at the Bayreuth Festival first as Brangäne in Tristan und Isolde in 1966. She first appeared at the Royal Opera House in London in 1968 as Amneris in Verdi's Aida.

As Ludwig's voice matured, she expanded her repertoire from lyric and spinto mezzo-roles to dramatic roles. Her vast repertory eventually grew to encompass Princess Eboli in Verdi's Don Carlo which she sang at La Scala in Milan, in Salzburg and in Vienna, the title role in Bizet's Carmen, Ulrica in Verdi's Un ballo in maschera, Octavia in Monteverdi's L'incoronazione di Poppea, and contemporary roles by von Einem and Orff. She also ventured briefly into the spinto and dramatic soprano repertoire with performances as Lady Macbeth in Verdi's Macbeth, the Dyer's Wife, the Marschallin and Leonore in Fidelio.

In addition to her opera performances, Ludwig regularly gave recitals of lieder, with pianists including Sebastian Peschko, Gerald Moore, Geoffrey Parsons and on occasion Leonard Bernstein. She performed as a soloist with orchestras, including works by Schubert, Schumann, Brahms, Wolf, Mahler and Strauss. She was one of few women to tackle and record Schubert's Winterreise. She also sang Bach's music and recorded many of his large vocal works, such as the St Matthew Passion conducted by Otto Klemperer in 1961, with Peter Pears as the Evangelist and Dietrich Fischer-Dieskau as the voice of Christ, and the Mass in B minor the same year, Karajan's third recording of the work, with Leontyne Price, Nicolai Gedda, Gérard Souzay and her husband Walter Berry. She recorded Bach's Christmas Oratorio conducted by Karl Richter in 1965, with Gundula Janowitz, Fritz Wunderlich and Franz Crass. She performed Mahler's Second Symphony with Bernstein in 1967. and Mahler's 3rd Symphony with Bernstein in Vienna in 1972, the video recording of which is available on Youtube. In the same year 1967, she recorded a definitive Das Lied von der Erde with tenor Fritz Wunderlich, conducted by Otto Klemperer. From September 1973 to January 1974, she took part in Karajan's fourth recording of Bach's Mass in B minor, with Janowitz, Peter Schreier, Robert Kerns and Karl Ridderbusch.

In 1993 and 1994, she gave a series of farewell recitals in many cities; her last appearance at the Metropolitan Opera was as Fricka in Die Walküre. Her final live operatic performance was as Klytemnestra in Elektra for the Vienna State Opera in December 1994.

== Personal life ==
In times where personalities are thinly sown, we have first class, yes excellent, musical practitioners, who lack intuition, imagination, and a feeling for composers, who, even though they lived in the past, can speak to us about today. Courage is needed to reveal one's own feelings in interpretation and not tell the audience with raised forefinger: "The composer wanted it like this, and no other way." But at the same time we singers must never forget that we are only the servants of the great minds who created all the wonderful pieces of music we enjoy today.—Christa Ludwig

From 1957 to 1970, Ludwig was married to the bass-baritone Walter Berry; they had a son. The couple performed together frequently, notably as the Dyer and his wife in Die Frau ohne Schatten. In 1972, she married the French theatre actor Paul-Emile Deiber, who died in 2011.

Ludwig's first memoir, Und ich wäre so gern Primadonna gewesen (And I would so much have liked to be a primadonna), was published in 1994; an English translation by Regina Domeraski titled In My Own Voice was published in 1999. Her second memoir, "Leicht muss man sein": Erinnerungen an die Zukunft ("One must be lighter": memories of the future), as told to Erna Cuesta and Franz Zoglauer, was published in 2018.

Ludwig died at her home in Klosterneuburg, Austria in April 2021, at the age of 93.

== Decorations and awards ==
- 1962: Austrian Kammersängerin
- 1969: Austrian Decoration for Science and Art
- 1980: Golden Ring of the Vienna State Opera
- 1980: Silver Rose of the Vienna Philharmonic
- 1980: Golden Gustav Mahler Medal
- 1980: Hugo Wolf Medal of the International Hugo Wolf Society
- 1981: Honorary Member of the Vienna State Opera
- 1989: Commander of the Order of Arts and Letters (France)
- 1994: Grand Decoration of Honour for Services to the Republic of Austria
- 2004: Commander's Cross of the Order of Merit of the Federal Republic of Germany
- 2007: Grand Decoration of Honour in Silver for Services to the Republic of Austria
- 2008: Lifetime Achievement Award at Midem
- 2008: Saeculum-Glashütte Original Music Festival award at the Dresden Music Festival
- 2008: Honorary doctorate from the Fryderyk Chopin University of Music, Warsaw
- 2010: Commander of the Legion of Honour (France)
- 2010: Hugo Wolf Medal of the International Hugo Wolf Academy
- 2016: Lifetime Achievement Award at the Gramophone Awards
- 2018: Lifetime Achievement Award at the Opus Klassik
