= Janet Baker =

English mezzo-soprano (born 1933)

Dame Janet Baker CH DBE FRSA
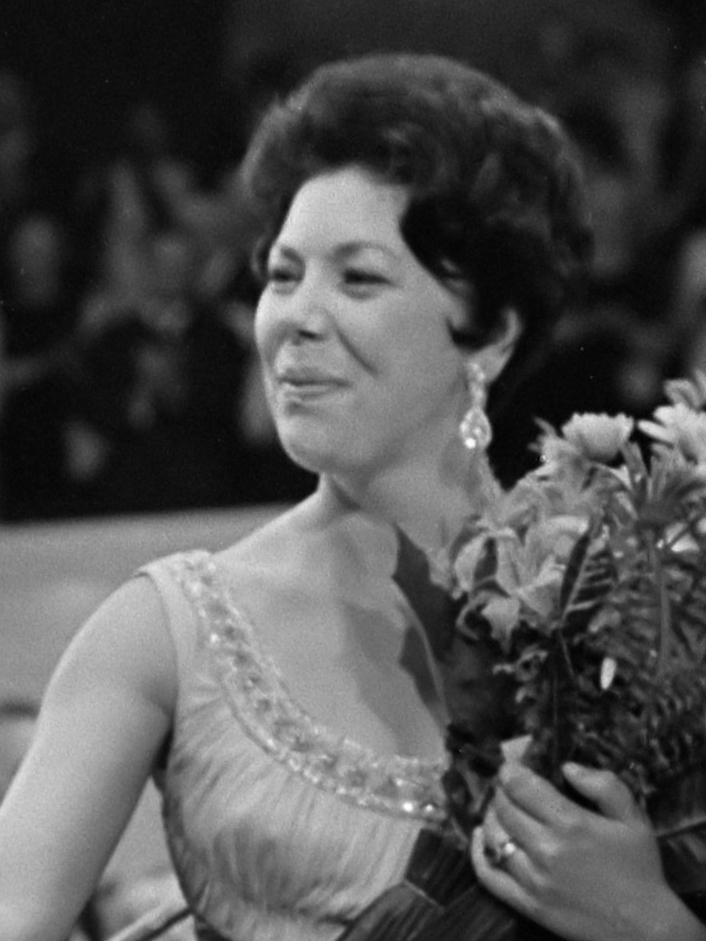
- Janet Baker in 1967
- Born: Janet Abbott Baker; 21 August 1933 (age 93); Hatfield, West Riding of Yorkshire, England
- Occupation: Opera singer (mezzo-soprano)
- Years active: 1950s–1980s
- Awards: Companion of Honour; Dame Commander of the Order of the British Empire; Léonie Sonning Music Prize

Dame Janet Abbott Baker (born 21 August 1933) is an English mezzo-soprano best known as an opera, concert, and lieder singer.

Baker is particularly closely associated with baroque and early Italian opera and the works of Benjamin Britten. During her career, which lasted from the 1950s to the 1980s, she was considered an outstanding singing actress and widely admired for her dramatic intensity, perhaps best represented in her famous portrayal as Dido, the tragic heroine of Berlioz's magnum opus, Les Troyens. As a concert performer, Baker was noted for her interpretations of the music of Gustav Mahler and Edward Elgar. David Gutman, writing in Gramophone, described her performance of Mahler's Kindertotenlieder as "intimate, almost self-communing".

== Biography and career ==
=== Early life ===
Janet Abbott Baker was born in Hatfield, in the West Riding of Yorkshire, where her father was an engineer as well as a chorister. Members of her family worked at Bentley Pit, in Doncaster. She attended York College for Girls and then Wintringham Girls' Grammar School in Grimsby. The death, when she was 10 years old, of her elder brother Peter, from a heart condition, was a formative moment that made her take responsibility for the rest of her life; she revealed this in a BBC Radio 3 Lebrecht Interview in September 2011.

In her early years Baker worked in a bank, transferring to London in 1953 where she trained with Meriel St Clair and Helene Isepp, whose son Martin became her regular accompanist. Knocked down by a bus in 1956, she suffered concussion and a persistently painful back injury. In the same year she came second in the Kathleen Ferrier Memorial Competition at the Wigmore Hall, winning national attention.

=== Debut ===
In 1956, she made her stage debut with Oxford University's Opera Club as Miss Róza in Smetana's The Secret. That year, she also made her debut at Glyndebourne. In 1959, she sang Eduige in the Handel Opera Society's Rodelinda; other Handel operas included Ariodante (1964), of which she later made a notable recording with Raymond Leppard, and Orlando (1966), which she sang at the Barber Institute, Birmingham.

=== Opera ===
With the English Opera Group at Aldeburgh, Baker sang Purcell's Dido and Aeneas in 1962, Polly (in Benjamin Britten's version of The Beggar's Opera) and Lucretia (in Britten's The Rape of Lucretia). At Glyndebourne she appeared again as Dido (1966) and as Diana/Jupiter in Francesco Cavalli's La Calisto, and Penelope in Monteverdi's Il ritorno d'Ulisse in Patria. For Scottish Opera she sang Dorabella in Mozart's Così fan tutte and Dido in Berlioz's The Trojans, as well as Dido in Purcell's Dido and Aeneas, Octavian in Richard Strauss's Der Rosenkavalier, the Composer in Ariadne auf Naxos and the role of Orfeo in Gluck's Orfeo ed Euridice. The latter was considered her signature role; she sang it in many productions, and a videotaped performance from Glyndebourne is available (see below).

In 1966, Baker made her debut as Hermia in Britten's A Midsummer Night's Dream at the Royal Opera House, Covent Garden, and went on to sing there Berlioz's Dido; Kate in Britten's Owen Wingrave; Mozart's Vitellia (in La clemenza di Tito) and Idamante (in Idomeneo); Cressida in William Walton's Troilus and Cressida; and the title role in Gluck's Alceste (1981). For the English National Opera, she sang the title role in Monteverdi's L'incoronazione di Poppea (1971), Charlotte in Massenet's Werther, and the title roles in Donizetti's Maria Stuarda and Handel's Giulio Cesare.

=== Oratorio and song ===
During this same period she made an equally strong impact on audiences in the concert hall, both in oratorio roles and solo recitals. Among her most notable achievements are her recordings of the Angel in Elgar's The Dream of Gerontius, made with Sir John Barbirolli in December 1964 and Sir Simon Rattle over twenty years later; her 1965 performances of Elgar's Sea Pictures and Mahler's Rückert Lieder, also recorded with Barbirolli; and, also from 1965, the first commercial recording of Ralph Vaughan Williams's Christmas oratorio Hodie under Sir David Willcocks with The Bach Choir. In 1963, she sang the contralto part in the first performance at the BBC Promenade Concerts of Mahler's Resurrection Symphony under the direction of Leopold Stokowski, then making his Proms debut appearances. In the summer of 1969 she partnered the distinguished German baritone Dietrich Fischer-Dieskau in Mendelssohn, Brahms, romantic duets at the Queen Elizabeth Hall recorded by EMI and now available on CD. She performed in 1971 for the Peabody Mason Concert series in Boston.

In 1976 she premiered the solo cantata Phaedra, written for her by Britten; and Dominick Argento's Pulitzer Prize-winning song cycle From the Diary of Virginia Woolf, also written with her voice in mind. She has also been highly praised for her insightful performances of Brahms's Alto Rhapsody and Wagner's Wesendonck Lieder, as well as solo songs from the French, German and English repertoire.

=== Retirement ===
Her final operatic appearance was as Orfeo in Gluck's Orfeo ed Euridice, on 17 July 1982, at Glyndebourne. In May 1988, she repeated the role in a concert performance with the Oratorio Society of New York (an unannounced farewell to the U.S.). She had continued to perform lieder recitals, retiring for good in 1989 (although she did make a small handful of recordings in January 1990). She published a memoir, Full Circle, in 1982. In 1991, Baker was elected Chancellor of the University of York. She held the position until 2004, when she was succeeded by Greg Dyke. An enthusiastic Patron of the Leeds International Pianoforte Competition, she gave an address at the closing ceremony of the 2009 event.

== Honours and awards ==
Janet Baker was made a Commander of the Order of the British Empire (CBE) in 1970 and appointed to Dame Commander (DBE) in 1976. She was appointed a member of the Order of the Companions of Honour (CH) in 1993. In 1968, she was initiated as an Honorary Member of Sigma Alpha Iota International Music Fraternity by the Alpha Omicron chapter at Occidental College, California, United States. In 1971, the Hamburg-based Alfred Toepfer Foundation awarded her its annual Shakespeare Prize. She received the Léonie Sonning Music Prize of Denmark in 1979. She is the recipient of both Honorary Membership (1987) and the Gold Medal (1990) of the Royal Philharmonic Society. She has been a vice-president of The Bach Choir since 1983. In 2007, she received the Distinguished Musician Award from the Incorporated Society of Musicians and in 2011 she was installed as an Honorary Freeman of the Worshipful Company of Musicians at a ceremony in the City of London. This is the highest honour the company can bestow on a fellow musician. She was awarded a Fellowship by the Royal Northern College of Music (FRNCM) in 1978.

She was voted into Gramophone magazine's inaugural Hall of Fame in 2012.

== Private life ==
She married James Keith Shelley in 1957 in Harrow; he became her manager and accompanied her to engagements. They decided not to have children for the sake of her career. Following her retirement as a singer, she did perform and record some spoken roles, for example the role of the narrator in Britten's incidental music for The Rescue of Penelope; in later years, apart from occasional public appearances such as the 2009 Leeds event, she said she had "nothing to do with anyone except close friends". Those friends include the singer Felicity Lott, pianist Imogen Cooper, conductor Jane Glover and actress Patricia Routledge, all of whom appeared in a BBC documentary profile, Janet Baker in her own words, shown in 2019. After her husband suffered a stroke, she cared for him at home. He died in June 2019.

== Recordings ==
- Bellini: I Capuleti e i Montecchi, Beverly Sills, Robert Lloyd, Nicolai Gedda, Raimund Herincx, John Alldis Choir, New Philharmonia Orchestra, conducted by Giuseppe Patanè. 1975. Studio recording. EMI Records Ltd.
- Berlioz: Béatrice et Bénédict, with Christiane Eda-Pierre, Helen Watts, Robert Tear, London Symphony Orchestra, Colin Davis. Recorded Henry Wood Hall, 19–22 December 1977. LP Philips 6700 121. CD 416 952 2.
- Berlioz: Les Troyens: scenes from Act V and La Mort de Cléopâtre, London Symphony Orchestra, Alexander Gibson. Recorded Watford Town Hall, 14–15 September 1969. LP – ASD2516, CD CDM7 69544 2.
- Berlioz: L'Enfance du Christ, Op.25 – John Alldis Choir, London Symphony Orchestra, Colin Davis. Recorded Watford Town Hall, 24–28 October 1976. LP Philips 6700 106, CD 415 949 2.
- Berlioz: La Mort de Cléopâtre (with Herminie and 5 songs), London Symphony Orchestra, Sir Colin Davis cond. (Philips, rec. 03/1979)
- Brahms: Alto Rhapsody, op 53, with the male voices of the John Alldis Choir, London Philharmonic Orchestra, Sir Adrian Boult. Recorded Abbey Road Studios, London, 15 December 1970. Producer: Christopher Bishop; Balance engineer: Christopher Parker. CDM 7 69424 2.
- Britten: Spring Symphony, op 44, with Sheila Armstrong, Robert Tear, London Symphony Orchestra, André Previn. Recorded Kingsway Hall, 28–29 June 1978. LP ASD3650, CD CDC7 47667 2
- Delius: Songs of Sunset, John Shirley-Quirk, Royal Liverpool Philharmonic Orchestra and Chorus, Charles Groves
- Elgar: The Dream of Gerontius, Hallé Orchestra, John Barbirolli. Recorded December 1964.
- Elgar: The Dream of Gerontius, City of Birmingham Symphony Orchestra, CBSO Chorus, Simon Rattle. Recorded September 1986.
- Elgar: Sea Pictures, Op. 37, London Symphony Orchestra, John Barbirolli. Recorded 30 August 1965, Abbey Road Studio 1. LP – ASD655, CD CDC7 47329 2
- Gluck: Orpheus and Euridice at Glyndebourne Festival Opera, conducted by Raymond Leppard. On video. Copyright 1982 by National Video Corporation Limited.
- Handel: Julius Caesar with the English National Opera; Charles Mackerras conducting (Chandos CHAN 3019; recorded 1–7 August 1984; released 1999). A studio-made video of the ENO production, recorded at Limehouse Studio, was released on video and later DVD.
- Mahler: Des Knaben Wunderhorn with Geraint Evans and the London Philharmonic Orchestra under Wym Morris, (Nimbus 1966)
- Mahler: Kindertotenlieder with the Hallé Orchestra; John Barbirolli conducting (EMI LP cat. no. ASD 2338; released 1968)
- Mahler: Rückert Lieder with the Scottish National Orchestra under Jascha Horenstein (BBC Legends, 1967)
- Mahler: Rückert Lieder with the Hallé Orchestra; John Barbirolli conducting (EMI LP cat. no. ASD 2338; released 1968)
- Mahler: Rückert Lieder with the Israel Philharmonic Orchestra under Leonard Bernstein (Columbia, 1974)
- Mahler: Rückert Lieder with the London Symphony Orchestra under Michael Tilson Thomas (Columbia, 1987)
- Mahler: Das Lied von der Erde with Waldemar Kmentt and the Bavarian Radio Symphony Orchestra under Rafael Kubelik (Audite, 1970)
- Mahler: Das Lied von der Erde with Richard Lewis and the Cleveland Orchestra under George Szell (Arkadia, 1970)
- Mahler: Das Lied von der Erde with James King and the Royal Concertgebouw Orchestra under Bernard Haitink (Philips, 1975)
- Mahler: Das Lied von der Erde with Ludovic Spiess and the BBC Symphony Orchestra under Rudolf Kempe (BBC Legends, 1975)
- Mahler: Das Lied von der Erde with John Mitchinson and the BBC Northern Symphony Orchestra under Raymond Leppard (BBC Legends, 1977)
- Mahler: Symphony No. 2 with the London Symphony Orchestra, BBC Chorus etc., Leopold Stokowski conducting (BBC Proms 1963); (BBC Legends)
- Mahler: Symphony No. 2 with the Berlin Philharmonic Orchestra, St. Hedwig's Cathedral Choir under John Barbirolli (Nuova Era, 1965)
- Mahler: Symphony No. 2 with the London Symphony Orchestra, Edinburgh Festival Chorus under Leonard Bernstein (CBS, 1974)
- Mahler: Symphony No. 2, City of Birmingham Symphony Orchestra, CBSO Chorus, Simon Rattle. Recorded 1986.
- Mahler: Symphony No. 2 in "The Klemperer Legacy"; Chor und Symphonie-Orchester des Bayerischer Rundfunks; Otto Klemperer conducting (EMI, 1998)
- Mahler: Symphony No. 3 with the London Symphony Orchestra, London Symphony Chorus, Southend Boys' Choir under Michael Tilson Thomas (Columbia, 1987)
- Mozart: Cosi fan tutte, conducted by Colin Davis (Philips, 1974)
- Mozart: La clemenza di Tito, conducted by Colin Davis (Philips, 1977)
- Purcell: Dido and Aeneas, conducted by Anthony Lewis, English Chamber Orchestra, The St. Anthony Singers; rec. Oct. 1961; with Raimund Herincx as Aeneas. Decca Legendary Performances/UMG. SOL 60047.
- Rameau: Hippolyte et Aricie, conducted by Anthony Lewis, English Chamber Orchestra, The St. Anthony Singers; rec. 1966; with Robert Tear as Hippolyte and Angela Hickey as Aricie. L'oiseau Lyre.
- Schubert: Lieder. A double-CD with pianists Gerald Moore and Geoffrey Parsons, containing forty-two songs. EMI classics, 7243 5 69389 2
- Verdi: Requiem, with the Chicago Symphony Orchestra et alia under Georg Solti, Chicago Symphony Orchestra (Columbia, 1977)

== Videography ==
- Glyndebourne Festival Opera: a Gala Evening (1992), Arthaus Musik DVD, 100-432, 2004

Academic offices
Preceded by Sir Michael Swann	Chancellor of the University of York; 1991–2004	Succeeded by Greg Dyke
