= Geraint Evans =

Welsh operatic singer (1922–1992)

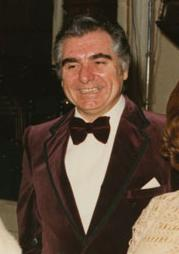
Geraint Evans

Sir Geraint Llewellyn Evans CBE (16 February 1922 – 19 September 1992) was a Welsh bass-baritone noted for operatic roles including Figaro in Le nozze di Figaro, Papageno in Die Zauberflöte, and the title role in Wozzeck. Evans was especially acclaimed for his performances in the title role of Verdi's Falstaff. He sang more than 70 different roles in a career that lasted from his first appearance at Covent Garden in 1948 to his farewell there in 1984.

== Early life ==
Evans was born in Cilfynydd, the only son of William John Evans (1899–1978), a coal miner, and his wife, Charlotte May, née Thomas (1901–1923). His family was Welsh speaking, and Evans spoke Welsh before he learned English.

On leaving school, aged 14, he worked as a window dresser for the High Class Ladies' Wear store in Pontypridd. He took singing lessons in Cardiff from Idloes Owen, who went on to found the Welsh National Opera, and sang with a local Methodist choir and the local amateur dramatic society. On the outbreak of World War II, he volunteered for the Royal Air Force; he was trained as a radio mechanic, but also took part in services entertainments.

After the war he worked for the British Forces Radio Network in Hamburg, where he sang with the radio chorus and took lessons from the baritone Theo Herrmann. He then studied with Fernando Carpi in Geneva and at the Guildhall School of Music and Drama in London first, for a short time, with Walther Gruner and then with Walter Hyde.

== Roles ==
During a career that lasted from his first appearance at Covent Garden in January 1948 to his farewell at the same house in June 1984, Evans played over 70 roles. He made his operatic début as the nightwatchman in Die Meistersinger at the Royal Opera House in 1948 and performed there as Figaro in Mozart's The Marriage of Figaro in 1949, a part which he sang more than 500 times during his international career. It was as Figaro that he made his début at La Scala, Milan in 1960, the first British singer to appear there since the war.

His Vienna Staatsoper début as a last-minute replacement impressed Herbert von Karajan, who offered him a contract with the company, but Evans declined, believing that his place was at Covent Garden, which he always regarded as his operatic home; despite international success he always called himself "Sir David [Webster]'s boy."

At the Glyndebourne Festival Opera in 1957, he first played the part with which he became internationally associated: the title role in Verdi's Falstaff, which he later played in opera houses around the world, including Covent Garden (1961, directed and designed by Franco Zeffirelli), the Vienna Staatsoper and the Metropolitan Opera (1964 in another Zeffirelli production). Other roles in which he was celebrated were Beckmesser in Die Meistersinger, Figaro, Don Pizarro in Fidelio, the title role in Don Pasquale, Dulcamara in L'elisir d'amore and Leporello in Don Giovanni. He was an outstanding actor in both comic and tragic roles such as Wozzeck.

Evans's repertoire was in the bass-baritone range such as Don Pizarro, and in Mozart he chose the lower roles - Leporello rather than Don Giovanni, Figaro rather than the Count. Roles higher in the baritone register were not comfortable for him: he never undertook Iago in Otello and his one attempt at the title role in Rigoletto, at Covent Garden in 1964, ended in disaster when his voice failed on the first night, on which occasion he took the unusual step of apologising to the audience at the final curtain.

Evans appeared in the premières of many modern British operas, including Vaughan Williams's Pilgrim's Progress (1951); Britten's Billy Budd (1951) and Gloriana (1953), Walton's Troilus and Cressida (1954), and Hoddinott's The Beach of Falesá (1974) and Murder the Magician (1976). In Billy Budd, Britten wrote much of the title part with Evans in mind, but the singer, after preparing the role, found that it lay uncomfortably high for him and opted for the lesser role of Mr Flint, the Sailing Master. Later in his career, Evans switched to the bass role of the evil John Claggart, Master at Arms.

== Recordings and television ==
Geraint Evans's studio recordings include Falstaff (conducted by Georg Solti); Mozart's Figaro (for both Otto Klemperer and Daniel Barenboim); Guglielmo in Così fan tutte (Klemperer); Ned Keene in Peter Grimes (conducted by the composer); Beckmesser in Die Meistersinger (conducted by Herbert von Karajan); Dulcamara in L'elisir d'amore (conducted by John Pritchard); Wozzeck (conducted by Karl Böhm).

Evans was among the line-up of top singers assembled by Walter Legge for Klemperer's 1961 recording of J. S. Bach's St. Matthew Passion. Evans also recorded three Gilbert and Sullivan roles for EMI conducted by Sir Malcolm Sargent: Ko-Ko in The Mikado (1957), the Duke of Plaza Toro in The Gondoliers (1957) and Jack Point in The Yeomen of the Guard (1958). A performance of Don Giovanni conducted by Solti with Cesare Siepi as Giovanni and Evans as Leporello, recorded at Covent Garden in 1962, was released on CD in 2006 on the Royal Opera House's own label. Lieder did not feature strongly in Evans's repertoire, but he recorded songs from Gustav Mahler's Des Knaben Wunderhorn with the young Janet Baker in 1966.

Between 1968 and 1981 Evans gave a series of televised masterclasses for the BBC in which he took young professional singers through key operatic works, including The Marriage of Figaro, Falstaff, Don Giovanni, The Magic Flute, La bohème, Peter Grimes, I Pagliacci and Così fan Tutte.

== Videography ==
- Glyndebourne Festival Opera: a Gala Evening (1992), Arthaus Musik DVD, 100–432, 2004

== Reputation, honours and retirement ==
Peter Ustinov, who directed Evans in opera, wrote of him:

His great qualities are a permanent commentary on all that make opera inviting, and finally impossible, to someone trained in the theatre. With his fine eighteenth-century face, looking like many of the actors' portraits in the Garrick club, dark eyes, bulbous nose and chubby cheeks, on the small side, bristling with invention, ferociously energetic, helpful, greedy, understanding, and unscrupulous, he knows from the outset what he intends to do, usually because he has already done it successfully, and rehearsals are spent getting his own way by running the whole gamut of techniques, from charm to bluster and back again.

The critic Peter Conrad commented on Evans's "physiognomic intelligence...His characterisations were built from the shoes up - his Claggart in Billy Budd minced; his Wozzeck plodded; his Beckmesser scurried like an officious beetle; his Falstaff had a pigeon-toed waddle."

Evans was knighted in 1969. Other honours conferred on him included: Fellow of the Guildhall School of Music (1960); Sir Charles Santley Memorial Award (1963); Hon. Doctor of Music, University of Wales, (1965); Harriet Cohen International Award (1967); Hon. RAM (1969); Hon. Doctor of Music, Leicester University (1969); Fellow, University College, Cardiff (1976); Fellow of the Royal Northern College of Music (1978); Honorary Fellow of Jesus College, Oxford; San Francisco Opera Medal (1980); Fidelio Medal (1980); Fellow of the Royal College of Music (1981); Fellow of the Royal Society of Arts (1984); Freeman, City of London (1984); Society of Cymmrodorion Medal, 1984; Hon. Doctor of Music Oxford University (1985); Order of St John (1986); Fellow, Trinity College, London (1987); Fellow University College, Swansea (1990).

After his retirement from the operatic stage in 1984 (his farewell performances were as Dulcamara), he continued to work as an operatic stage director. He was more in demand abroad than at home in this capacity and directed Peter Grimes, Billy Budd, Falstaff, The Marriage of Figaro and Don Pasquale in the U.S. In 1984 Evans published his memoirs, A Knight at the Opera, written in collaboration with Noël Goodwin. A paperback edition was published the following year.

Evans's final public appearance was in July 1992 (only two months before his death) at the gala to mark the closure of the old opera house at Glyndebourne, along with Janet Baker, Montserrat Caballé, Cynthia Haymon, Felicity Lott, Ruggero Raimondi, Elisabeth Söderström and Frederica von Stade.

Evans died in Bronglais Hospital, Aberystwyth, at the age of 70. A memorial service in Westminster Abbey was attended by more than 1,700 family, friends and admirers. The orchestra and chorus of the Royal Opera House were conducted by Bernard Haitink, Sir Georg Solti, Sir Colin Davis and Sir Edward Downes. Hymns were sung in Welsh, and lessons were read by Donald Sinden and Stuart Burrows. Among the congregation were Dame Joan Sutherland, Peter Brook, and representatives of the Welsh National Opera and the London Welsh rugby club.
