= Glyndebourne Festival Opera: A Gala Evening =

- Arthaus Musik DVD, 100-432
- Genre: Opera
- Directed by: Christopher Swann
- Starring: Kim Begley; Montserrat Caballé; Andrew Davis; Bernard Haitink; Cynthia Haymon; Felicity Lott; Benjamin Luxon; Ruggero Raimondi; Frederica von Stade
- Country of origin: United Kingdom
- Original languages: English, German and Italian

Production
- Executive producer: Dennis Marks
- Running time: 111 minutes
- Production companies: BBC TV and Glyndebourne Productions

Original release
- Network: BBC
- Release: 24 July 1992

Glyndebourne Festival Opera: A Gala Evening was a 111-minute concert staged by Glyndebourne Festival Opera on 24 July 1992, performed by Kim Begley, Montserrat Caballé, Cynthia Haymon, Felicity Lott, Benjamin Luxon, Ruggero Raimondi and Frederica von Stade with the Glyndebourne Festival Chorus and the London Philharmonic Orchestra under the direction of Sir Andrew Davis and Sir Bernard Haitink. It was televised in the United Kingdom by the BBC and released on VHS Videocassette by Kultur Video and on DVD by Image Entertainment, Arthaus Musik and Geneon.

== Background ==
The Glyndebourne Festival Opera was founded in 1934 by the English landowner John Christie (1882-1964) and his wife, the English and Canadian soprano Audrey Mildmay (1900-1953). The Christies mounted their productions in a theatre specially built for the purpose in the grounds of their manor house near Lewes in East Sussex. After John Christie's death, the management of the Festival was taken over by his son George Christie (1934-2013). George Christie demolished Glyndebourne's original theatre in 1992 in order to replace it with something larger and better equipped. The final performance in the old auditorium was a fund-raising gala presented at 8:30 p.m. on 24 July 1992 in the presence of His Royal Highness Charles, Prince of Wales. The event was sponsored by N M Rothschild & Sons, Rothschild & Cie Banque and The Private Bank and Trust Company Limited, with additional support from British American Tobacco plc. In acknowledgement of the Festival's history, the gala began and ended with excerpts from the opera which had been the first work performed in the Festival's original house, Mozart's Le nozze di Figaro. This was also the opera that was performed on the opening night of the new theatre in 1994.

== DVD chapter listing ==
- 1 (3:29) Opening credits and introduction by George Christie

Wolfgang Amadeus Mozart (1756-1791)

Le nozze di Figaro ("The marriage of Figaro", K. 492, Vienna, 1786), with a libretto by Lorenzo da Ponte (1749-1838), after La folle journée, ou Le mariage de Figaro ("The mad day, or The marriage of Figaro", 1778) by Pierre Beaumarchais (1732-1799)

- 2 (3:57) Canzona (Cherubino): "Voi che sapete", with Frederica von Stade, conducted by Andrew Davis

Introduction by George Christie

Giuseppe Verdi (1813-1901)

Macbeth (Florence, 1847), with a libretto by Francesco Maria Piave (1810-1876) incorporating additions by Andrea Maffei (1798-1885), after Macbeth (?1606) by William Shakespeare (1564-1616)

- 3 (9:35) Chorus and aria: "Patria oppressa!... Ah, la paterna mano", with the Glyndebourne Festival Chorus and Kim Begley, conducted by Andrew Davis

Otello (Milan, 1887), with a libretto by Arrigo Boito (1842-1918) after The Tragedy of Othello, the Moor of Venice (?1603) by William Shakespeare

- 4 (19:36) Willow song and prayer (Desdemona): "Salce, salce... Ave Maria", with Montserrat Caballé, conducted by Andrew Davis

Introduction by George Christie

Gioachino Rossini (1792-1868)

Il barbiere di Siviglia, ossia L'inutile precauzione ("The barber of Seville, or The useless precaution", Rome, 1816), with a libretto by Cesare Sterbini (1784-1831) after Le barbier de Seville (Paris, 1775) by Pierre Beaumarchais

- 5 (6:10) Aria (Rosina):"Una voce poco fà", with Frederica von Stade, conducted by Andrew Davis
- 6 (5:02) Aria (Don Basilio) "La calunnia è un venticello", with Ruggero Raimondi, conducted by Andrew Davis

Igor Stravinsky (1882-1971)

The Rake's Progress (Venice, 1951), with a libretto by W. H. Auden (1907-1973) and Chester Kallman (1921-1975), based on A Rake's Progress (1733-1735), a series of painting and engravings by William Hogarth (1697-1764)

- 7 (4:56) Chorus: "Ruin, disaster, shame", with the Glyndebourne Festival Chorus, conducted by Andrew Davis

Introduction by Janet Baker

Claudio Monteverdi (1567-1643)

Il ritorno d'Ulisse in patria ("The return of Ulysses to his homeland", SV. 325, Venice, 1639-1640 carnival season), with a libretto by Giacomo Badoaro (1602-1654) after The Odyssey (circa 700 BC) by Homer

- 8 (6:42) Duet: "Illustratevi o cieli", with Frederica von Stade and Benjamin Luxon, conducted by Andrew Davis

Introduction by George Christie

George Gershwin (1898-1937)

Porgy and Bess (Boston, 1935), with a libretto by DuBose Heyward (1885-1940) and Ira Gershwin (1896-1983), after Porgy (New York, 1927) by DuBose Heyward and Dorothy Heyward (1890-1961), after Porgy (1925) by DuBose Heyward

- 9 (3:53) Aria: "Summertime", with Cynthia Haymon, conducted by Andrew Davis

Benjamin Britten (1913-1976)

Peter Grimes (London, 1945), with a libretto by Montagu Slater (1902-1956) after The Borough (1810) by George Crabbe (1754-1832)

- 10 (7:52) Storm interlude, conducted by Andrew Davis

Introduction by Elisabeth Söderström

Richard Strauss (1864-1949)

Capriccio (Op. 85, Munich, 1942), with a libretto by Clemens Krauss (1893-1954) and Richard Strauss, based on a libretto by Stefan Zweig (1881-1942) developed by Joseph Gregor (1888-1960)

- 11 (23:14) Closing scene: "Kein Andres, das mir so im Herzen loht", with Felicity Lott, conducted by Bernard Haitink

Introduction by Sir Geraint Evans

Wolfgang Amadeus Mozart

Il dissoluto punito, ossia Il Don Giovanni ("The rake punished, or Don Giovanni", K. 527, Prague, 1787), with a libretto by Lorenzo da Ponte, after El burlador de Seville y convivado de piedra ("The trickster of Seville and the stone guest", ?1616) by Tirso de Molina (1579-1648)

- 12 (4:57) Duet (Don Giovanni and Zerlina): "Là ci darem la mano", with Ruggero Raimondi and Cynthia Haymon, conducted by Bernard Haitink

Introduction by George Christie

Idomeneo, re di Creta ossia Ilia e Idamante ("Idomeneo, King of Crete, or Ilia and Idamante", K. 366, Munich, 1781), with a libretto by Giambattista Varesco (1735-1805), after a French text by Antoine Danchet (1671-1748) which had been set to music by André Campra (1660-1744) as Idoménée (Paris, 1712)

- 13 (7:44) Chorus: "Nettuno s'onori", with the Glyndebourne Festival Chorus, conducted by Bernard Haitink

Introduction by George Christie

Le nozze di Figaro

- 14 (4:46) Overture, conducted by Andrew Davis, with fireworks and closing credits

== Personnel ==
=== Artists ===
- Janet Baker (b. 1933)
- Kim Begley, tenor
- Montserrat Caballé (1933-2018), soprano
- Geraint Evans (1922-1992)
- Cynthia Haymon (b. 1958), soprano
- Felicity Lott (b. 1947), soprano
- Benjamin Luxon (1937-2024), baritone
- Ruggero Raimondi (b. 1941), bass-baritone
- Elisabeth Söderström (1927-2009)
- Frederica von Stade (b. 1945), mezzo-soprano
- Martin Isepp (1930-2011), harpsichord continuo
- Glyndebourne Festival Chorus
- David Angus, chorus director
- Tina Gruenberg, concertmaster
- London Philharmonic Orchestra
- Andrew Davis (1944-2024), conductor
- Bernard Haitink (1929-2021), conductor

=== Glyndebourne Festival Opera personnel ===
- Anthony Whitworth-Jone, general director
- Stephen Cowin, stage manager
- Julie Crocker, stage manager
- Helen McCarthy, stage manager
- Thom Stanbury, stage manager
- Stephen Lawless, producer
- Paul Pyant, stage lighting
- Keith Benson, stage lighting

=== Broadcast personnel ===
- Val Fraser, outside broadcast stage manager
- Alex Thomas, outside broadcast stage manager
- Peter Hill, camera supervisor
- Barry Milne, vision supervisor
- Priscilla Hoadley, vision mixer
- Dierdre Allée, production assistant
- Jim Baker, engineering manager
- Graham Haines, audio engineer
- Dennis Butcher, television lighting
- Dennis Marks, executive producer
- Christopher Swann, director

== Critical reception ==
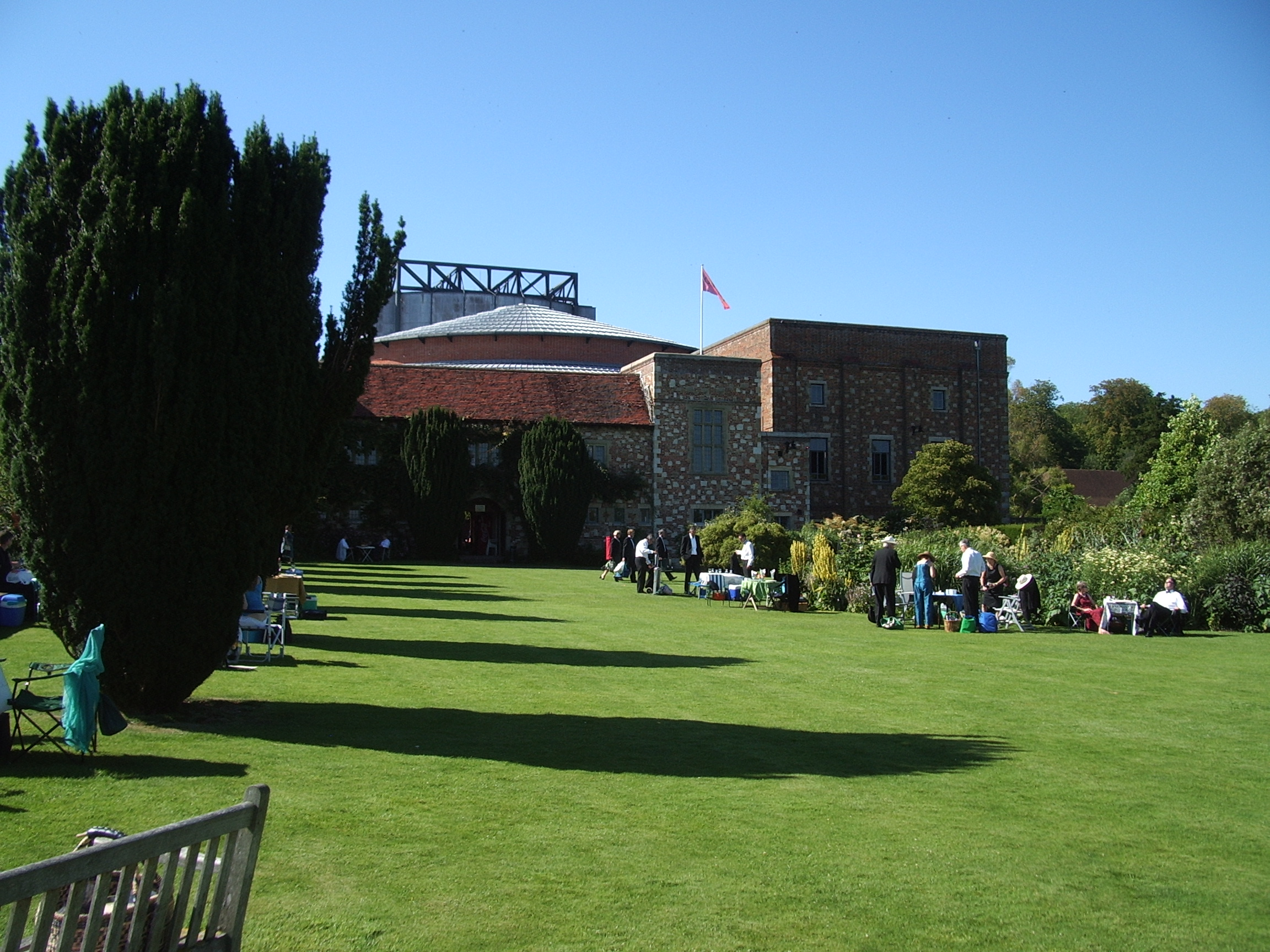
Glyndebourne's second opera house

J. B. Steane reviewed the gala on DVD in Gramophone in May 2004. In the words of its "urbane Master of Ceremonies", he wrote, the gala was "a moment of some nostalgia". Glyndebourne habitués who watched the disc would find themselves on a journey down memory lane. The critic Philip Hope-Wallace used to observe that an evening in Glyndebourne's opera house was "like living in a match-box with a bumble-bee", but many people were fond of the familiar old theatre, and would feel even warmer about it after a couple of hours with Arthaus's DVD.

The gala offered a menu of composers and compositions with which Glyndebourne had had some of its greatest successes, and presented artists who had played a particularly distinguished part in the festival's history. Janet Baker, Geraint Evans and Elisabeth Söderström participated in order to introduce other singers rather than to perform themselves, but their contributions were nevertheless very worthwhile.

The best section of the concert was the closing scene of Capriccio, sung by Felicity Lott with "Bernard Haitink conducting with undemonstrative skill and affection". Also difficult to forget was the scene from Il ritorno d'Ulisse in patria in which Ulysses and Penelope begin to heal the rift between them. Both of the Penelopes from Sir Peter Hall's production were in attendance, Janet Baker introducing the duet and her successor in the role, Frederica von Stade, "recreating her own lovely performance" of 1979.

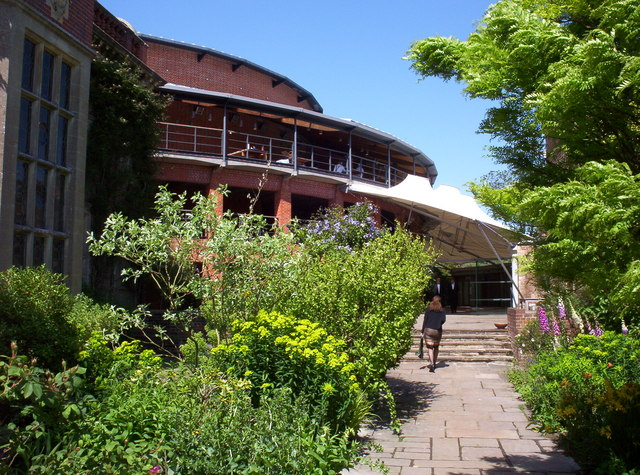
The approach to the theatre's entrance

Ruggero Raimondi was a singing actor who was invariably enjoyable, and his exposition of the mischief of "La calunnia" offered as much to the eye as the ear. Montserrat Caballé - visiting Sussex despite being thereby obliged to hire a private jet in order to get her to Barcelona in time for the opening ceremony of the Olympic Games - exhibited astonishing skill in her excerpt from Otello, although "the slow tempo, always seeming about to get slower, [weakened] the cohesion and underlying tension of the scene".

Sir George Christie was eloquent in his admiration for his company's chorus and the London Philharmonic Orchestra, and his encomium was no less than they deserved. The BBC too deserved praise for the expertise of their filming. Arthaus's DVD preserved a broadcast that was "carefully supervised with no time wasted, and a few occasions found to roam around the garden, watch the light fading on the walls of the house, and see the night sky lit up with celebratory fireworks".

The gala was also discussed in BBC Music Magazine, Billboard, Country Life, Paul Campion and Rosy Runciman's Glyndebourne recorded: sixty years of recording, 1934-1994 (1994) and Michael Kennedy and Julia Aries's Glyndebourne: a short history (2019).

== Broadcast and home media history ==
The gala was televised live in England by the BBC.

All home media releases of the gala present the same 111-minute edition of it, and all offer 4:3 colour video and stereo audio. In 1995, the gala was issued on VHS videocassette by Kultur Video in the United States and by Videolog in the United Kingdom. In 1997, Image Entertainment issued the gala in the United States on a Region 1 DVD with NTSC video and Dolby Digital audio. In 2004, Arthaus Musik issued the gala in Europe on a Region 2 and Region 5 DVD with PCM audio. Also in 2004, Geneon NBC issued the gala in Japan on a DVD with NTSC video and PCM audio.

== Gallery of artists ==
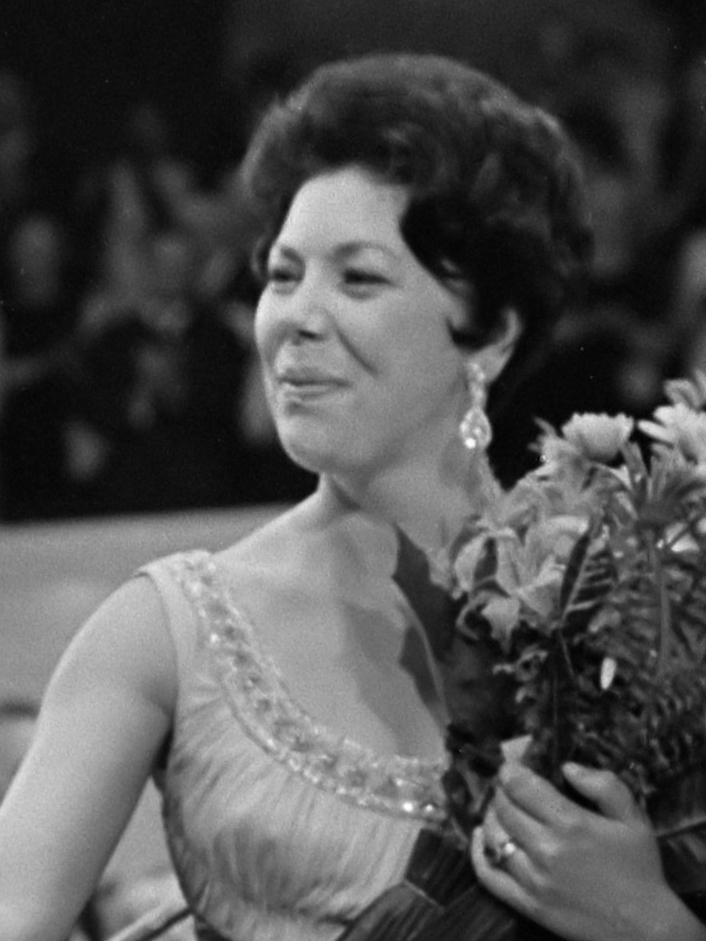
Janet Baker

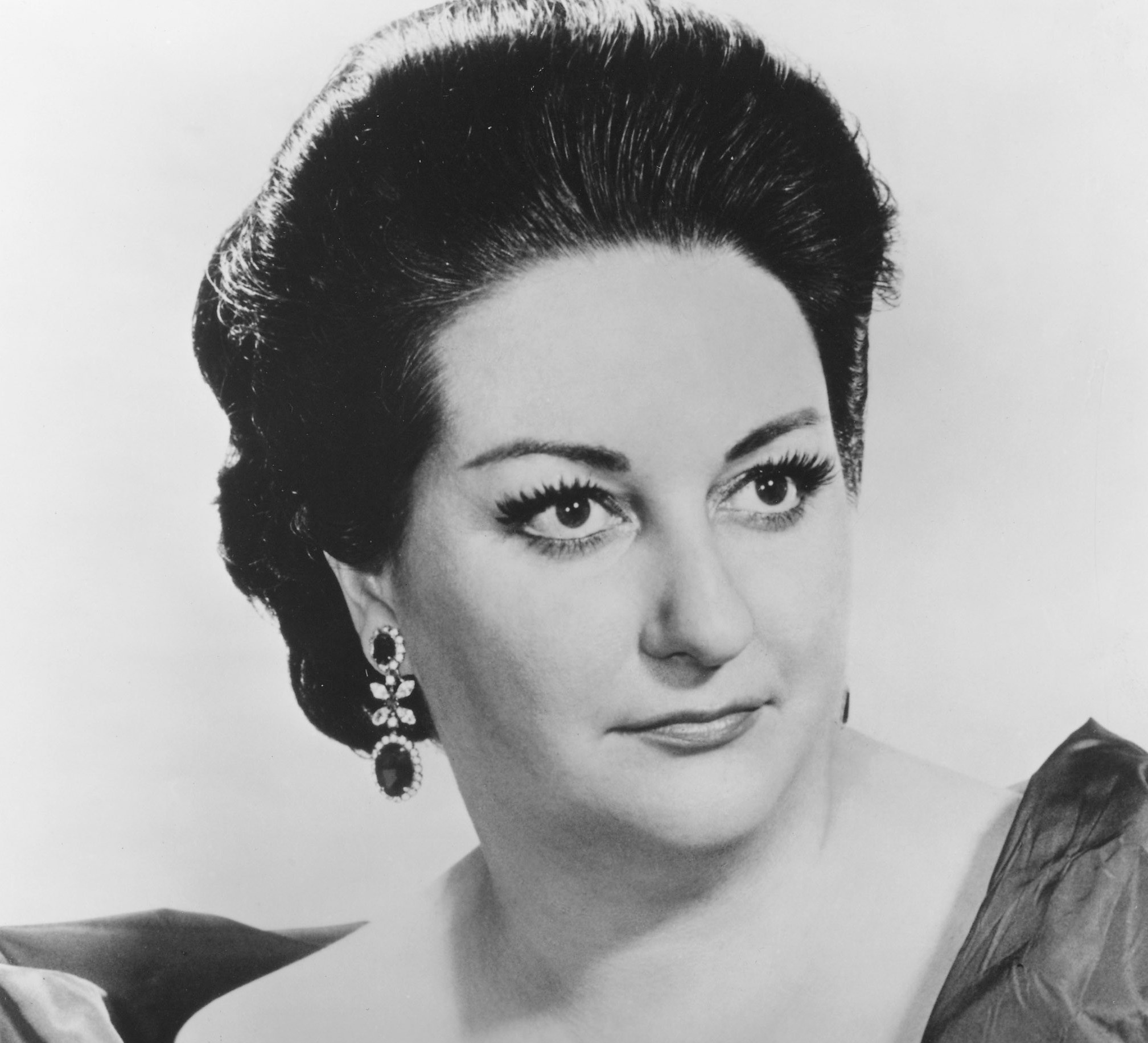
Montserrat Caballé

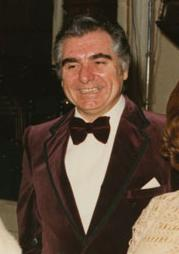
Geraint Evans

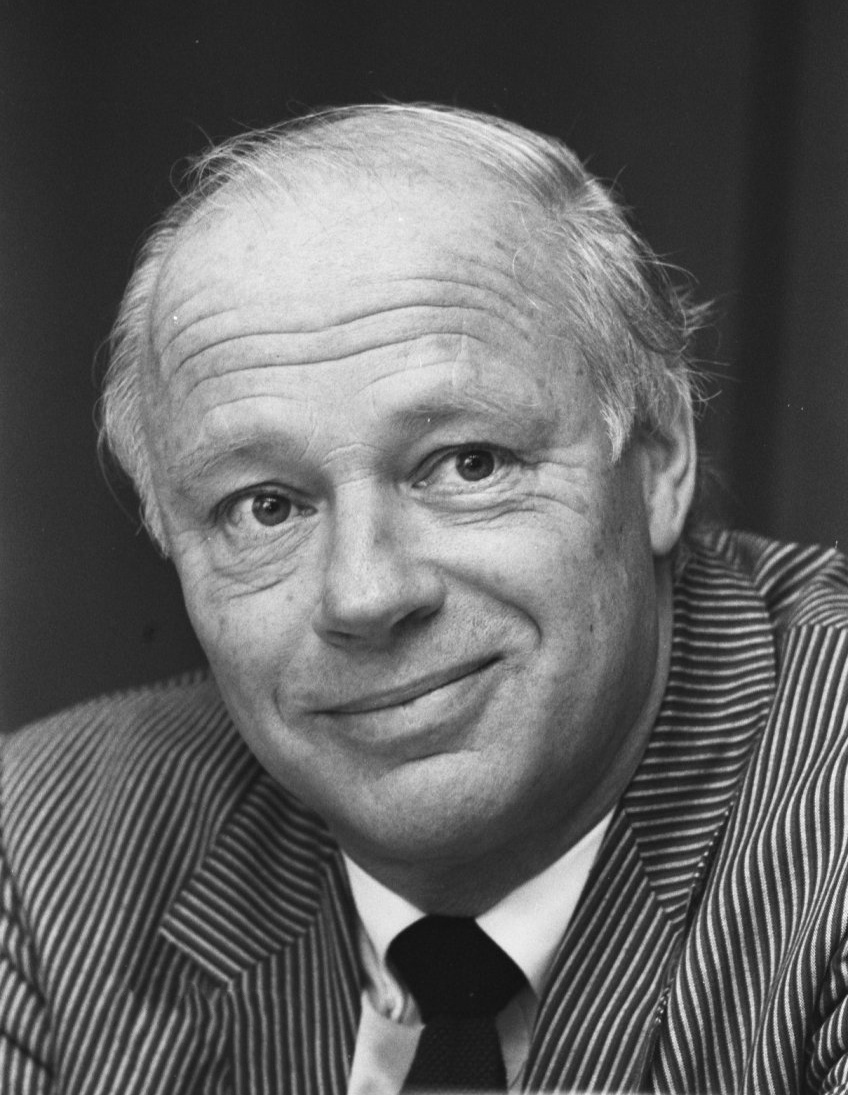
Bernard Haitink

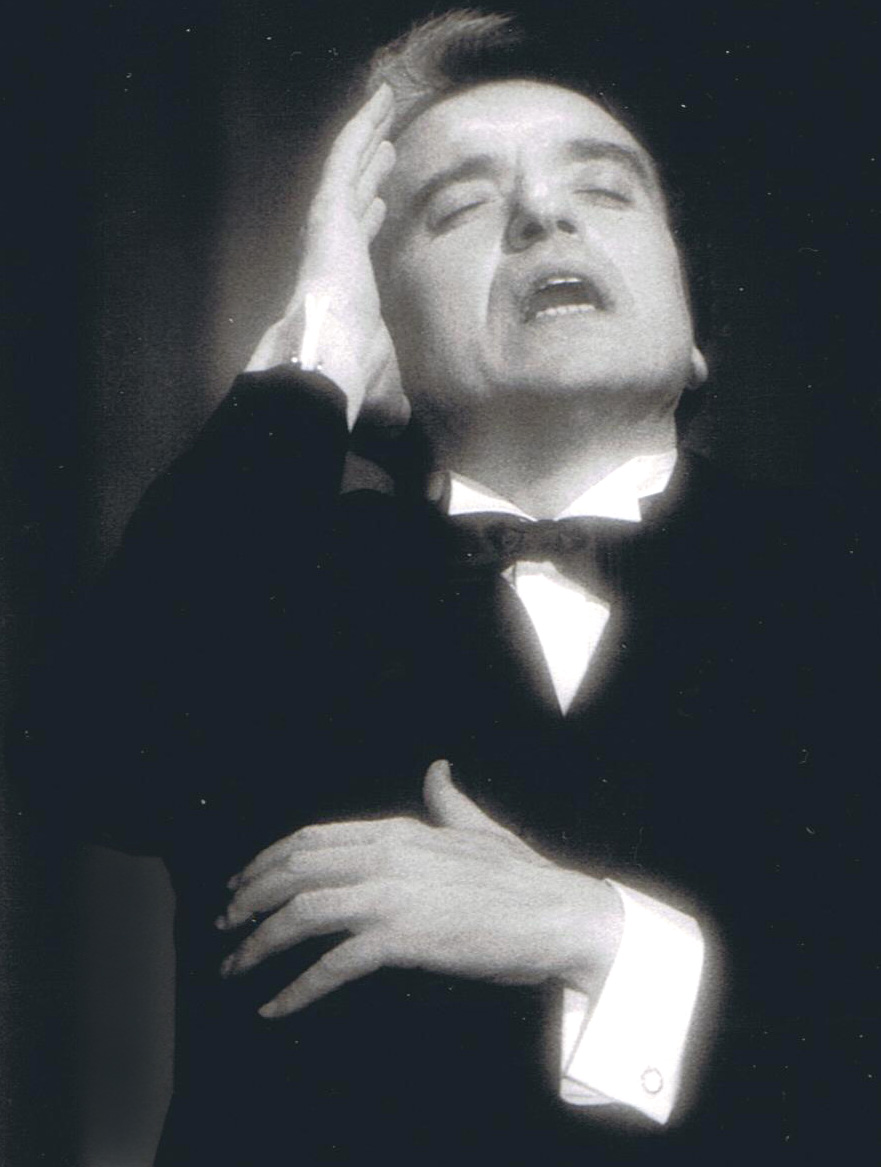
Ruggero Raimondi

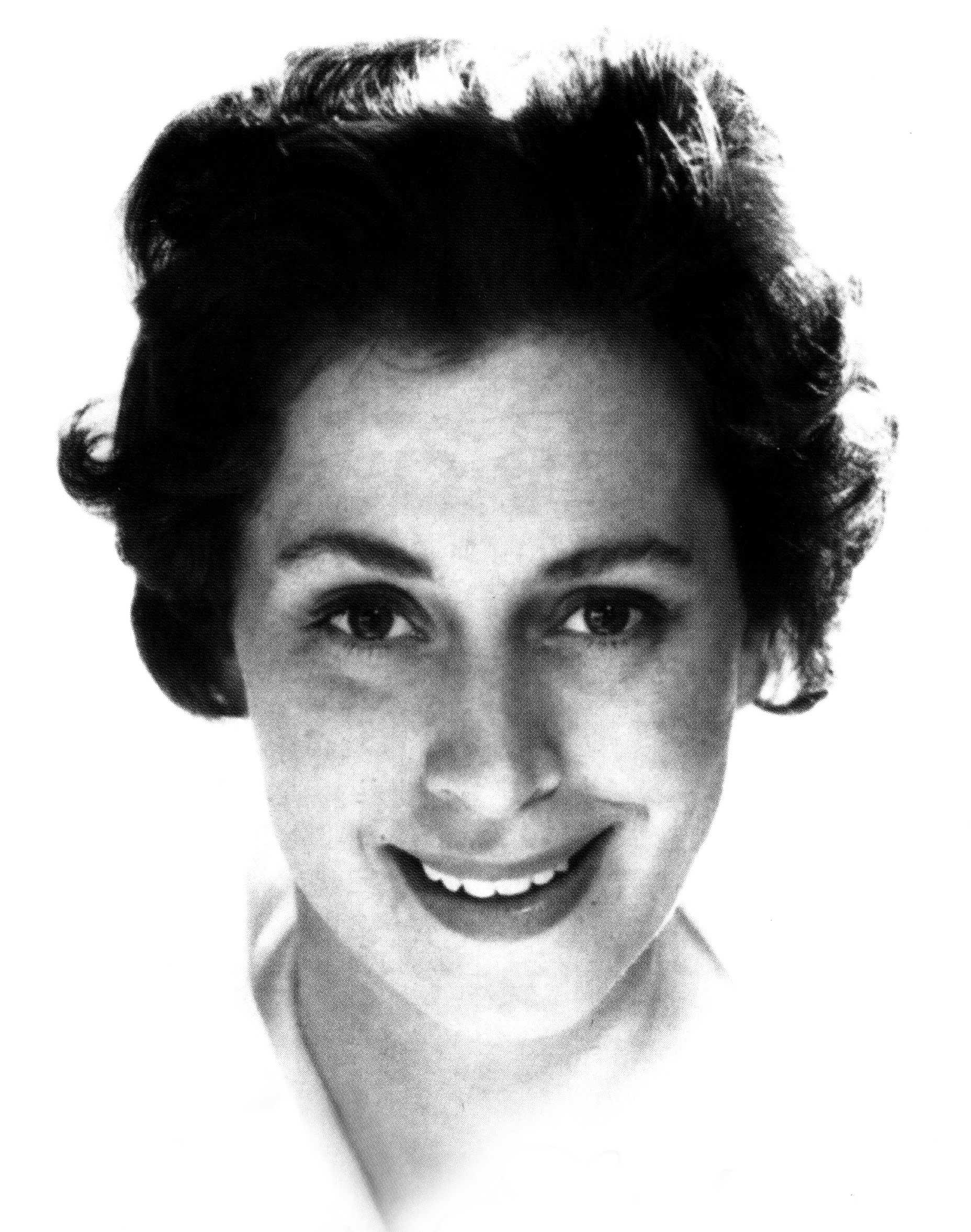
Elisabeth Söderström

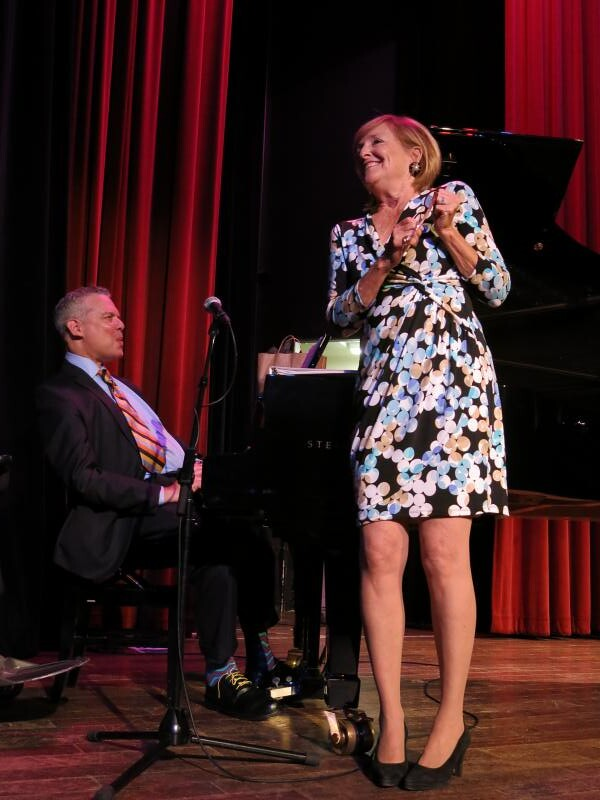
Frederica von Stade
