= Welsh National Opera =

Theatre company based in Cardiff

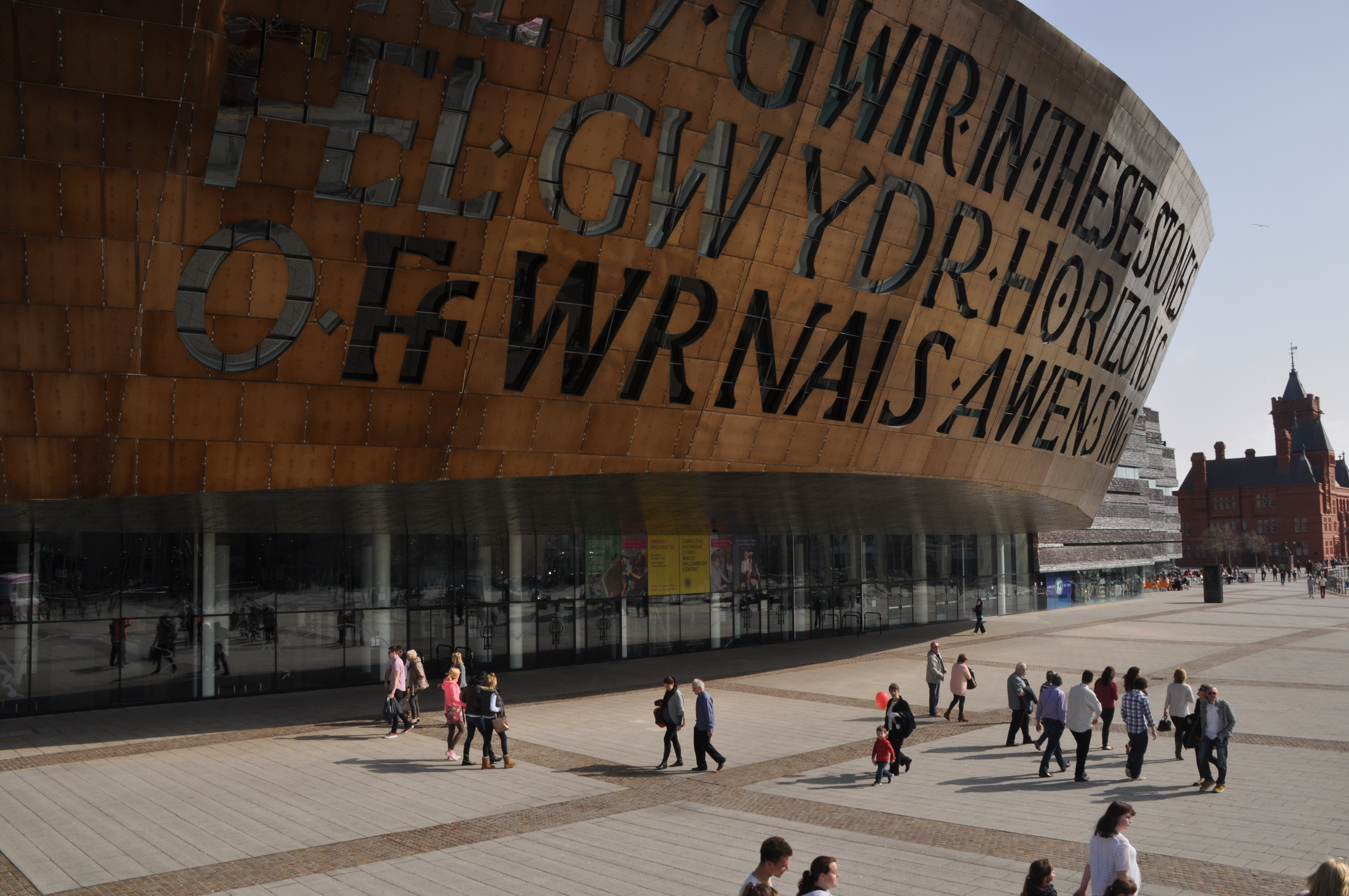
Wales Millennium Centre

Logo of Welsh National Opera

Welsh National Opera (WNO; Welsh: Opera Cenedlaethol Cymru) is an opera company based in Cardiff, Wales. The company presents eight operas a year in about 120 domestic and international performances. It has been described by The New York Times as "one of the finest operatic ensembles in Europe".

Launched in 1946 as a mainly amateur body, WNO had become an all-professional ensemble by 1973. Its season has grown from a single week of performances in Cardiff to a year-round operation with its own salaried chorus and orchestra. In 2004, the company moved to its first permanent headquarters, in the new Wales Millennium Centre, Cardiff Bay.

Besides Cardiff, the company most frequently performs in Llandudno in Wales and Bristol, Birmingham, Liverpool, Milton Keynes, Oxford, Plymouth, and Southampton in England.

Singers who have been associated with the company include Geraint Evans, Thomas Allen, Anne Evans, and Bryn Terfel. Guest artists from other countries have included Joan Hammond, Tito Gobbi and Elisabeth Söderström. Its conductors have included Sir Charles Mackerras, Reginald Goodall, James Levine and Pierre Boulez. The company has been led by Sarah Crabtree and Adele Thomas since January 2025 as Co-General Directors and CEOs.

== Background ==
Choral singing became increasingly popular in 19th-century Wales, principally owing to the rise of the eisteddfod as a symbol of its culture. The first Welsh National Opera Company was formed in 1890. A local newspaper commented that it was remarkable that "a race of people to whom vocal music is a ruling passion should not generations ago have established a permanent national opera". The company gave performances of operas by the Welsh composer Joseph Parry in Cardiff and on tour in Wales. The company, predominantly amateur with some professional guest singers from the London stage, gave numerous performances of Parry's Blodwen and Arienwen, composed in 1878 and 1890 respectively. An American tour was planned, but the company folded, and Parry's final opera, The Maid of Cefn Ydfa, was given at Cardiff by the Moody-Manners Opera Company in 1902.

A Cardiff Grand Opera Society ran from 1924 to 1934. It presented week-long annual seasons of popular operas including Faust, Carmen and Il trovatore, and like its predecessor was mainly an amateur body, with professional guest principals. Apart from the productions of these two enterprises, opera in Wales in the late 19th and early 20th centuries was generally presented by visiting companies from England.

In the 1930s Idloes Owen, a singing teacher and conductor, ran an amateur choir, the Lyrian Singers, based in Cardiff. In November 1941, together with John Morgan – a former Carl Rosa baritone – and Morgan's fiancée Helena Hughes Brown, Owen agreed to found the Lyrian Grand Opera Company, with Brown as secretary and Owen as conductor and general manager. They publicised their plan and held a general meeting of potential supporters in December 1943; at that meeting the name of the proposed organisation was changed to "Welsh National Opera Company". By January 1944 plans were far enough advanced for the company's first rehearsals to be held. Owen recruited a local businessman, W. H. (Bill) Smith (1894–1968), who agreed to serve as business manager. At first doubtful of the company's prospects, Smith became its dominant influence, leading fund-raiser, and chairman for twenty years from 1948. (Note: Smith had been secretary to the pre-war Cardiff Grand Opera Society, and when approached by Owen he was dubious that the proposed company was any likelier to survive than the old Society.)

== Early years ==
The new company made its debut at the Prince of Wales Theatre, Cardiff on 15 April 1946 with a double bill of Cavalleria rusticana and Pagliacci. The orchestra was professional, mostly drawn from members of the BBC Welsh Orchestra; all the singers were amateurs, except for Tudor Davies, a tenor well known at Covent Garden and Sadler's Wells, who sang Canio in Pagliacci. During the week-long season the new company also staged Faust, with Davies in the title role. Although nearing the end of his career he was a considerable box-office draw, and the company played to full houses. Nevertheless, the expense of a professional orchestra and the hire of costumes and scenery outweighed the box-office receipts, and the season made a small loss. Finance remained a recurring problem over the succeeding decades.

The sets were faded stock with years of amateur service behind them, there were one or two experienced guest principals … and a majority of local amateurs, stiff actors, sometimes vocally overparted, absurdly costumed, yet almost all of them ejecting the primeval essence of operatic enjoyment, a passion for and in singing.

— The Times on the early years of Welsh National Opera.

Although Owen was the conductor for the performances of Cavalliera rusticana, and remained as musical director of the company until 1952, his health was fragile and he conducted none of the company's other productions. His colleague, the chorus master, Ivor John, was in charge of the first season's Pagliacci and Faust.

In 1948 the organisation was registered as a limited company, and the Cardiff season was extended from one week to two. The following year the company gave its first performances in Swansea. The chorus featured 120 performers by this time.

The company's first few seasons attracted little attention from the British musical establishment, but by the early 1950s London papers began to take notice. Picture Post hailed the WNO's chorus as the finest in Britain. The Times also praised the chorus: "It has body, lightness, rhythmic precision, and, most welcome of all, unflagging and spontaneous freshness." By this time the company had expanded its repertoire to take in Carmen, La traviata, Madame Butterfly, The Tales of Hoffmann, The Bartered Bride and Die Fledermaus. The Times commented that Smith, Owen and their colleagues were "making history for Wales. The shackles of puritanism, which had kept this country from an art-form perfectly suited to its national talents and predilections (for histrionics and dressing-up are as natural to the Welsh as singing) had been broken for ever".

== Consolidating: 1950s and 60s ==
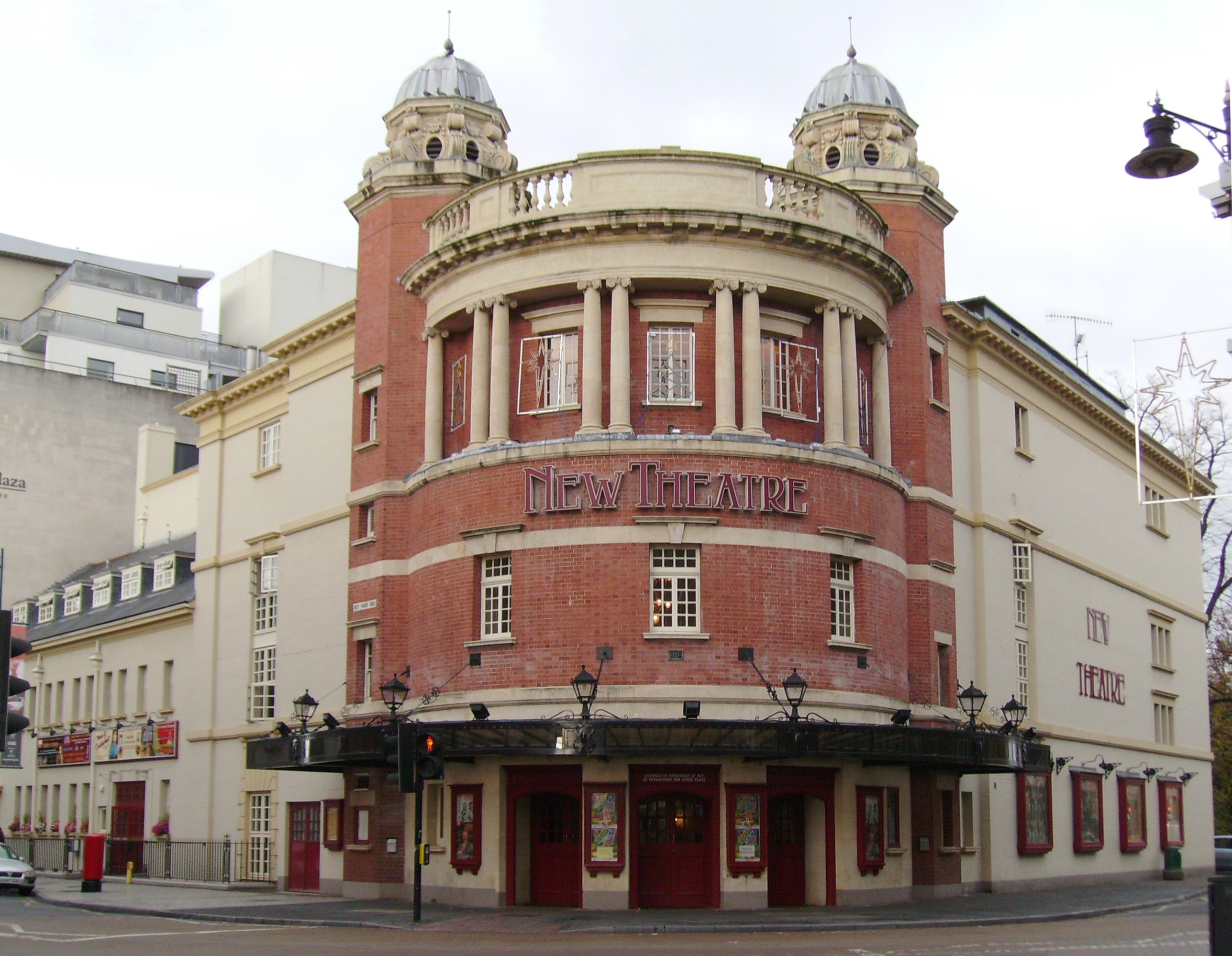
The New Theatre, WNO's Cardiff venue for 50 years from 1954

In 1952 the company moved its Cardiff venue to the Sophia Gardens Pavilion (built for the Festival of Britain), with the Bournemouth Municipal Orchestra as the company's orchestra, replacing the previous ad hoc ensemble. The Pavilion was acoustically mediocre and lacked an orchestra pit; two years later the company moved again, to the New Theatre where it played Cardiff seasons across the next fifty years. The 1952 season attracted particular interest because it included what was then a rarity: Verdi's Nabucco. The company built a reputation for staging seldom-seen Verdi works, including The Sicilian Vespers staged in the same year, I Lombardi in 1956, and The Battle of Legnano, under the shortened title The Battle, in 1960. The 1952 Nabucco was the WNO's first production for which costumes and scenery were specially designed (by Patrick Robertson) rather than hired.

In 1953 the company staged its first work by a Welsh composer: Menna by Arwel Hughes. The composer conducted, and the leads were sung by two professional guest stars, Richard Lewis and Elsie Morison. The same year marked WNO's first appearances outside Wales, playing a week at Bournemouth in April, and a week at Manchester in October, when The Manchester Guardian found the soloists first-rate but the chorus disappointing, in both Nabucco and Il trovatore. A reviewer in The Musical Times commented on potential difficulties in assembling the wholly amateur chorus for performances beyond daily travelling range of their day jobs. By the time of the company's first London season – a week at Sadler's Wells in 1955 – the chorus was judged to be "lively and exciting" (The Musical Times), "vibrant" and "moving" (The Times) and "joyous" (The Manchester Guardian). The second season at Sadler's Wells in the summer of 1956, included productions of Nabucco, I Lombardi and Lohengrin, achieving rave reviews. Kenneth Loveland of the South Wales Argus wrote a glowing piece under his byline 'Stroller' "Tonight, amongst working-class streets of the Angel, Islington, I was privileged to witness a body of men and women doing more for Wales than all your sounding harps...or tub thumping politicians".

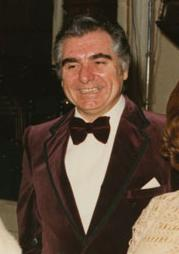
Geraint Evans, guest principal in 1966 and 1969

By the mid-1950s professional singers were cast in leading roles in most productions; they included Walter Midgley in Tosca and La bohème (1955), Raimund Herincx in Mefistofele (1957), Heather Harper in La traviata (1957), and Joan Hammond in Madame Butterfly (1958). A possibility of strengthening the professional element of the company was mooted in 1958, when a merger was proposed with the Carl Rosa Company, which was in financial difficulties. The proposal was not followed through and WNO continued independently while the Carl Rosa folded.

During the 1960s the company continued to widen its range. Its first Wagner production, Lohengrin, and its first Mozart, The Marriage of Figaro, were both performed in 1962, conducted by Charles Groves. Another Welsh opera, Hughes's Serch yw'r Doctor ("Love, the Doctor") was staged in 1960. The popular Italian repertoire remained the core of the annual seasons, mostly directed by the head of production, John Moody. Leading roles were taken by rising stars such as John Shirley-Quirk, Gwyneth Jones, Thomas Allen, Josephine Barstow and Margaret Price, the last of whom made her operatic debut with the company in 1962. Established singers guesting with the company included Geraint Evans who played the title role in Don Pasquale in 1966, and Ian Wallace in the same part the following year. Evans was also seen as Leporello in Don Giovanni in 1966 and as Falstaff in 1969.

The gradual switch from amateur to professional continued in 1968, when for the first time the chorus was supplemented by a smaller, professional group of singers; the mix of amateur and professional choristers continued over the next five years. At the end of the 1960s the main WNO company, now a year-round operation, consisted of 8 salaried principal singers, 57 guest soloists and a chorus of 90 amateurs and 32 professionals. As well as the Bournemouth players, the company engaged the Royal Liverpool Philharmonic, City of Birmingham Symphony and Ulster orchestras for different venues. In the last season of the decade 32 performances were given in Cardiff and 61 elsewhere in the UK. In addition to the main company, WNO maintained two smaller groups: one, with orchestra, toured Welsh towns, the other, consisting of 12 singers with piano, toured 79, mostly small, towns in Wales and England. (Note: The main company played in Birmingham, Bristol, Cardiff, Liverpool, Llandudno, Stratford-upon-Avon and Swansea, and the medium-sized group appeared at Aberystwyth, Haverfordwest, Rhyl and Wrexham.) WNO instituted its own training scheme for young singers during the decade.

== Fully professional: 1970s ==
In 1970 WNO stopped using the Bournemouth and other orchestras and established its own, known at first as the Welsh Philharmonia. Three years later the last amateur element of the company was removed when the chorus became fully professional. A further broadening of the repertoire took place in the 1970s: in 1971 WNO staged the first performances in Britain of Berg's Lulu, directed by Michael Geliot, who had succeeded Moody in 1969. In the view of Malcolm Boyd in The New Grove Dictionary of Opera, Geliot, "unpredictable and often controversial", largely shaped the company's style in the 1970s. In collaboration with the company's musical director James Lockhart, Geliot is credited by The Times with introducing new young singers and "directing a host of groundbreaking productions" before leaving in 1978. The critic Rodney Milnes wrote in 1975 about WNO's productions:

I have never seen, well, hardly ever, a pretentious, silly or seriously misguided production, and neither have I seen a dull one. … The company's greatest virtue is that its work is dedicated above all to the service of composers and audiences, and not to some abstract notion of "prestige" nor to the vanity or ambition of individuals, and in this it is almost unique.

In 1973 Geliot's WNO staging of Britten's Billy Budd with Allen in the title role was presented on a Swiss tour, and two years later it was given in Barcelona. The company returned to London with its participation in the Amoco Festival of Opera at the Dominion Theatre in 1979, presenting The Makropoulos Case, The Magic Flute, Ernani, Madame Butterfly, and Tristan and Isolde to capacity audiences.

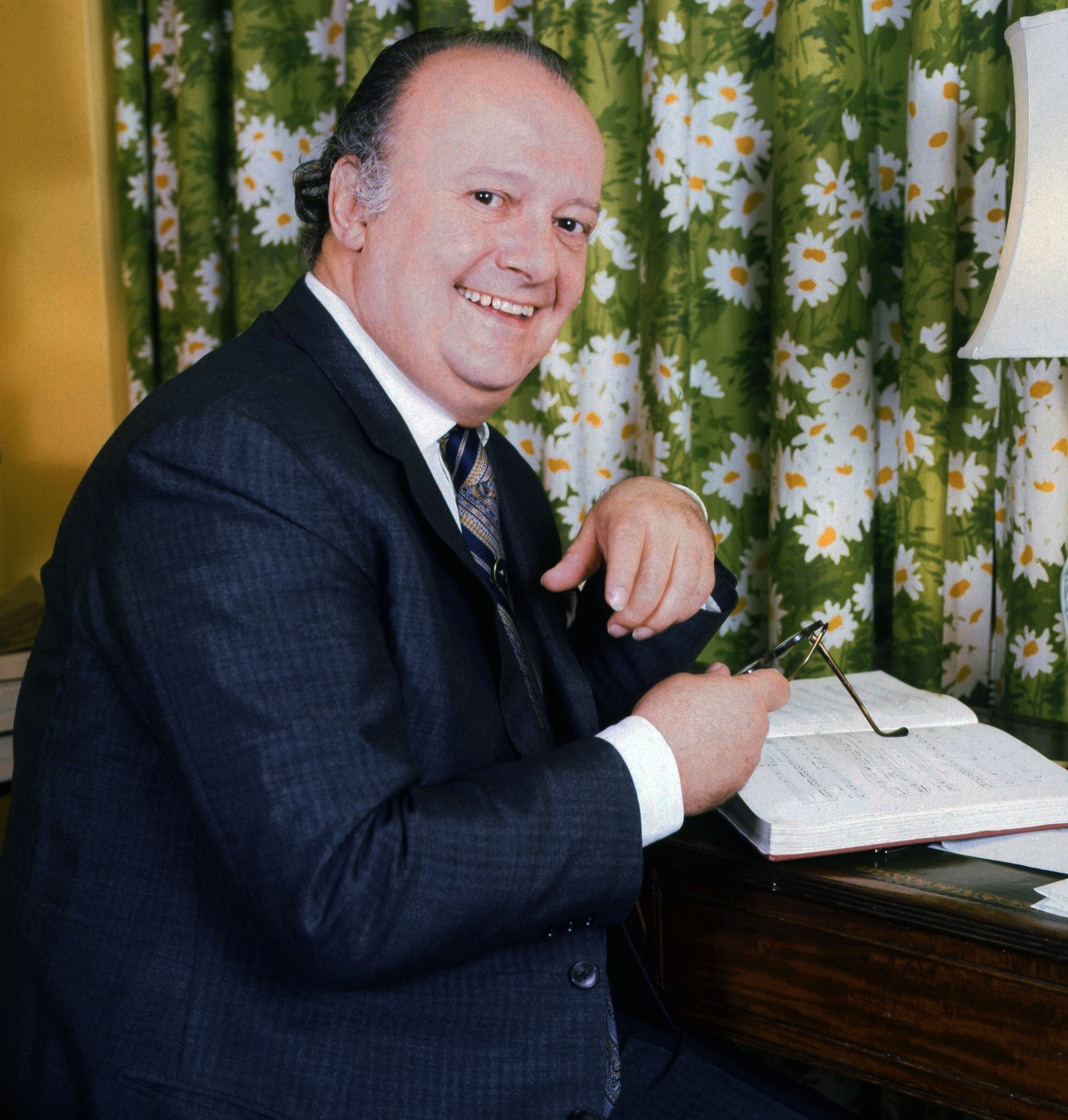
Tito Gobbi, WNO's Falstaff in 1972

The company's traditional preference for the Italian repertoire was partly redressed during the decade: productions include WNO's first staging of a Richard Strauss opera, Elektra, in 1978. A new Welsh work, Alun Hoddinott's The Beach of Falesá, was presented in 1974. In 1975, in co-production with Scottish Opera, WNO began a cycle of Janáček operas, directed by David Pountney. Beginning with Jenůfa, the cycle continued with The Makropoulos Case (1978), The Cunning Little Vixen (1980), Kátya Kabanová (1982) and From the House of the Dead (1982). (Note: These dates are those of the WNO stagings of the co-productions; the Scottish Opera stagings were in 1977, 1981, 1987, 1979 and 1987 respectively.)

Among the guest artists who appeared with the company in the 1970s were the baritone Tito Gobbi, as Falstaff (1972), the sopranos Elisabeth Söderström as Emilia in The Makropoulos Case (1978) and Anne Evans as Senta in The Flying Dutchman (1972), and the conductors James Levine (Aida, 1970) and Reginald Goodall (Tristan and Isolde, 1979).

In the late 1970s WNO combined with the Cardiff-based Welsh Drama Company, becoming the Welsh National Opera and Drama Company. The work of the drama company came under continued criticism, the Welsh Arts Council cut its grant, and the partnership ended in 1979 with the formal closure of the Welsh Drama Company.

== 1980s ==
During the 1980s WNO continued to expand in scope. Handel (Rodelinda, 1981) and Martinů (The Greek Passion, 1981) were added to the company's repertoire, and in 1983 Das Rheingold was staged in the WNO's first Ring cycle, followed by the other three operas of the cycle over the next two years. Das Rheingold, Siegfried and Götterdämmerung were conducted by the company's musical director, Richard Armstrong; Die Walküre (1984) was conducted by Goodall; it was seen as a coup for the company to secure his services – he was described by The Guardian as the greatest living Wagnerian conductor – but the casting of the whole cycle was criticised for some serious weaknesses among the principal singers, and reviewers were generally unimpressed by Göran Järvefelt's production.

The chief executive, Brian McMaster, did not appoint a replacement to Geliot as principal director during the 1980s, preferring to engage guest producers. Boyd mentions Andrei Serban's Eugene Onegin (1980) among the successes and Lucian Pintilie's Carmen (1983) and Ruth Berghaus's Don Giovanni (1984) as productions that received more mixed responses. Sir Charles Mackerras, the conductor for Don Giovanni, was open in his contempt for Berghaus's production. Harry Kupfer's Fidelio (1981) was condemned by The Daily Telegraph as "a piece of Marxist polemic" making "political sport" of Beethoven's work. McMaster was thought by some too inclined to favour radical eastern European directors: Jonathan Miller, a leading English director, commented that he did not intend to take Bulgarian nationality, although it was "a must before Brian pays any attention".

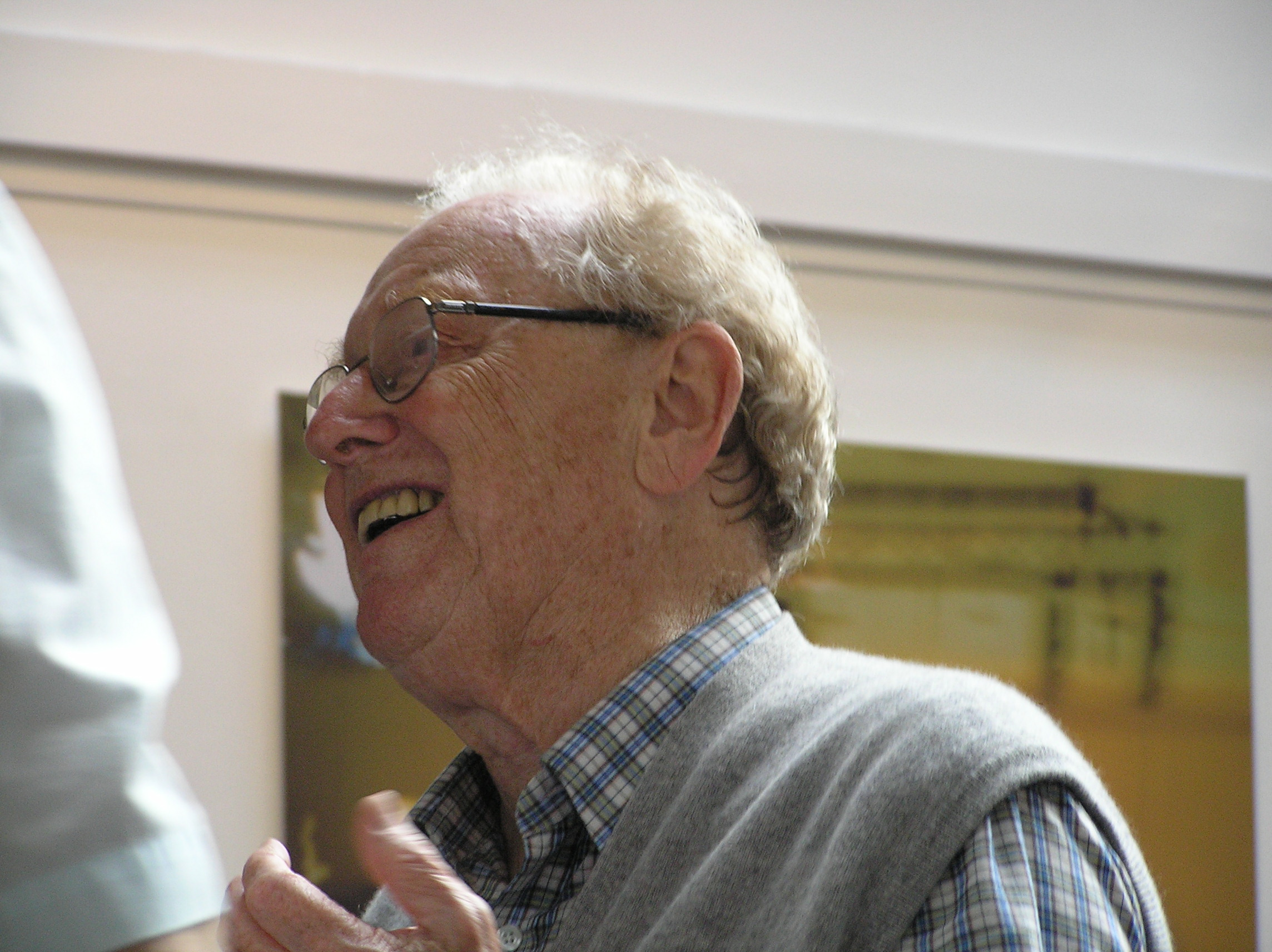
Sir Charles Mackerras (pictured in 2005) became musical director in 1986.

Armstrong stepped down in 1986 after thirteen years as musical director; he was succeeded by Mackerras, whose association with the company dated back more than thirty years. (Note: Mackerras had first worked with WNO in 1950, when as a young conductor he had been in charge for The Tales of Hoffmann. At that time he privately wrote of "an atrocious orchestra ... shockingly out of tune" and the singers "mainly amateur and unreliable".) Among the features of his six-year tenure was an increasing use of surtitles for performances not given in English. In the company's early days, all operas had been sung in English, but as more international stars began to appear as guest principals the language policy had to be reconsidered: few of the leading names in world opera were interested in relearning their roles in English. WNO steered a middle course between the practices of the two main London companies; after the 1960s The Royal Opera had generally given operas in the original language, and English National Opera was committed to opera in English. WNO's practice varied, after its early years. Examples from the 1980s include Wagner's Tristan und Isolde sung in German, and the Ring in English; and Verdi's The Force of Destiny given in English and Otello in Italian. Mackerras was a strong advocate of performance in the original language, with surtitles: "I can't imagine a greater advance for opera. … What a gift! It's like Siegfried understanding the woodbird." (Note: In Wagner's Siegfried, the eponymous hero, after tasting the blood of a dragon, is suddenly able to understand what a friendly bird is trying to tell him.)

== 1990s ==
McMaster resigned in 1991, having led the company to international status, with performances at La Scala, Milan; the Metropolitan Opera, New York; and in Tokyo. One of the last legacies of his tenure was the 1992 production of Debussy's Pelléas et Mélisande, directed by Peter Stein and conducted by Pierre Boulez. The New York Times called WNO "one of the finest operatic ensembles in Europe" and noted that the first night of the Debussy work, in Cardiff, "attracted 80 critics from all over the United Kingdom and the Continent ... the most prestigious, intensely awaited event of the British operatic season." The production was given at the Théâtre du Châtelet, Paris, a few weeks afterwards.

McMaster was followed as chief executive by Matthew Epstein, whose three years in charge (1991–94) were described in a 2006 study by Paul Atkinson as "a less happy and less successful period". Epstein was replaced by Anthony Freud, under whom, according to Atkinson, productions became "consistently strong, musically well prepared, intelligently staged and well cast." Mackerras was succeeded in 1992 by Carlo Rizzi, who was music director at the time of WNO's golden jubilee in 1996. When the occasion was marked with a new production of the "Cav and Pag" double bill that had launched the company in 1946, the BBC commented that WNO was "one of the most respected opera companies in the world". In The Observer, Michael Ratcliffe called the company "the most popular, populist and consistently successful arts organisation ever to come out of Wales ... with the loyalty and affection of audiences in Cardiff and across England … 'The people's opera' is not a myth. It happened here." The jubilee celebrations were overshadowed by the collapse of a plan for a purpose-built home for the company, the Cardiff Bay Opera House.

During the 1990s WNO made its Proms debut, with a complete performance of Mozart's Idomeneo, conducted by Mackerras in 1991. The company played three short seasons at the Royal Opera House, Covent Garden in the mid-1990s, featuring Tristan und Isolde and La favorita in 1993, The Yeomen of the Guard in 1995, and The Rake's Progress and the jubilee double bill of Cavalleria rusticana and Pagliacci in 1996. (Note: The performances of The Yeomen of the Guard (a co-production with the Glimmerglass Festival), were the first staging of any Savoy Opera at Covent Garden, and gained WNO praise at the Royal Opera's expense for ending the century-long absence of Gilbert and Sullivan from the Royal Opera House.) In 1996 WNO commissioned Sir Peter Maxwell Davies to write an opera for the occasion of the company's 50th anniversary. The resulting opera was The Doctor of Myddfai, whose libretto written by David Pountney and included Welsh-language songs, based on a 12th-century folk tale. It premiered on 10 July 1996 at the North Wales Theatre in Llandudno with following performances in 1996. It was designed by Sue Huntley and Donna Muir.

== 21st century ==
The company entered the new millennium in a state of some turmoil. A financial crisis had led to redundancies in the orchestra and the curtailment of the touring schedule; the conservative works chosen for 2001–02 were condemned by the press as "the dullest programme in recent memory"; and Rizzi was about to be replaced by a young and untried successor, Tugan Sokhiev. Rizzi had gained great respect and affection during his nine-year term as musical director; his successor's reign was brief and unhappy. Having taken up post in 2003, Sohkiev resigned precipitately the following year. Rizzi agreed to reorganise his schedule, and, to public and critical acclaim, returned to the musical directorship in time to prepare the company for its long-awaited move into a permanent base in Cardiff.

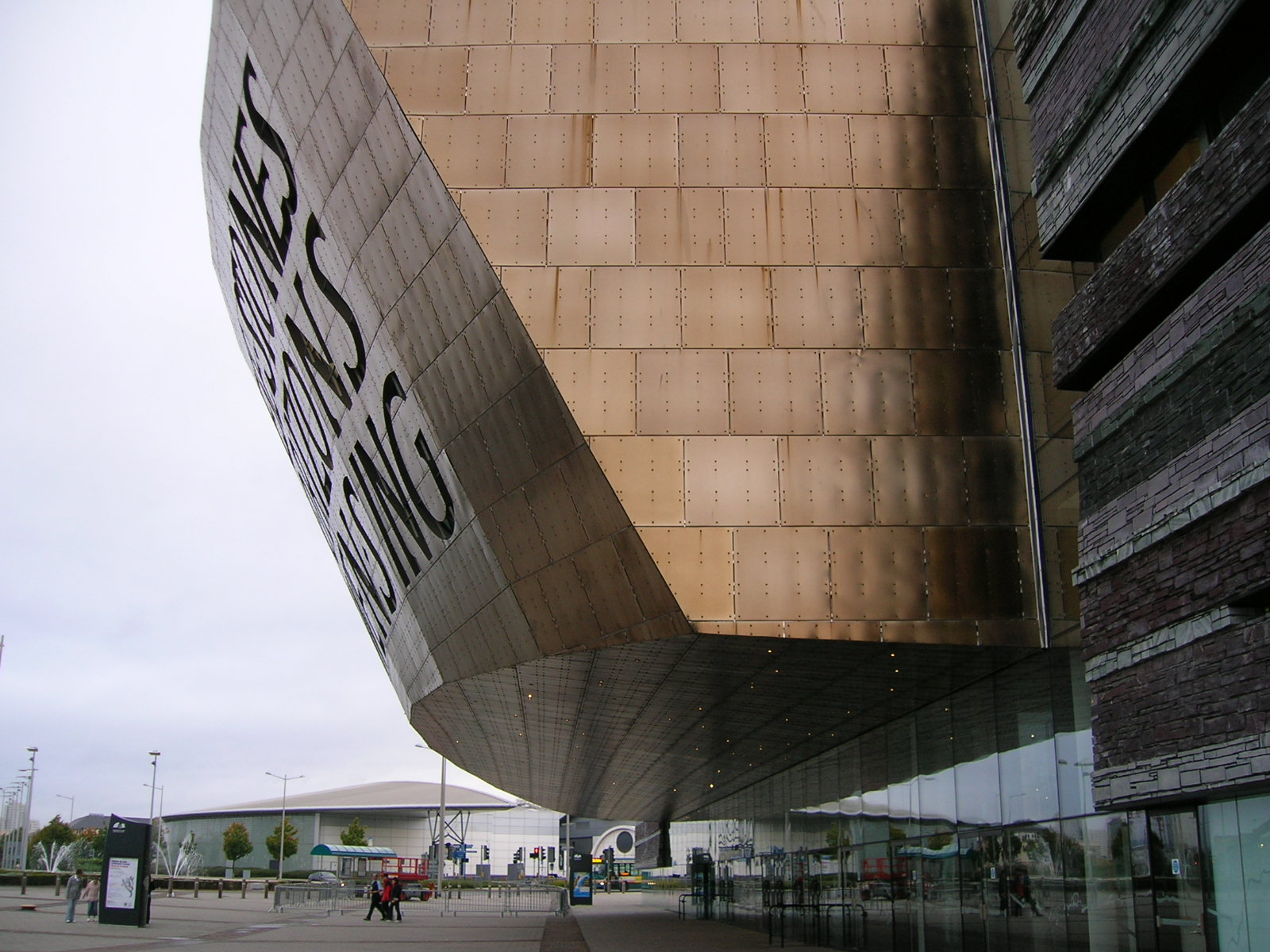
Welsh Millennium Centre, Cardiff, WNO's home base since 2004

After the collapse of the Cardiff Bay Opera House scheme, a new project, the Wales Millennium Centre, met with more success. The necessary consents and funding were obtained, and work began in 2002 on a new multipurpose arts centre on the Cardiff Bay site. The centre included a 1,900-seat theatre, which, among other uses, became WNO's home base from 2004, with its own rehearsal space and offices in the complex.

In the first decade of the 21st century WNO gave more than 120 performances a year, with a repertoire, generally, of eight full-scale operas. Its regular audience figures totalled over 150,000 annually, in ten principal venues, three of them in Wales and seven in England. (Note: The ten venues were Cardiff, Swansea and Llandudno in Wales and Bristol, Birmingham, Liverpool, Oxford, Milton Keynes, Plymouth and Southampton in England.) During this period the company was criticised for being insufficiently Welsh. A local politician, Adam Price, said that WNO ought to have a Welsh musical director; Alun Hoddinott said in 2004, "WNO has put on perhaps four or five Welsh operas over 20 years. ... They just seem to have an anti-Welsh music bias. I am sad that they do not do something for Welsh composers, especially young ones." A more positive view of WNO came from Scotland, where the two main newspapers, The Scotsman and The Herald, greeted a visit from the company in 2005 with enthusiastic praise, contrasting the flourishing of opera in Wales with its neglect by politicians in Scotland and the consequent decline of Scottish Opera. In 2010 WNO commissioned Gair ar Gnawd ("Word on Flesh"), by Pwyll ap Siôn and Menna Elfyn, with words in Welsh, described as "a contemporary story about Wales today ... inspired by the translation of the Bible".

It's a long haul, if you go by the clock – into the theatre at four, out at ten – but if you go by the exhilaration surging through your veins during this Welsh National Opera triumph, it's an extended moment of operatic bliss that you never want to end.

— Richard Morrison in The Times on WNO's 2010 Die Meistersinger.

From 2006 to 2011, the chief executive (titled "artistic director") was John Fisher. His term overlapped with that of Lothar Koenigs, who was music director from 2009 to 2016. A highlight of this period was the 2010 production of Die Meistersinger, produced by Richard Jones, with Bryn Terfel as Hans Sachs.

In 2011, David Pountney was appointed to succeed Fisher as chief executive. He had worked with the company since the 1970s, most recently on a 2006 The Flying Dutchman with Terfel which was set in space. In 2013 he programmed a trilogy of operas set in Tudor England: Donizetti's Anna Bolena, Maria Stuarda and Roberto Devereux, with another trilogy the following year, on the theme of fallen women – Puccini's Manon Lescaut, Henze's Boulevard Solitude and Verdi's La traviata. For 2016 Pountney scheduled another trilogy, this time on the theme of Figaro, consisting of Mozart's The Marriage of Figaro and Rossini's The Barber of Seville and a new work, Figaro Gets a Divorce with music by Elena Langer and libretto by Pountney.

In September 2015, WNO announced the appointment of Tomáš Hanus as its next music director, taking office for the 2016–17 season. Simultaneously, Carlo Rizzi was named the company's conductor laureate, with immediate effect. From 2019 to 2023, Aidan Lang was general director of the company. In December 2023, WNO announced Christopher Barron as interim general director, effective January 2024 to guide the company during a period of change as a result of simultaneous funding cuts from Arts Council England and Arts Council Wales in 2022 and 2023 respectively. Barron remained in the post until September 2024. In July 2024, WNO announced the appointments of Adele Thomas and Sarah Crabtree as co CEOs / General Directors, effective January 2025.

== Recordings ==
Although the chorus and orchestra of Welsh National Opera have appeared on many commercial recordings, often featuring regular WNO soloists, there have been few sets, either audio or video, of the company's own productions. Among those are Tristan und Isolde conducted by Goodall (1981), Pelléas et Mélisande conducted by Boulez (1992), The Yeomen of the Guard, conducted by Mackerras (1995), (Note: Substantially the same forces also recorded four other Gilbert and Sullivan operas – Trial by Jury (1995), H.M.S. Pinafore (1994), The Pirates of Penzance (1993) and The Mikado (1991), but these sets were not made in conjunction with WNO stage productions, the company not having staged the works.) The Doctor of Myddfai conducted by Armstrong (1998), and Ariodante conducted by Ivor Bolton, directed by David Alden (1999). The BBC made a studio video recording of a WNO cast in Katya Kabanova, conducted by Armstrong in 1982.

The WNO chorus and orchestra have been engaged for studio opera recordings unconnected with the company's productions, including Hamlet (1983), Norma (1984), Anna Bolena (1987), Ernani (1987) and Adriana Lecouvreur (1988) conducted by Richard Bonynge, Faust (1993) and Katya Kabanova (1994) conducted by Rizzi; and Gloriana (1993), Eugene Onegin (1994) and Jenůfa (2004) conducted by Mackerras. For the WNO jubilee in 1996, Decca drew on some of its studio recordings for a celebratory CD set with contributions from many soloists who had appeared onstage with the company and some who had not, the latter including Joan Sutherland, Luciano Pavarotti, Montserrat Caballé and Thomas Hampson. The orchestra of WNO has made studio recordings of non-operatic music by Elgar, Delius, Coleridge-Taylor and George Lloyd, and several sets of traditional Welsh songs and crossover music.

== Music directors ==
- Idloes Owen (1943–1952)
- Leo Quayle (1952–1953)
- Frederick Behrend (1953–1955)
- Vilém Tauský (1955)
- Warwick Braithwaite (1956–1961)
- Charles Groves (1961–1963)
- Bryan Balkwill (1963–1966)
- James Lockhart (1968–1973)
- Richard Armstrong (1973–1986)
- Sir Charles Mackerras (1987–1992)
- Carlo Rizzi (1992–2001)
- Tugan Sokhiev (2003–2004)
- Carlo Rizzi (2004–2007)
- Lothar Koenigs (2009–2016)
- Tomáš Hanus (2016–present)

Source: Oxford Dictionary of Music (1943–2009) and WNO (2009–16).

== Awards ==
Welsh National Opera has been nominated for, or won nearly every UK opera prize, including winning the Olivier Award in 1998 and in 1999. The Royal Philharmonic Society awarded its Music Award for Outstanding Achievement in Opera in 1999, 2000 and 2001, giving the company the distinction as the only arts organisation to have won the Award for three consecutive years. WNO's production of Pelléas and Mélisande (1992) won the International Classical Music Awards. Phyllida Lloyd's production of Poulenc's The Carmelites for WNO won the Royal Philharmonic Society Music Award for Outstanding Achievement in Opera in 1999, winning jointly with ENO as co-producers. The production of The Coronation of Poppea in 1997 by David Alden won WNO more awards than any other production: winning, the Evening Standard Award, the Royal Philharmonic Society and the Barclays Theatre Awards.

== Patrons ==
In 1982, WNO gained its first patron in Diana, Princess of Wales. As patron she attended many gala concerts in New Theatre, Cardiff; Dominion Theatre, London; Royal Opera House, Covent Garden; Brooklyn Academy of Music, New York and in 1984 she opened the new purpose-built headquarters, Princess of Wales Building in John Street, Cardiff. Her attendance at a performance by WNO in New York in 1989 caused much excitement and for road repairs to be immediately carried out. Their visit was seen in an episode of episode 10 'War', series 4 of The Crown. When in 1996 Princess Diana resigned as patron, WNO welcomed HRH Charles Prince of Wales as their new patron.

== See also ==
- After Aida
- List of opera houses
- Lists of opera companies

== Notes, references and sources ==
=== Sources ===
- Atkinson, Paul (2006). Everyday Arias: An Operatic Ethnography. Lanham, Maryland: AltaMira Press. ISBN 978-0-7591-0139-5.
- Bassett, Peter (2003). The Nibelung's Ring: A Guide to Wagner's Der Ring des Nibelungen. Kent Town, S Australia: Wakefield Press. ISBN 978-1-86254-624-0.
- Dann, John (2018). A Welsh Uncle, Memories of Tom Morgan 1898–1957. Peterborough. ISBN 978-178456-597-8.
- Fawkes, Richard (1986). Welsh National Opera. London: MacRae. ISBN 978-0-86203-184-8.
- Forbes, Elizabeth; et al. (1976). Welsh National Opera: 30th Anniversary. Cardiff: WNO. OCLC 222309358.
- Gilbert, Susie (2009). Opera for Everybody. London: Faber and Faber. ISBN 978-0-571-22493-7.
- Goodman, Lord; Lord Harewood (1969). A Report on Opera and Ballet in the United Kingdom, 1966–69. London: Arts Council of Great Britain. OCLC 81272.
- Griffel, Margaret Ross (2013). Operas in English: A Dictionary. Lanham, Maryland: Scarecrow Press. ISBN 978-0-8108-8272-0.
- Kennedy, Michael; Joyce Bourne Kennedy; Tim Rutherford-Johnson (2013). The Oxford Dictionary of Music (sixth ed.). Oxford: Oxford University Press. ISBN 978-0-19-957854-2.
- Lebrecht, Norman (2001). Covent Garden: The Untold Story. Boston: Northeastern University Press. ISBN 978-1-55553-488-2.
- Simeone, Nigel; John Tyrrell (2015). Charles Mackerras. Woodbridge: Boydell Press. ISBN 978-1-84383-966-8.
