= Independent Society of Musicians =

Organisation in the UK and Ireland

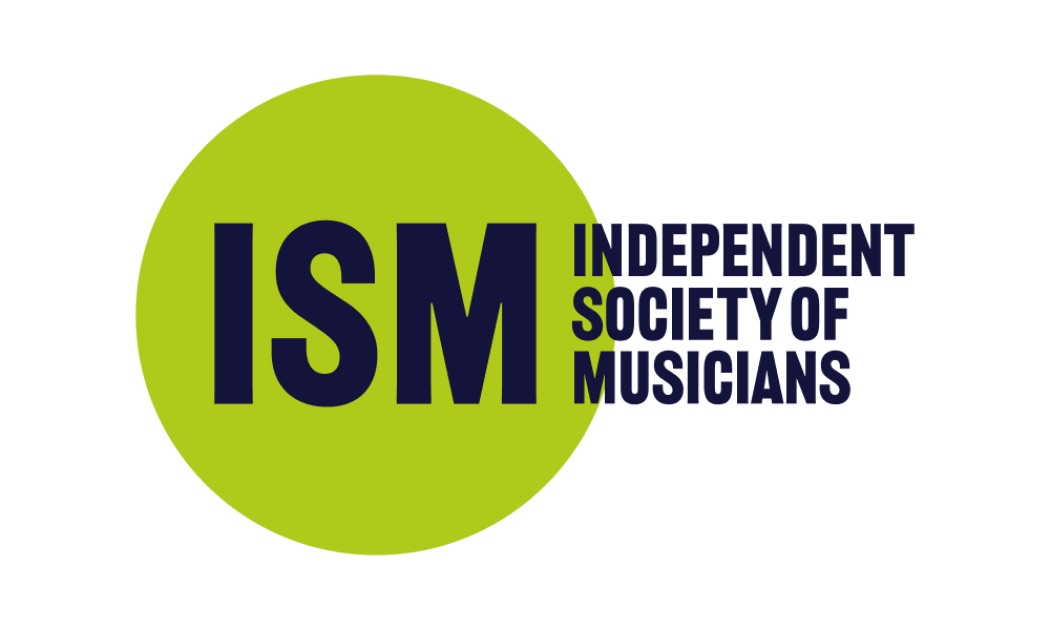
- Type: Professional Body
- Industry: Music
- Founded: July 25, 1882; 144 years ago
- Headquarters: London, United Kingdom
- Area served: United Kingdom and Ireland
- Key people: Deborah Annetts (CEO); Nicky Spence (President 2024-25)
- Website: www.ism.org

The Independent Society of Musicians (ISM) is the UK and Ireland's professional body for musicians representing over 11,000 individuals across all areas of the music industry. The ISM is also a subject association for music education and is an independent non profit-making organisation.

== History ==
The ISM was founded in 1882 to promote the importance of music and protect the rights of those working within music. It is an independent, not-for-profit membership organisation which has almost 11,000 individual members and over 180 corporate members. It protects and supports its members by providing them with expert advice, insurance and specialist services as well as access to a community of like-minded professionals and the status that comes with being a member of a professional body. Originally called the Incorporated Society of Musicians, it changed its name in October 2022 to coincide with its 140th anniversary.

== Members ==
The ISM has a membership of over 11,000 music professionals including performers, composers and songwriters, music teachers, music administrators, music technology professionals and portfolio musicians, and provides discounted membership for students and early career musicians. Members may use appropriate post-nominal letters. FISM (Fellow), MISM (Member), SMISM (Student Member). Members may also apply for ISM Registered Private Teacher status, and apply for a DBS, PVG or Access NI.

The ISM's current members include Sir Simon Rattle, Sir Mark Elder, Sir James Galway, Dame Felicity Lott, Dame Judith Weir, Betty Roe MBE, Julian Lloyd Webber, Andy Boyd, Paul Harris, Gerald Finley, and Craig Ogden.

=== Presidents ===
- 1921-22: Arthur Mann
- 1922-23: Allen Gill
- 1923-24: Sir Landon Ronald
- 1924-25: Sir Donald Tovey
- 1925-26: Sir Walford Davies KCVO OBE
- 1926-28: E Markham Lee
- 1928-29: Sir Adrian Boult CH
- 1929-30: Sir Hugh Allen GCVO
- 1930-31: Sir John McEwen
- 1931-32: Bernard Johnson
- 1932-33: Harry Plunket Greene
- 1933-34: W Gillies Whittaker
- 1934-35: Sir Edward Bairstow
- 1935-36: Sir Stanley Marchant, CVO
- 1936-37: Sir Percy Buck
- 1937-38: Robert Forbes CBE
- 1938-39: Sir Thomas Beecham, Bart CH
- 1939-40: Sir Hugh Allen GCVO
- 1940-41: Frederic Austin
- 1941-45: Sir George Dyson KCVO
- 1945-46: Sir Thomas Armstrong
- 1946-47: Sir Ernest Bullock CVO
- 1947-48: Harold Craxton OBE
- 1948-49: Henry Havergal OBE
- 1949-50: Astra Desmond CBE
- 1950-51: Edric Cundell CBE
- 1951-52: Herbert Howells CH CBE
- 1952-53: Walter Stanton
- 1953-54: Herbert Wiseman
- 1954-55: W Greenhouse Allt CVO CBE
- 1955-56: Sir Reginald Thatcher OBE MC
- 1956-57: Sir Malcolm Sargent
- 1957-58: Douglas Fox OBE
- 1959-60: Leslie Regan
- 1960-61: Sir Thomas Armstrong
- 1961-62: Gerald Moore CBE
- 1962-63: Sir Jack Westrup
- 1963-64: James Denny MBE
- 1964-65: The Lord Menuhin OM KBE
- 1965-66: Frank Merrick CBE
- 1966-67: Maurice Allen
- 1967-68: Sir Anthony Lewis CBE
- 1968-69: Hervey Alan OBE
- 1969-70: Sir Peter Pears CBE
- 1970-71: Philip Cranmer
- 1971-72: Sir Charles Groves CBE
- 1972-74: Leonard Blake
- 1974-75: Willis Grant
- 1975-76: Richard Lewis CBE
- 1976-77: Ida Carroll OBE
- 1977-78: William Llewellyn MBE
- 1978-79: Sir David Willcocks CBE MC
- 1979-80: Ian Wallace OBE
- 1980-81: Evelyn Barbirolli OBE
- 1981-82: Ronald Smith
- 1982-83: Sir Charles Groves CBE
- 1983-84: John McCabe CBE
- 1984-85: Sir David Lumsden
- 1985-86: Meredith Davies CBE
- 1986-87: Louis Carus
- 1987-88: Patrick Salisbury
- 1988-89: Pamela Bowden
- 1989-90: William Mathias CBE
- 1990-91: Dr Lionel Dakers CBE
- 1991-92: Sir John Manduell CBE
- 1992-93: Dame Gillian Weir DBE
- 1993-94: Jack Brymer OBE
- 1994-95: Sir Philip Ledger CBE
- 1995-96: Emanuel Hurwitz CBE
- 1996-97: Ian Partridge CBE
- 1997-98: Professor George Pratt
- 1998-99: John Hosier CBE
- 1999-2000: Dr George McPhee MBE
- 2000-01: Sarah Walker CBE
- 2001-02: John Stephens OBE
- 2002-03: Guy Woolfenden OBE
- 2003-04: Professor John Morehen
- 2004-05: Professor George Caird
- 2005-06: Robert Lloyd CBE
- 2006-07: Colin Bradbury
- 2007-08: Roger Vignoles
- 2008-09: Professor Roderick Swanston
- 2009-10: Kenneth Ian Hÿtch
- 2010-11: Professor Gavin Henderson CBE
- 2011-12: Professor Paul Max Edlin
- 2012-13: Suzi Digby OBE (Lady Eatwell)
- 2013-14: Richard Hallam MBE
- 2014-15: Professor Sir Barry Ife CBE
- 2015-16: Jeremy Jackman
- 2016-17: Nicolas Chisholm MBE
- 2017-18: Susan Sturrock
- 2018-19: Professor David Saint
- 2019-20: Dr Jeremy Huw Williams BEM
- 2020-21: Professor Chris Collins
- 2021-22: Deborah Keyser
- 2022-23: Vick Bain
- 2023-24: Pauline Black
- 2024-present: Nicky Spence

== Services ==
The ISM supports members through expert legal assistance from a specialist in-house legal team and a 24-hour legal and tax helpline, comprehensive insurance including public liability insurance, legal expenses insurance, and discounted musical instrument insurance; practical advice ISM's staff team and access to online advice pages; free promotion through the ISM Music Directory, the UK's only online directory of professional musicians; professional development events including seminars, webinars and conferences.

== Campaigns and surveys ==
In its work to protect musicians' rights and support the profession across the sector, the ISM campaigns and lobbies to make their views known to policy makers.

The ISM led a successful campaign to secure the place of music in the English Baccalaureate as part of a sixth pillar of creative and cultural subjects. The campaign achieved nearly 50,000 signatures to a petition and support from over 110 organisations. On 7 February 2013 the Government withdrew its EBC proposals and introduced a new performance measure for schools that will include creative subjects.

In 2015, the campaign was relaunched in response to the Department for Education's proposal to implement the English Baccalaureate as a headline accountability measure in schools. The campaign is supported by 100,000+ individual signatories and over 200 organisations from across the creative industries including Aardman Animations, Shakespeare's Globe, The BRIT School, The Design Council and more. The campaign has recently debated the issue of the EBacc and its exclusion of creative subjects in the Houses of Parliament.

In 2014, the Government launched a consultation on the new GCSE, AS and A level in music. While the aims of the reforms were positive, the Government defined only one area of study: 'music composed in the western classical tradition between 1700 and 1900.' The ISM stated, 'not only does this artificial time-frame make no musical sense but musicians of the future will only be able to study classical music written before 1700 and after 1900 if they take this as a separate area of study, and the overall effect of the reforms will do little to support and encourage musicality. And it could even have a detrimental effect on musicianship and the study of musical genres.' The ISM subsequently the 'Beyond 1990' campaign, urging the music sector to respond to the consultation.

In 2013 the ISM launched the campaign Protect Music Education calling for confirmed funding for music education hubs from 2015, and for the Government to drop its proposal advising local authorities to cease funding music education. It united the music sector, gaining the support of 134 organisations from across the music sector, 5,000 individuals and many distinguished musicians.

On 22 July 2014, the campaign was deemed a double success, with £75million of funding for music education in 2015/16 secured, and the Government backing down on its proposal. The ISM has an ongoing campaign to help musicians travel by air with confidence, taking fragile, hand-held instruments in the cabin as part of hand baggage allowance. easyJet announced a more musician-friendly hand baggage policy following discussions with the ISM. A survey by the ISM in 2017 found that 60% of the respondents had experienced sexual harassment.

== Affiliations ==
The ISM holds memberships with many industry bodies, including the Council for Subject Associations, Creative Coalition Campaign, Creators' Rights Alliance, Educational Recording Agency, National Campaign for the Arts and the National Music Council.

== Awards ==
In 1976, under President Ida Carroll, the ISM established the Distinguished Musician Award to acknowledge outstanding contributions to British musical life.

Recipients have included: Dr Kadiatu Kanneh-Mason, Errollyn Wallen CBE, Thomas Adès, John Wilson, Kathryn McDowell CBE, Dame Emma Kirkby, Dame Felicity Lott, Malcolm Arnold, Janet Baker, Nicola Benedetti, Sarah Connolly, Pierre Boulez, Adrian Boult, Julian Bream, Janet Craxton, Peter Maxwell Davies, Colin Davis, Norman Del Mar, Jacqueline du Pré, Mark Elder, James Galway, Alexander Gibson, Evelyn Glennie, Reginald Goodall, Charles Groves, Christopher Hogwood, Witold Lutosławski, Charles Mackerras, George Malcolm, John McCabe, Antonio Pappano, Peter Pears, Simon Rattle, John Stephens, Michael Tippett, William Walton, Fanny Waterman, Judith Weir, David Willcocks, Julian Lloyd-Webber and Oliver Knussen
