= Martin Isepp =

Austrian-British pianist and conductor (1930–2011)

- Isepp at Glyndebourne

Background information
- Born: Martin Johannes Sebastian Isepp; 30 September 1930; Vienna, Austria
- Died: 25 December 2011 (aged 81) London, U.K.
- Occupation: Musician
- Education: Lincoln College, Oxford and Royal College of Music
- Spouse: Rose Harris
- Parent(s): Sebastian Isepp and Hélène Isepp, née Hammerschlag
- Relatives: 3 sons

Martin Johannes Sebastian Isepp (30 September 1930 – 25 December 2011) was an Austrian‐born British pianist, harpsichordist, conductor and teacher. He had an international career, and worked with leading singers for several decades. Among those with whom he performed were Janet Baker, Hugues Cuénod, Hans Hotter and Elisabeth Schwarzkopf. For more than forty years he was associated with Glyndebourne Festival Opera, and he held posts in opera houses and music academies in Britain, continental Europe and North America.

== Life and career ==
Isepp was born in Vienna, the son of Sebastian Isepp, who was an artist and art restorer, and his wife, a singer and teacher Hélène Isepp, née Hammerschlag, whose pupils after she moved to Britain included Janet Baker, Bernadette Greevy, Heather Harper and Jeannette Sinclair. In 1938 the Isepps fled from Vienna to Britain, where Sebastian secured posts at the National Gallery in London and the Ashmolean Museum in Oxford.

After studying at Lincoln College, Oxford and the Royal College of Music, Isepp joined Benjamin Britten's English Opera Group in 1954. In 1957 he joined the music staff of Glyndebourne Festival Opera, where he served for 34 years, in capacities including chief music coach 1973–78 and head of the music staff 1978–93. From 1994 until 2007 he returned annually as a chief guest coach. Apart from his work at Glyndebourne, Isepp was head of opera training at the Juilliard School in New York from 1973 to 1977. He was appointed head of music studies at the National Opera Studio in London in 1978, and was head of the academy of singing at the Banff Centre in Alberta, Canada, from 1981 to 1993.

Isepp frequently conducted performances by Glyndebourne's touring company, and was an associate conductor of the Metropolitan Opera, New York. Between 2006 and 2008 he was head of music at the Opera Akademie of the Royal Danish Opera in Copenhagen. As an accompanist, Isepp performed with singers including Janet Baker, Hugues Cuénod, Hans Hotter, Elisabeth Schwarzkopf, John Shirley-Quirk, Elisabeth Söderström and Frederica von Stade. As a harpsichordist or pianist he took part in recordings of operas by Britten and Handel.

Isepp died in London at the age of 81. He was survived by his widow, Rose (née Harris), whom he married in 1966. They had three sons, one of whom predeceased him. Janet Baker described Isepp as "one of the most deeply sensitive musicians I have ever met ... I do not know of anyone in our profession who is regarded with more affection". The obituarist in The Independent wrote:

His long-standing collaboration with Dame Janet Baker remains a model of what can be achieved when two great artists join forces. Their landmark recording, An Anthology of English Song, a pleasing juxtaposition of elegant vocal miniatures first released in 1962, attracted widespread critical acclaim. Fifty years on, it now forms a poignant and fitting monument, not only to an outstanding musician, but perhaps more importantly, to a most delightful human being.

== Videography ==
- Glyndebourne Festival Opera: a Gala Evening (1992), Arthaus Musik DVD, 100-432, 2004
