= Idloes Owen =

Founder of the Welsh National Opera

Evan Idloes Owen (10 September 1894 – July–September 1954) was a Welsh singer, composer, and conductor. He was the principal founder of the Welsh National Opera.

== Early life ==
Idloes Owen, was born in late 1894 in the mining village of Merthyr Vale in Glamorgan. His parents Richard and Jane originally came from Llanidloes a market town in Montgomeryshire mid-Wales. They moved to Merthyr Vale, to seek work in the valley mines further south. There were six children in the Owen family, two elder brothers John and Thomas, sisters Hannah and Mary, Idloes himself and a younger brother called Christmas. He and his brothers followed their father into the coal mines at the age of 12.

Idloes was later diagnosed with tuberculosis and after leaving the mines, was able to pursue his passion for music. There was a strong community spirit in the mining village, and his neighbours in Merthyr Vale recognised his musical ability, and raised money to send him to Music College to develop his talent.

He later moved to Cardiff and became a composer, arranger and conductor, and performed with the pre-war Lyrian Singers in Cardiff. He was considered at this time to be one of the finest singing teachers in Wales; Geraint Evans was one of his pupils. Amongst his musical arrangements were "Down Among The Dead Men", based on an old English melody for a male chorus, "The Lord's Prayer", and a Welsh piece "I Toriad Y Wawr" (The Break Of Dawn). During the early part of the war in the 1940s he was instrumental in providing Mai Jones, who was working for the BBC in Cardiff with a musical score, composed initially by a friend and fellow Lyrian singer Thomas Morgan. It was (the now famous Welsh Standard) "We'll Keep a Welcome". Later conducting the Lyrian singers in 1951 he achieved the Melody Maker song charts with the same song, narrated by Tom Jones.

== Founding the Welsh National Opera ==
His greatest success and legacy came with the founding of the Welsh National Opera Company. He became its first Conductor, General Manager and Musical Director. In November 1943, at a gathering of a small group of music lovers, at his home in Llandaff, he was instrumental in forming The Lyrian Grand Opera Company. A month later at its first general meeting the name was changed to The Welsh National Opera Company. It was formed from members of the old Cardiff Grand Opera Company, the BBC Welsh Singers and the Lyrian Singers. The company gave early performances in 1945 with concerts and operatic excerpts at various venues in Cardiff.

One of his former students Mollie Hair remembers him as a quiet, patient and understated man, who never lost his temper and was completely dedicated to music. Whilst the miners, policemen and shopkeepers who made up the chorus, had wonderful voices, he persuaded Mollie to work as a coach to bring visual grace to their operatic performances.

The first full season of opera came after the war in April 1946 at the Prince of Wales Theatre, Cardiff. Owen as Musical Director conducted the first performance, Cavalleria rusticana, which included the Welsh tenor Robert Tear who started his career as a schoolboy in this performance.

In 1948 the Welsh National Opera became a limited company and established another centre in Swansea. In 1951 the company made its first tour of Wales. In January 1950 Idloes Owen invited an astute businessman Bill Smith a former secretary of the defunct Cardiff Grand Opera to be his partner to develop the potential of the new company. Smith immediately responded by booking the young Charles Mackerras as conductor to take charge of The Tales of Hoffmann that season. They shared a passion to make the WNO stand comparison with any other opera company in the world and in 1952 they staged Verdi's Nabucco. With its Biblical story, the opera needed a superb chorus, Verdi's third opera was ideal for WNO, and it was the Company's first in-house production.

In April 1953 they toured with it for their first performances outside Wales opened at the Bournemouth Pavilion. The New Theatre, Cardiff was to become the company's Cardiff base in November 1954, but without a permanent home WNO still had to tour to survive. A production of Pagliacci had been chosen, but Idloes Owen died in the summer of that year in Cardiff, at the age of 59, and it was never staged.

The following year his company under the music director Vilém Tauský gave its first performances in London at Sadler's Wells theatre in Islington. They performed two Verdi operas Nabucco and I Lombardi alla prima crociata and Wagner's Lohengrin, to many curtain calls and rave reviews.

== Sources ==
- National Library of Wales, Welsh National Opera Company Records, Reference code(s): GB 0210 WELANY
- A Welsh Uncle, memories of Tom Morgan 1898-1957, John Dann, FastPrint Peterborough, 2018 ISBN 978-178456-597-8
- Welsh National Opera, Richard Fawkes, Foreword by HRH Princess of Wales, Julia MacRae Books London 1986, ISBN 0-86203-184-2
