= Felicity Lott =

English soprano (1947–2026)

Dame Felicity Lott DBE FRAM FRCM
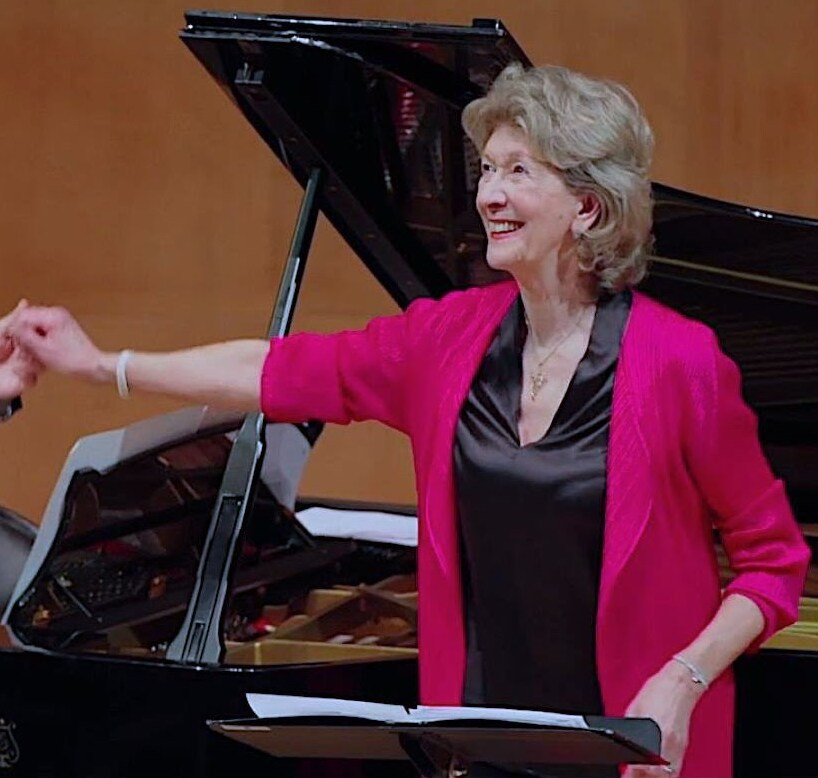
- Lott in 2018
- Born: Felicity Ann Emwhyla Lott; 8 May 1947; Cheltenham, Gloucestershire, England
- Died: 15 May 2026 (aged 79); East Sussex, England
- Education: Royal Holloway, University of London; Royal Academy of Music
- Occupation: Soprano
- Organizations: Glyndebourne; Wigmore Hall
- Title: Kammersängerin
- Spouse: Robin Golding (m. 1973; div. 1982) Gabriel Woolf (m. 1984)
- Children: 1
- Website: www.felicitylott.de

Dame Felicity Ann Emwhyla Lott (8 May 1947 – 15 May 2026) was an English soprano, among the leading voices in operas by Mozart and Richard Strauss and operettas by Jacques Offenbach. Her first signature role was the Countess in Capriccio, the last opera by Strauss, on the Glyndebourne Festival's tour in 1976. She appeared with the company in every season until 1990, also in 20th-century operas: as Helena in Britten's A Midsummer Night's Dream, Anne in Stravinsky's The Rake's Progress and Elle in Poulenc's La Voix humaine. She portrayed the Countess in Mozart's Le nozze di Figaro, including for her first performance on stage in the United States at the Lyric Opera of Chicago in 1987, and the title role of Offenbach's La belle Hélène at the Théâtre du Châtelet in Paris. She portrayed the Marschallin in Der Rosenkavalier by Strauss at the Metropolitan Opera in 1990 and in an iconic 1994 performance at the Vienna State Opera that was recorded.

Lott had a special love for French mélodies, German lieder, and the English art song repertoire. She supported music organisations as a member, vice-president and patron. An obituary in The Guardian described her "mellifluous tone with just a hint of metal to give it that lustrous gleam, the effortlessly floated high notes, pin-sharp diction and captivating stage presence". She received several honorary doctorates and lifetime achievement awards.

== Life and career ==
Lott was born in Cheltenham in Gloucestershire on 8 May 1947. Her parents were John Lott, who ran an accountancy business, and Whyla (née Williams). Her father played the piano in pubs, and both parents sang with the Cheltenham Choral Society. From an early age, she was musical, taking piano lessons from age five. She also played violin and began singing lessons at 12. Fluent in French, she wanted to become an interpreter, and later used her affinity to languages in her singing.

At age 20, she lived in Voiron, France, for a year, teaching secondary school children. During this time she took singing lessons at the Conservatoire de Grenoble. Her teacher advised her to study singing professionally, and sent her to an international music academy in 1968. She was an alumna of Royal Holloway, University of London, where she obtained a Bachelor of Arts in French and Latin in 1969. She then studied singing at the Royal Academy of Music. Her main interest was the interpretation of mélodies and lieder. During her studies, she appeared as Handel's Seleuce in Tolomeo and in the title role of Arianna in Creta in 1973 at the Unicorn Opera in Abingdon, and as Mozart's Elvira in Don Giovanni and Fiordiligi in Così fan tutte at the Leicester University Opera.

=== Early opera career ===
Lott made her professional operatic debut at the City of London Festival in 1974 as Seleuce in Tolomeo. The following year she stepped in as Pamina in Mozart's The Magic Flute at the English National Opera, repeating the role both at the company's London theatre and on tours. This was followed by performances as Natascha in Prokofiev's War and Peace and Roxane in Szymanowski's King Roger. In 1976 she took part, in a small role, in the London premiere of Hans Werner Henze's We Come to the River at the Royal Opera House, and then as Helena in Britten's A Midsummer Night's Dream. She appeared as Jenifer in Tippett's The Midsummer Marriage at the Welsh National Opera.

=== Glyndebourne ===
Lott performed at the Glyndebourne from 1976 to 1990, returning in 1998 and 2002, with roles including Anne in Stravinsky's The Rake's Progress, Elle in Poulenc's La Voix humaine, Pamina, Helena, Mozart's Fiordiligi, the Countess in Le nozze di Figaro, and Elvira in Don Giovanni and Lady Billows in Britten's Albert Herring. She performed the title role in Lehár's The Merry Widow at Glyndebourne, as well as Rosalinde in Die Fledermaus by J. Strauss and the title role in Offenbach's La Grande-Duchesse de Gérolstein.

=== Roles ===
Lott also portrayed the Countess in Le nozze di Figaro for her first performance on stage in the United States at the Lyric Opera of Chicago in 1987. When she appeared in the title role of Offenbach's La belle Hélène at the Théâtre du Châtelet in Paris, staged by Laurent Pelly, the audience shed tears of laughter. Her roles also included the title role in Charpentier's Louise, Britten's Ellen Orford in Peter Grimes, The Governess in The Turn of the Screw, and Poulenc's Blanche in Dialogues of the Carmelites.

=== Strauss ===
Lott became associated with the works of Richard Strauss including his lieder, such as Four Last Songs. She had early international success as the Countess in Capriccio, performed first at the Glyndebourne Festival, in 1976 on tour with Charles Mackerras conducting. She also portrayed the role in a concert performance at Carnegie Hall in 1986. Her next Strauss role at Glyndebourne was the title role of Der Rosenkavalier in 1980, followed by Christine in Intermezzo, given in English. She made her debut with the Bavarian State Opera in this role, spending six rehearsal weeks on the conversational piece in German, performed at the Cuvilliés Theatre. She appeared as the Marschallin in Der Rosenkavalier at the Metropolitan Opera in New York City in 1990 and at the Bavarian State Opera from 1991 to 2006, earning her the title of Kammersängerin. Her 1994 portrayal of the role at the Vienna State Opera, conducted by Carlos Kleiber, became legendary. She performed alongside Anne Sofie von Otter in the title role, Barbara Bonney as Sophie and Kurt Moll as Ochs, and it was recorded on DVD by Austrian television, and taken on a tour of Japan. She was regarded as an ideal Marschallin for her "elegance and noblesse, her musical intelligence and her warm-hearted human charisma". She appeared at the Vienna State Opera also as the Countess in Capriccio and in the title role of Arabella.

=== Recitals ===
Lott had a special love for French mélodies, German lieder and the English art song repertoire, particularly the songs by Benjamin Britten. She recorded the complete orchestral lieder by Strauss conducted by Neeme Järvi. Her accompanist from her student days was Graham Johnson, and they gave a large number of recitals and recordings together, including anthologies of songs by different composers based on poetry by Goethe and Baudelaire. In an interview for a book in 2018 Lott remarked that after meeting Johnson as an accompanist for her lessons "we became, and remain, great friends and colleagues and he is probably the single most important musical event in my life!".

She gave recitals singing duets with Ann Murray and Thomas Allen. She appeared at the Schwarzenberg Schubertiade in songs by Schubert, interpreted with an intellectual grasp, charm, humour and sensuality. She often appeared at Wigmore Hall in London, and supported the hall, for example in the Wigmore French Song Exchange.

=== Organisations ===
Lott was a founding member, with Johnson, Murray, Anthony Rolfe Johnson and Richard Jackson, of the Songmakers' Almanac in 1976, in order to perform less well-known art songs. Lott was a vice-president of the British Youth Opera and The Bach Choir. She was a member of the Incorporated Society of Musicians, and a patron of the Southwell Music Festival, of the British Voice Association and of Bampton Classical Opera.

=== Personal life ===
Lott married Robin Golding, a music writer, editor and registrar at the Royal Academy of Music, in 1973. The couple were divorced in 1982, and he died in 2009. She married the actor Gabriel Woolf in 1984; the couple had a daughter.

On her 79th birthday, Lott gave an interview to The Observer in which she announced that she had cancer in a final stage. She auctioned her former haute couture dresses in support of hospices.

Living near Brighton, East Sussex, Lott died of lung cancer in a local hospice on 15 May 2026, a week after her 79th birthday. Her death came shortly after the BBC Radio 4 programme about her, in the series This Cultural Life, was first broadcast.

== Honours and awards ==
Lott sang Mozart's Laudate Dominum at the wedding of Prince Andrew and Sarah Ferguson in 1986 at Westminster Abbey.

She was honoured by Elizabeth II with the title Dame in 1996. She received many honorary doctorates, including from the universities of Oxford, London, Leicester, Gloucestershire, Sussex, Loughborough, and from the Royal Scottish Academy of Music and Drama in Glasgow. Lott was a recipient of the Légion d'Honneur in 2001. In 2003 she was awarded the title of Bayerische Kammersängerin.

The National Portrait Gallery holds a 2004 photograph of Lott by British photographer Derry Moore. In 2009 she was appointed a visiting professor by Royal Holloway. On 9 February 2010, she was presented with the Wigmore Hall Medal by Prince Edward, Duke of Kent, at the launch of the hall's 110th-anniversary programme. The medal was introduced in 2006 and is awarded to internationally important artistic figures in recognition of their significant contribution to the hall. The review praised her "unique contribution to Wigmore Hall and to the advancement of the song recital as a concert-going experience throughout the world". It was 35 years since she first performed there, in 1975. In 2016, she received the International Classical Music Awards lifetime achievement award. In 2023 she was awarded Gramophone's lifetime achievement award.

== Discography ==
In 1977, Lott recorded Charpentier's Te Deum, H. 146, with the Choir of King's College, Cambridge and the Academy of St. Martin-in-the-Fields, conducted by Philip Ledger, for EMI Records. She was also featured as a soloist in a recording of Mozart's Requiem with the London Philharmonic Choir and Orchestra. She sang in Haydn's Nelson Mass, conducted by Trevor Pinnock; the recording won a Grammy Award in 1986.

For Hyperion Records, Lott recorded many songs, by Chabrier, Fauré, Gounod, Reynaldo Hahn, Poulenc, and Schubert, often with Graham Johnson, and for Chandos Records, songs by Richard Strauss and Wolf, among others. She recorded an anthology of English songs by 19 composers including Britten, Frank Bridge, Thomas Dunhill, Armstrong Gibbs, Percy Grainger, Herbert Howells, and Maude Valérie White.

== Videography ==
Videos of complete operas include Britten's A Midsummer Night's Dream (Helena), Offenbach's La Grande-Duchesse de Gérolstein (title role) and La belle Hélène (title role), Mozart's Die Zauberflöte (Pamina), and Stravinsky's The Rake's Progress (Anne Trulove). She participated in Glyndebourne Festival Opera: A Gala Evening in 1992, recorded as DVD by Arthaus Musik.
