= Anne Evans (soprano) =

Dame Anne Evans DBE
- Born: Anne Elizabeth Jane Evans; 20 August 1941 (age 85); London, England
- Occupation: Operatic soprano
- Years active: 1967–2003

Dame Anne Elizabeth Jane Evans, DBE (born 20 August 1941) is a British operatic soprano who made an international career.

== Early life ==
Evans was born in London of Welsh descent. She studied at the Royal College of Music with among others Margaret Cable, and the Geneva Conservatoire. She was accepted into the conservatoire without actually having had any formal training as a singer. For her audition she surprisingly did Carmen. She started out as a mezzo-soprano at the Royal College, but one of her teachers immediately recognised her soprano potential.

== Career ==
Evans made her debut as Countess Ceprano in Verdi's Rigoletto 1967 in Geneva and went on to first perform a leading role in 1968 as Fiordiligi in Mozart's Così fan tutte at the then Sadler's Wells, later English National Opera in 1968 to critical acclaim.

In the early years of her career, she sang many of the leading Puccini and Mozart soprano roles, like Tosca and Countess Almaviva in Le Nozze di Figaro. In the late sixties she started to work with the lighter Wagner roles, like Elsa in Lohengrin and Senta in The Flying Dutchman, roles that became her trade mark. However, it was the role of Brünnhilde that would earn her international fame, most notably at the Bayreuth Festival in 1989–1992, a performance which was also captured on CD and video, conducted by Daniel Barenboim and directed by Harry Kupfer. In this performance she sang with, amongst others, Siegfried Jerusalem and John Tomlinson. She also earned an Olivier Award for this production. She also portrayed Isolde in Tristan und Isolde, a role often considered to be her finest achievement.

== Retirement ==
In 2003, she retired from performing to dedicate herself to giving masterclasses and to coach other British singers in Wagnerian performance techniques. Her last public performance was in 2005 in a comeback performance in Cardiff doing excerpts from her celebrated Isolde and other Wagner performances.

== Honours ==
Evans was appointed Dame Commander of the Order of the British Empire (DBE) in the 2000 Queen's Birthday Honours "for services to music".
