= Mahler Symphony No. 4 (Yoel Levi recording) =

Symphony No. 4 & Songs of a Wayfarer
- Telarc CD CD-80499

Studio album by Yoel Levi
- Released: 1999
- Studio: Symphony Hall, Woodruff Arts Center, Atlanta
- Genre: Classical
- Length: 73:44
- Language: German
- Label: Telarc
- Producer: Elaine Martone

Mahler Symphony No. 4 is a 73-minute studio album on which Mahler's Fourth and his song cycle Lieder eines fahrenden Gesellen are performed by Frederica von Stade and the Atlanta Symphony Orchestra under the direction of Yoel Levi. The recording was released in 1999.

== Background ==
The album was recorded shortly after von Stade and the Atlanta Symphony Orchestra had performed its programme with Levi in concert.

== Recording ==
The album was recorded digitally on 11–12 July 1998 in Symphony Hall at the Woodruff Arts Center, Atlanta, Georgia.

== Packaging ==
The cover of the album was designed by Jim Burt of Burt & Burt Studio under the art direction of Anilda Carrasquillo. It features photography by Tom and Pat Leeson.

== Critical reception ==
There are many recordings of Mahler's 4th.

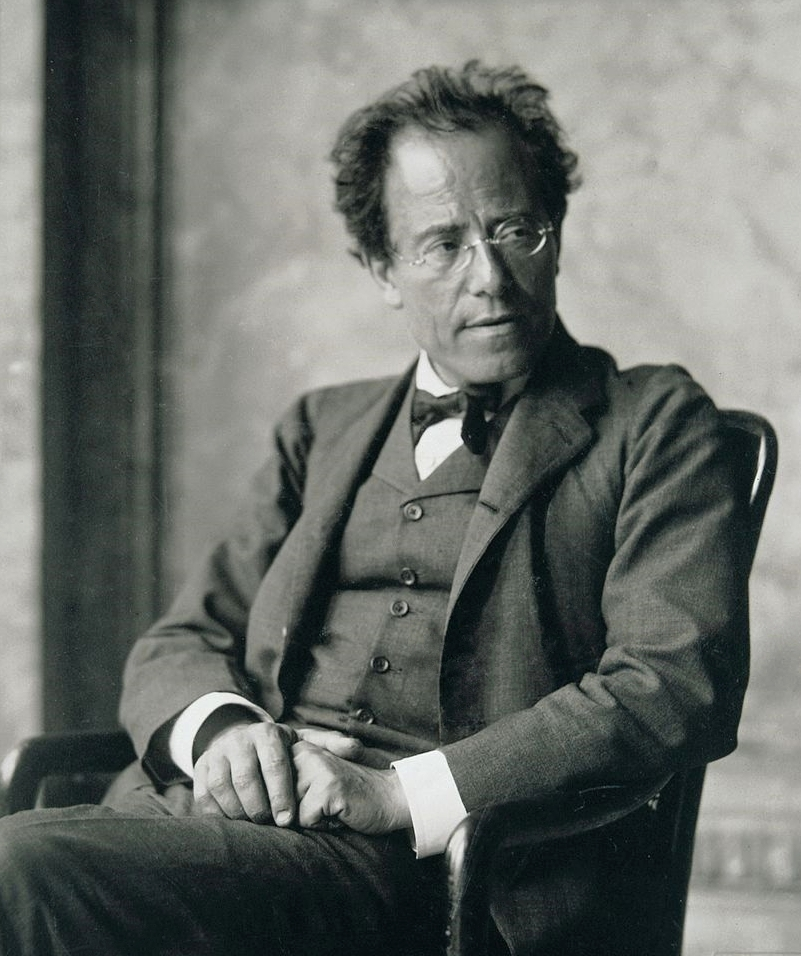
Gustav Mahler photographed by Moritz Nähr in 1907

David S. Gutman reviewed the album in Gramophone in July 1999, comparing it with recordings of the symphony conducted by Lorin Maazel, Colin Davis and Claudio Abbado - the latter also featuring von Stade as soloist - and with a recording of Lieder eines fahrenden Gesellen that von Stade had made with Andrew Davis. Von Stade's contribution to the symphony's fourth movement - separated from the third by a puzzling, extended pause - was, he thought, "slightly disappointing". The passing years had robbed her of a little of the "boyish freshness" that she had brought to the movement's Wunderhorn song when taping the symphony with Abbado in 1977. Abbado's album also bettered Levi's in its orchestral playing, as did Gutman's other reference recordings of the symphony. Levi's Atlanta Symphony Orchestra was "fine", but it lacked the sumptuous string tone that the Vienna Philharmonic had produced for Abbado and Maazel or the Bavarian Radio Symphony Orchestra for Colin Davis. Conducting, Levi displayed both strengths and weaknesses. As he had already shown on his recordings of Mahler's Symphony No. 5 and Symphony No. 6, his approach to the composer was "fresh-toned and understated", and he was well suited temperamentally to a work with a "relatively sunny disposition and low neurosis quotient". His interpretation rejoiced in "incidental beauties" and "a mass of detail and colour". But he had allowed himself many (admittedly small) deviations from Mahler's stipulated tempos and accent markings, and his reading as a whole was "just a shade undercooked".

In the Lieder eines fahrenden Gesellen, as in the symphony, it was evident that von Stade was no longer quite the singer that she had been in the 1970s. The "bubbly Arcadia" of "Ging heut Morgen über's Feld" no longer had the same conviction as the "heart-rending" final bars of "Ich hab' ein glühend Messer". Von Stade's admirers would find much in her new album to please them, but there was no escaping the fact that it was not the best in her discography. On the other hand, there was not a note in her performance that sounded exaggerated, and "even when the pitch is ever so slightly suspect or the tone no longer quite so lustrous, she remains wistful, touching and ardent". Von Stade enthusiasts who bought Levi's disc could be assured, too, that they would get to hear their idol in "exceptional" recorded sound.

The album was also reviewed in Classic CD.

== CD track listing ==
Gustav Mahler (1860-1911)

Symphony No. 4 (1901), text from Des Knaben Wunderhorn (traditional)

- 1 (16:58) Bedächtig, Nicht eilen
- 2 (9:32) In gemächlicher Bewegung, Ohne Hast
- 3 (20:33) Ruhevoll
- 4 (9:19) Sehr behaglich

Lieder eines fahrenden Gesellen (1896), text by Gustav Mahler

- 5 (3:53) "Wenn mein Schatz Hochzeit macht"
- 6 (4:25) "Ging heut' Morgen über's Feld"
- 7 (3:26) "Ich hab' ein glühend Messer"
- 8 (4:50) "Die zwei blauen Augen von meinem Schatz"

== Personnel ==
=== Musical ===
- Frederica von Stade, mezzo-soprano
- Atlanta Symphony Orchestra
- Yoel Levi, conductor

=== Other ===
- Robert Woods, executive producer
- Elaine Martone, recording producer
- Michael Bishop, recording engineer
- Thomas C. Moore, editor and recording assistant
- James Yates, technical assistant

== Release history ==
Telarc released the album on CD (catalogue number CD-80499) in 1999 with a 16-page insert booklet including texts in German and English, detailed notes by Nick Jones, a biography and photograph of von Stade and a list of the members of the Atlanta Symphony Orchestra who took part in the recording.

== See also ==
- Mahler: Symphony No. 4, with Frederica von Stade (Claudio Abbado recording)
- Mahler: Lieder eines fahrenden Gesellen, Rückert-lieder and two songs from Des Knaben Wunderhorn, with Frederica von Stade (Andrew Davis recording)
