= Andrew Davis (conductor) =

English conductor (1944–2024)

Sir Andrew Davis CBE
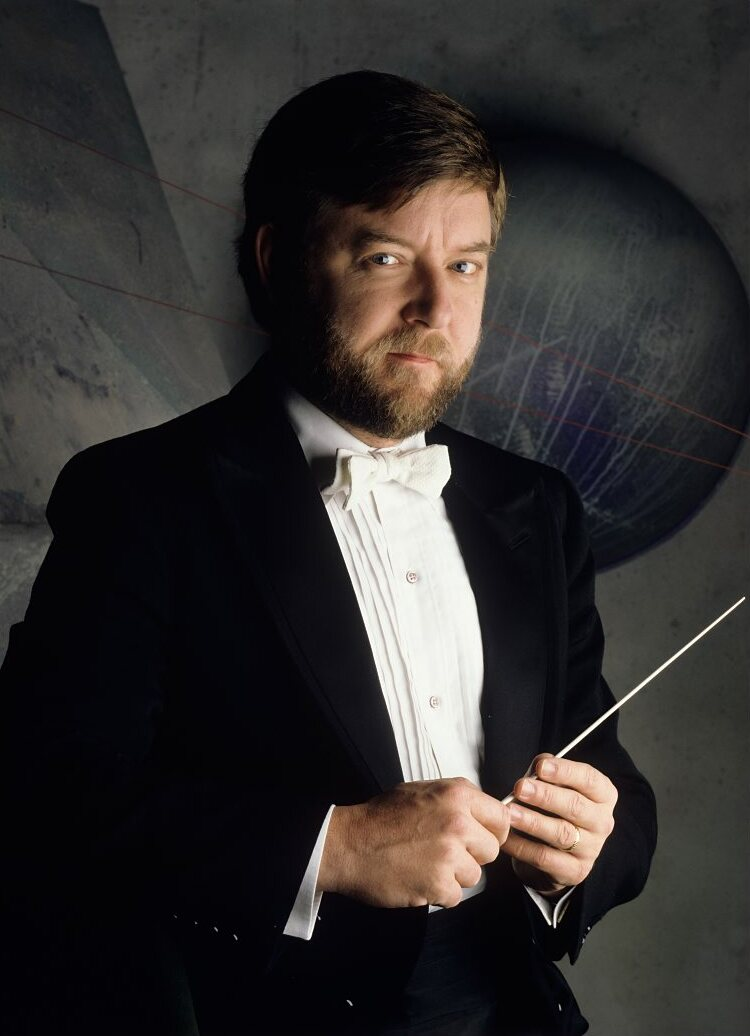
- Davis, c. 1987
- Born: Andrew Frank Davis; 2 February 1944; Ashridge, Hertfordshire, England
- Died: 20 April 2024 (aged 80); Chicago, Illinois, U.S.
- Occupation: Conductor
- Spouse: Gianna Rolandi (m. 1989; died 2021)
- Children: 1
- Website: sirandrewdavis.com

Sir Andrew Frank Davis CBE (2 February 1944 – 20 April 2024) was an English conductor. He was the long-time chief conductor of the Toronto Symphony Orchestra, the BBC Symphony Orchestra and the Melbourne Symphony Orchestra. He was music director at the Glyndebourne Festival from 1988 to 2000, and especially known for conducting the traditional Last Night of The Proms, including Last Night speeches. He was music director and principal conductor of the Lyric Opera of Chicago from 2000 to the 2020/21 season.

Music critic Alan Blyth described Davis as "a conductor whose technical skill was enhanced by an inborn enthusiasm for and dedication to the task in hand that he was able to transfer to the forces before him."

== Early life and education ==
Andrew Frank Davis was born on 2 February 1944, in Ashridge, Hertfordshire, England. His parents were Robert J. Davis and his wife Florence Joyce (née Badminton). Davis grew up in Chesham, Buckinghamshire, and in Watford. He had piano lessons from age five and attended Watford Boys' Grammar School, where he studied Classics in his sixth form years. His adolescent musical work included playing the organ at the Palace Theatre, Watford.

Davis studied at the Royal College of Music and King's College, Cambridge, where he was an organ scholar, graduating in 1967. He later studied conducting in Accademia Nazionale di Santa Cecilia, Rome, with Franco Ferrara.

== Career ==
Davis was a keyboardist (piano, harpsichord and organ) for the Academy of St Martin in the Fields from 1966 to 1970. He then made his debut with the BBC Scottish Symphony Orchestra and became associate conductor of the BBC Scottish Symphony Orchestra. In September 1974 he conducted the London Schools Symphony Orchestra at the Royal Festival Hall, London.

=== Toronto ===
From 1975 Davis was music director of the Toronto Symphony Orchestra (TSO). During his tenure the new Roy Thomson Hall was opened in 1982. He took the orchestra on tours of Asia, Europe and North America; in 1978 they toured China, in the UK they played in Edinburgh and at the Proms, in Canada they toured far north including Inuvik, North West Territories, and in the US they frequently performed at Carnegie Hall. He conducted the orchestra in 33 recordings; three of them received Juno Awards and two a Grammy nomination. He supported young talent, collaborating with the Toronto Symphony Youth Orchestra and supporting the founding of the Toronto Children's Chorus, performing in TSO concerts. He also played keyboard instruments and sometimes entertained as "master of ceremonies" in costume.

Davis held the post until 1988, and then took the title of Conductor Laureate with the TSO. He returned every year to conduct the orchestra, altogether 50 years from his debut in 1974. He conducted around 1000 concerts, at halls also including Massey Hall and Ontario Place. In 2018 a street near his home was named Sir Andrew Davis Lane. In 2019, he was surprised by the TSO in a birthday celebration: "The Orchestra and members of the Toronto Mendelssohn Choir surprise Interim Artistic Adviser and Conductor Laureate, Sir Andrew Davis, with a serenade on his 75th birthday. Recorded live at Roy Thomson Hall on February 2, 2019." In April 2022, he was one of the former TSO music directors, along with Gustavo Gimeno, meeting to celebrate the orchestra's 100th season, Maestros' Homecoming.

=== England ===
In 1988, Davis became music director at the Glyndebourne Festival, where he had first conducted Capriccio by Richard Strauss in 1973. In 1989, he married his third wife, the American soprano Gianna Rolandi (1952–2021), whom he had met while conducting at the Metropolitan Opera in 1984. He conducted operas there such as Janácek's The Makropulos Case, Rossini's Le comte Ory and Alban Berg's Lulu. Davis concluded his Glyndebourne tenure in 2000. In 1989, Sir John Drummond appointed Davis as chief conductor of the BBC Symphony Orchestra (BBC SO). During his BBC SO tenure, Davis restored the tradition established by Malcolm Sargent of the chief conductor of the BBC SO conducting the Last Night of The Proms. He was noted for his humorous Last Night speeches, including giving two speeches to the Major-General's patter song from The Pirates of Penzance, in 1998 and in 2000, but he also more seriously addressed the deaths of Diana, Princess of Wales, Mother Teresa, and Sir Georg Solti in his 1997 Last Night speech. Davis stepped down as chief conductor of BBC SO in 2000 and from then held the title of Conductor Laureate of the orchestra. In 1998 he conducted at the Proms Elgar's Third Symphony that Anthony Payne had derived from the composer's sketches.

In May 1992, Davis was appointed Commander of the Order of the British Empire (CBE) and in the 1999 New Year Honours he was appointed a Knight Bachelor. In 2002 he conducted the Prom at the Palace concert, held in the gardens of Buckingham Palace as part of the celebrations for the Queen's Golden Jubilee.

=== Chicago ===
Davis became music director and principal conductor of the Lyric Opera of Chicago in 2000. His work in Chicago included his first conducting of Wagner's Der Ring des Nibelungen cycle in 2005 and the first Chicago production of Michael Tippett's The Midsummer Marriage. His Lyric Opera of Chicago tenure ended at the close of the 2020–2021 season.

In 2005 Davis became Music Advisor to the Pittsburgh Symphony Orchestra, for a designated three-year period. In September 2006, he announced that he would relinquish this position with Pittsburgh after the 2007–2008 season. In October 2007, Davis and the orchestra mutually agreed to terminate his contract early and for him not to conduct his scheduled Pittsburgh Symphony concerts in the 2007–2008 season, because of increased demands on his schedule.

=== Melbourne ===
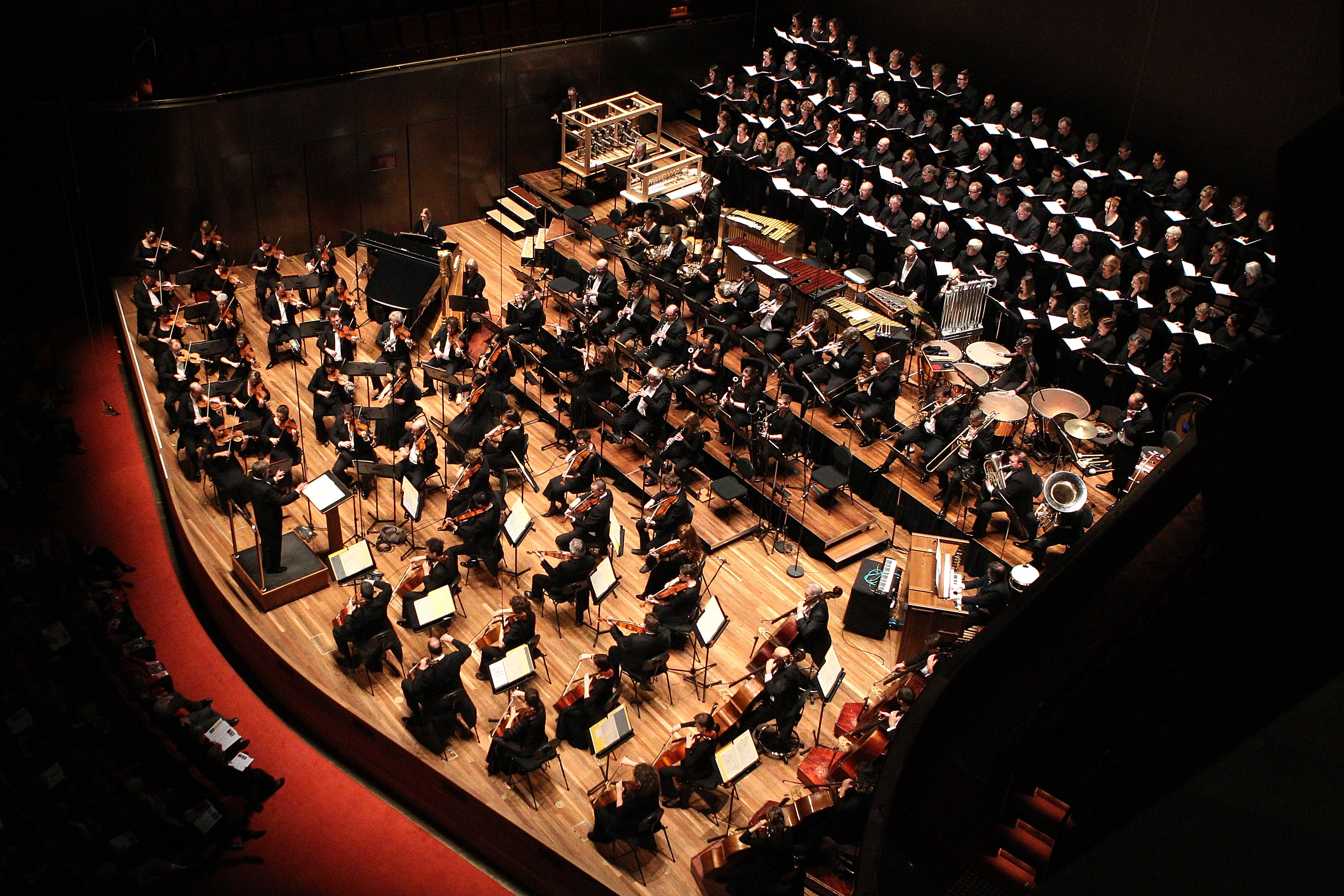
Davis conducting the Melbourne Symphony Orchestra and Chorus in August 2012

In June 2012 the Melbourne Symphony Orchestra (MSO) named Davis its chief conductor, effective in January 2013, with an initial contract of four years. In July 2015, the MSO extended Davis's contract through 2019. He conducted chorus and orchestra in August 2012 in works by Percy Grainger, including Tribute to Foster, and subsequently recorded them. He recorded with the orchestra orchestral works by the Australian composer Carl Vine, which was nominated for an ARIA Music Awards in the category Best Classical Album. Davis concluded his MSO chief conductorship in December 2019, and was named Conductor Laureate the following year.

=== Personal life ===
Davis and his wife Gianna Rolandi resided in Chicago. They married in 1989 and their marriage lasted until her death in 2021. Their son Ed Frazier Davis is a composer and conductor.

Davis died from leukaemia in Chicago, on 20 April 2024, at the age of 80.

== Repertoire ==
Davis performed a wide range of repertoire, with a particular focus on British composers, such as Harrison Birtwistle, Benjamin Britten, Edward Elgar and Michael Tippett, He conducted the British premiere of Tippett's The Mask of Time. Davis programmed 20th-century music by composers including Pierre Boulez, Leoš Janáček and Olivier Messiaen, and participated in world premieres, both as player and conductor.

=== Recordings ===
Davis recorded for a number of labels, including NMC Recordings, Teldec and Deutsche Grammophon.

He conducted a solo album by mezzo-soprano Frederica von Stade, Frederica von Stade – Mahler Songs, of Mahler's Lieder eines fahrenden Gesellen, songs from Des Knaben Wunderhorn and Rückert-Lieder, with the London Philharmonic Orchestra for Columbia in 1978. In 1987 he recorded Handel's Messiah in an arrangement that he had made for symphony orchestra, with Kathleen Battle, Florence Quivar, John Aler, Samuel Ramey and the Toronto Symphony Orchestra, by EMI. He made a critically acclaimed recording of Birtwistle's opera, The Mask of Orpheus. A recording of Alban Berg's Violin Concerto and Three Pieces for Orchestra with the BBC SO was released in 2022.

Davis recorded a series with the BBC SO and Chorus of music by British composers for Teldec, The British Line. It was reissued as a 16-CD retrospective by Warner Classics. He also recorded works by Hector Berlioz, Arthur Bliss, York Bowen (nominated for a 2012 Grammy in 2012 in the category Best Orchestral Performance), Frederick Delius, Elgar (2018 Diapason d'Or in the category symphonic music), Gerald Finzi, Eugene Aynsley Goossens, Percy Grainger, Handel (nominated for a 2018 Grammy for Best Choral Performance), Gustav Holst, Charles Ives, and Jules Massenet (2021 JUNO Award for Best Classical Album: Vocal or Choral).

==== Videos ====
In the 1992 DVD Glyndebourne Festival Opera: A Gala Evening, recorded live by Arthaus Musik, Davis contributed several sections conducting the London Philharmonic Orchestra, including Montserrat Caballé as Verdi's Desdemona.

Cultural offices
Preceded by Bernard Haitink	Music Director, Glyndebourne Opera Festival; 1988–2000	Succeeded by Vladimir Jurowski
Preceded by Bruno Bartoletti	Music Director, Lyric Opera of Chicago; 2000–2021	Succeeded by Enrique Mazzola
