= Mahler Symphony No. 4 (Claudio Abbado 1978 recording) =

- Deutsche Grammophon CD 413 454-2

Studio album by Claudio Abbado
- Released: 1978
- Studio: Grosser Saal, Musikverein, Vienna
- Genre: Classical orchestral
- Length: 57:58
- Language: German
- Label: Deutsche Grammophon
- Producer: Rainer Brock

Mahler Symphony No. 4
- Deutsche Grammophon CD 437 011-2

The many recorded versions of Mahler's Symphony No. 4 include a 57-minute studio album that the operatic mezzo-soprano Frederica von Stade recorded with the Vienna Philharmonic Orchestra under the direction of Claudio Abbado. It was released in 1978.

== Recording ==
The album was recorded using analogue technology in May 1977 in the Grosser Saal (main auditorium) of the Musikverein in Vienna.

== Packaging ==
The covers of the first LP, cassette and CD versions of the album share the same photograph taken by Herbert Tobias of Hamburg. The cover of the Abbado Edition release of the album, designed under the art direction of Hartmut Pfeiffer, features a photograph of Abbado taken by G. Baroni.

== Critical reception ==
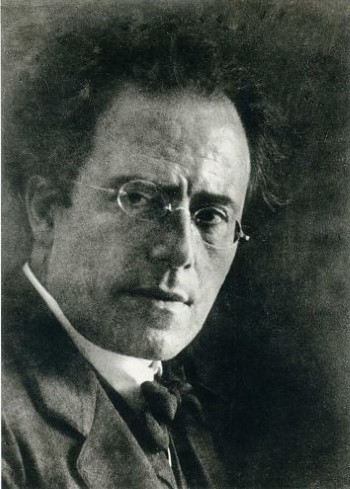
Gustav Mahler, photographed by Friedrich Victor Spitzer in 1905

=== Reviews ===
Richard Osborne reviewed the album on LP in Gramophone in June 1978, comparing it with alternative versions of the "symphony of heavenly life" conducted by Otto Klemperer, Rafael Kubelik, James Levine and George Szell. Claudio Abbado's reading of the first movement, he wrote, was straightforward, colourful and likeable. Like Szell, Abbado opened with a tempo that was animated without being flustered, and he was meticulous in his obedience to Mahler's accents and dynamics. After a few minutes, though, the "apparently episodic" character of the movement caused him to lose sight of the wood for the trees. Where Szell had acknowledged the movement's "unity in diversity" with a "steady, treading pulse" that "[refused] to ignore the thrust of the downbeat", Abbado paced the score erratically. Figure 7 exemplified Abbado's "losing his way" at a point where Szell had managed to allow himself a liberal rubato without disrupting the music's fundamental rhythm.

In the second movement, the Scherzo, Abbado was more successful. His unhurried reading was "wonderfully well shaped and articulated, full of childish nightmares, with the two Trios beautifully poised and expansive". The passage following the second Trio was perhaps a little hesitant, but this was a minor failing. It was especially pleasant to hear a movement that could sound abrasive played without anything rebarbative about it. Levine's performance of the Scherzo was just as good, although the string section of his Chicago Symphony Orchestra and RCA's engineering were both inferior to what Abbado's disc provided.

Abbado's third movement was where his interpretation was at its most radical. Mahler had marked its opening as "Ruhevoll [peaceful], the long melodic line with its bell-like pizzicato imitative, Mahler told Bruno Walter, of 'recumbent stone figures, their arms crossed in eternal sleep on the tops of tombs'." Klemperer had "ungraciously and impatiently" adopted a tempo of crotchet = 72; Kubelik, a "limpid" crotchet = 56; Szell an "innig [intimate] and grave" crotchet = 52: Abbado began at crotchet = 40, in flagrant defiance of Mahler's wishes. Moreover, when, at Figure 2, Mahler stipulated that the tempo be changed from poco adagio to viel langsamer [much slower], Abbado actually accelerated from crotchet = 40 to crotchet = 46. There was no denying, however, that Abbado's handling of the movement was "affecting". The Vienna Philharmonic Orchestra, accustomed to the idiom of Bruckner, were able to cope with Abbado's pacing as if there was nothing in the least strange about it. They sounded "quite sublime", and played "with the utmost purity and eloquence". In a particular passage after Figure 11, their strings were "breathtakingly beautiful, warm, pure and intense in a way that no other string section ... could hope to surpass."

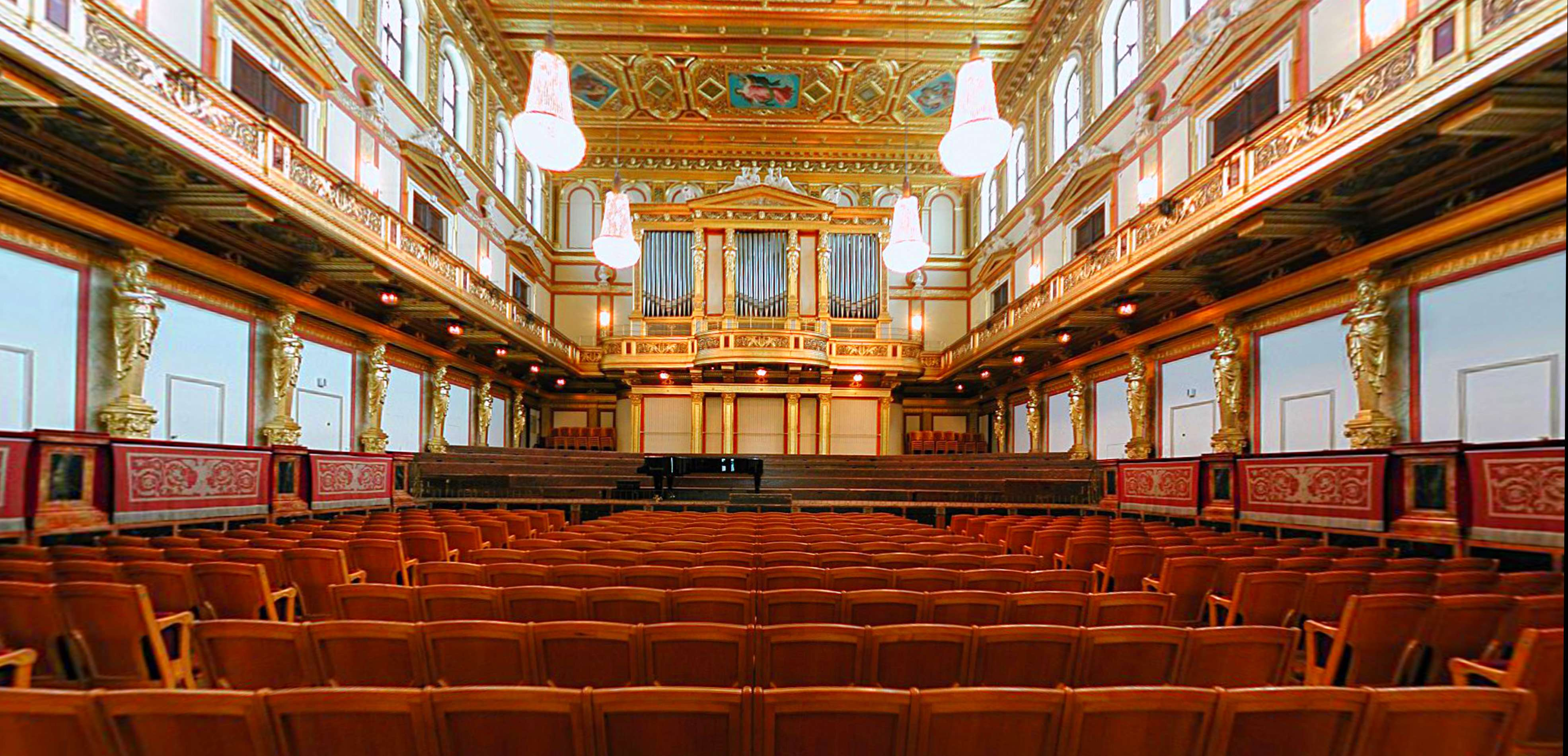
The Vienna Musikverein's Grosser or Goldener Saal (Great or Golden Hall)

Frederica von Stade's contribution to the fourth movement had both pluses and minuses. In her first few notes she seemed a little out of breath, and some of her staccati sounded contrived. But "the St Ursula phrase soars eloquently out, the voice has a true mezzo reach for the low B flats and the end, which Abbado conducts with an affecting quiet, has, as Mahler requests, a sweet, secretive intimacy."

The audio quality of Deutsche Grammophon's disc was first class, with the woodwinds in particular recorded exquisitely. Kubelik's version had a "mood of pastoral gaiety and childlike wonder", and Szell's album was a low-risk option for someone wanting to own just a single version of the work. Abbado's LP was for collectors interested in how a conductor could turn a piece of music into something very different from what its composer had imagined and make it fascinatingly new.

Eric Salzman reviewed the album on LP in Stereo Review in November 1978. Despite the advocacy of acolytes such as Bruno Walter, he wrote, Vienna had been slow to recognize that Gustav Mahler was on the same exalted level as Anton Bruckner. Leonard Bernstein had helped to open the city's ears to Mahler's genius, and Claudio Abbado, a former protégé of Bernstein's, was following in his footsteps. His reading of the Fourth Symphony explored a spectrum of sound and emotion that recalled Bernstein's way with Mahler without ever quite equalling Bernstein's extravagance. He captured "[Mahler's] long line with a sureness, delicacy and glow of feeling that is most moving".

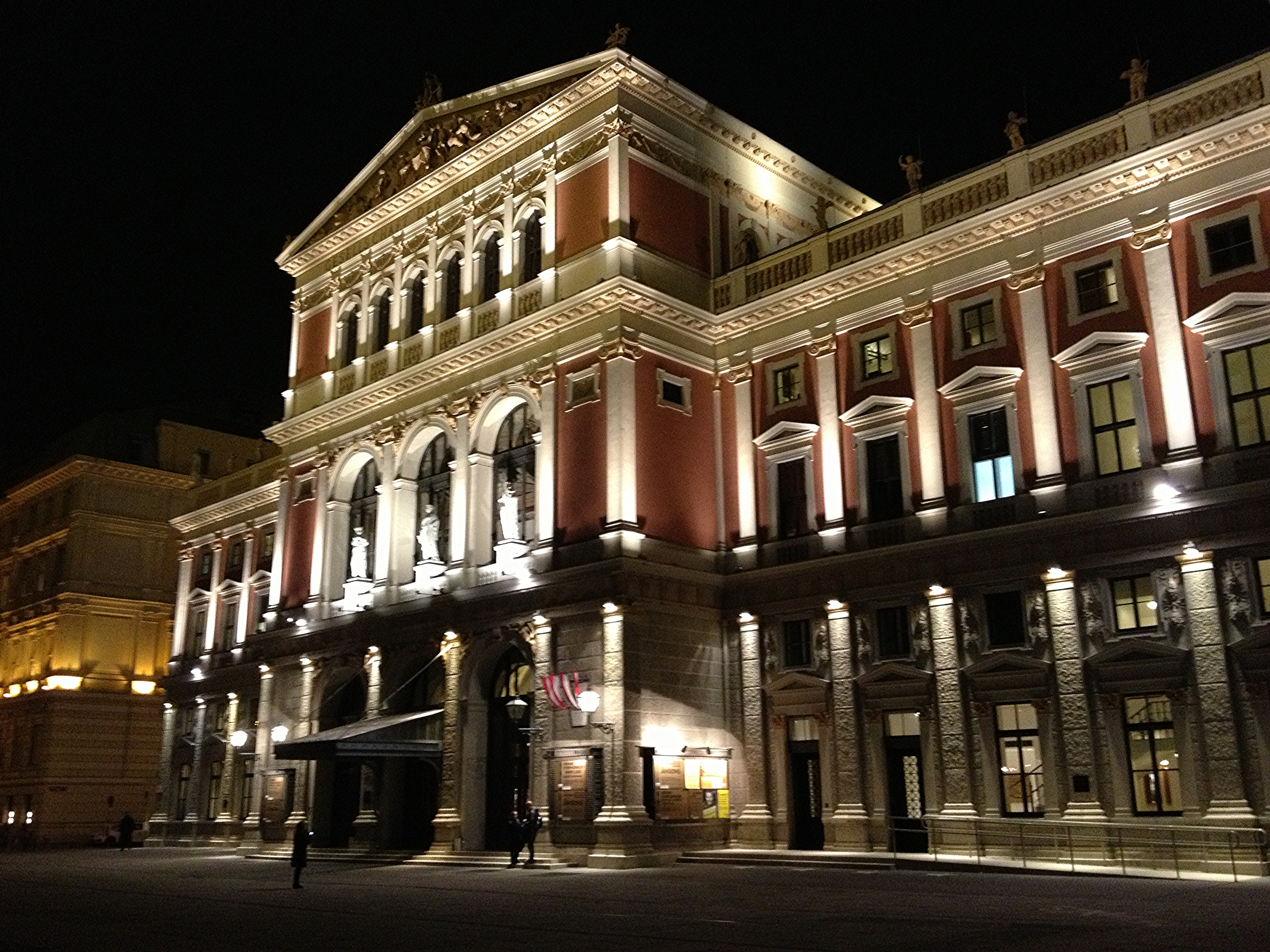
The Vienna Musikverein

None of Mahler's other symphonies was more Viennese in spirit than the Fourth, and the Vienna Philharmonic Orchestra was altogether at home in its radiant happiness. Their playing was "consistently wonderful without ever being lost in a welter of details". Frederica von Stade's performance of the final movement's Wunderhorn song did not spoil its innocent simplicity with unwarranted sophistication. The album as a whole was a genial, endearing addition to Mahler's discography. There had been a time when his music had been thought too difficult for anyone but a few specialists. The charm and accessibility of Abbado's disc made it easy to imagine that the composer's popularity would continue to grow, in Vienna as elsewhere.

Richard Osborne revisited the album in Gramophone in November 1984, when it had been issued on a "luminously clear" CD. Its promotion to the superior format had made him listen to it with new ears. "Much more than on LP", he wrote, he was "aware of the brilliance of Mahler's scoring and of the VPO's re-creation of it. There is also much pleasure to be derived from the rapture of the Viennese strings in the slow movement and the boyish freshness and charm of Frederica von Stade in the fourth movement." This said, he still found some of Claudio Abbado's conducting questionable, and a recently released rival CD of the symphony conducted by Klaus Tennstedt was probably a better buy.

=== Accolade ===
Stereo Review classed the album as a "Recording of Special Merit".

== CD track listing ==
Gustav Mahler (1860-1911)

Symphony No. 4 (1901), traditional text from Des Knaben Wunderhorn

- 1 (16:05) Bedächtig, Nicht eilen
- 2 (9:11) In gemächlicher Bewegung, Ohne Hast
- 3 (23:26) Ruhevoll
- 4 (9:03) Sehr behaglich

== Personnel ==
=== Musical ===
- Frederica von Stade, mezzo-soprano
- Gerhart Hetzel, violin
- Vienna Philharmonic Orchestra
- Claudio Abbado (1933-2014), conductor

=== Other ===
- Rainer Brock, producer
- Günter Hermanns, engineer

== Release history ==
In 1978, Deutsche Grammophon released the album on LP with texts and translations, and with notes by Constantin Floros and Richard Osborne (catalogue number 2530 966). The album was also issued on cassette (catalogue number 3300 966).

In 1984, Deutsche Grammophon issued the album on CD (catalogue number 413 454-2) with a 20-page insert booklet including photographs of Mahler, Abbado and von Stade, the text of the fourth movement's song in English, French, German and Italian, notes by Richard Osborne in English, notes by Paul-Gilbert Langevin in French and notes by Constantin Floros in German and Italian. Subsequently Deutsche Grammophon reissued the album on a remastered "Abbado Edition" CD (catalogue number 437 011-2) with a 24-page insert booklet including photographs of Mahler and Abbado, the same texts and notes as its predecessor and an open letter to Abbado from Deutsche Grammophon's president. This CD was also available with twenty-four other Abbado recordings in a complete Abbado Edition box set (catalogue number 437 000-2). Both the single CD and the box set were available on cassette (catalogue numbers 437 011-4 and 437 000-4 respectively). In 1996, Deutsche Grammophon issued the album in a 2-CD set coupled with a version of Mahler's Symphony No. 2 that Abbado had recorded with Carol Neblett, Marilyn Horne and the Chicago Symphony Orchestra (catalogue number 453 037-2). In 2012, Deutsche Grammophon reissued the album on CD in their Virtuoso Series (catalogue number 478 423 5).
