= Orchestre national d'Île-de-France =

French orchestra

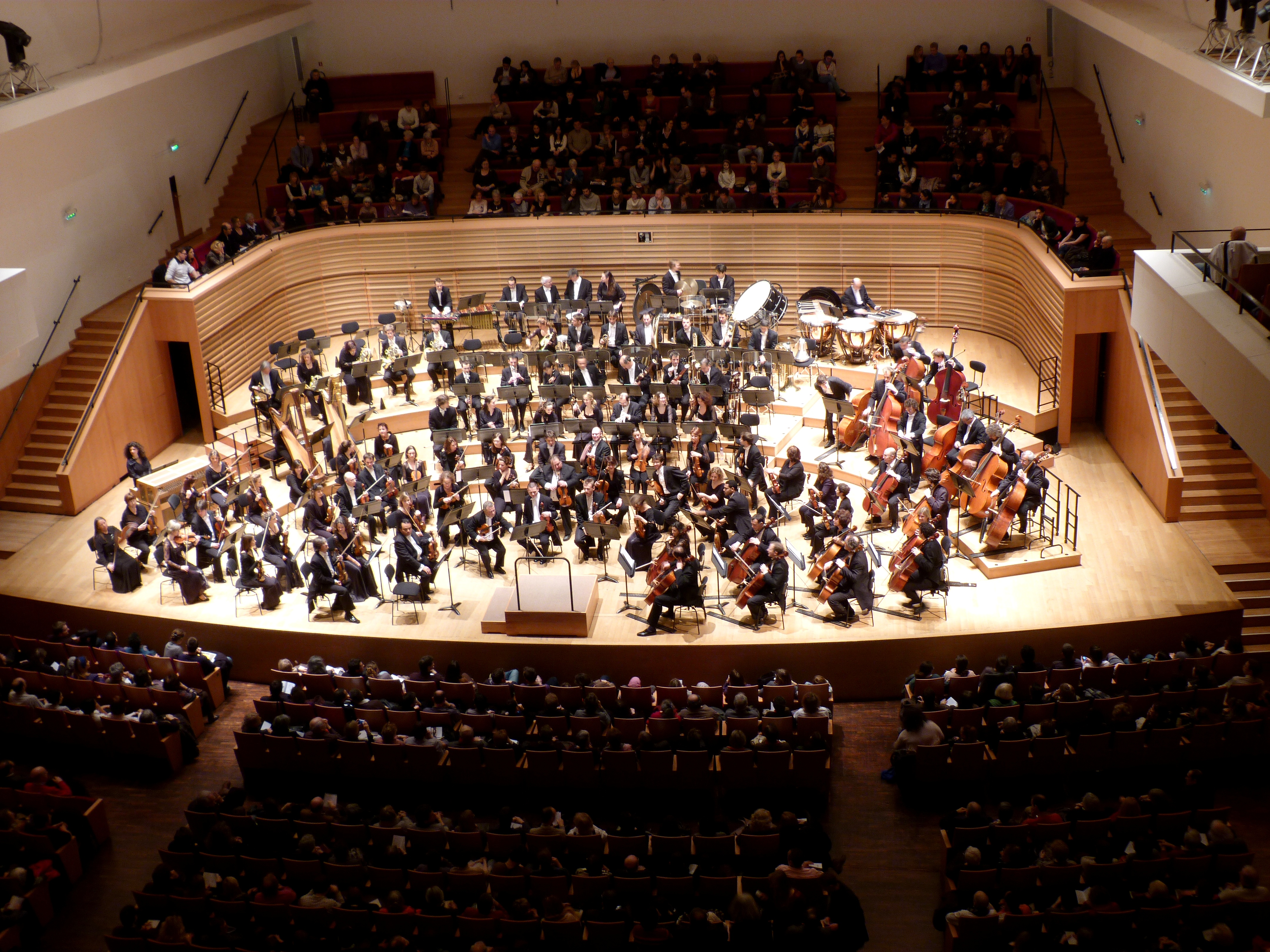
L'orchestre national d'Île de France at the salle Pleyel in January 2011.

The Orchestre national d'Île-de-France is a French symphony orchestra with its administrative base in Alfortville. The orchestra, made up of ninety-five permanent musicians, gives around a hundred concerts each season. The orchestra receives funding from the Conseil régional d’Île-de-France and the French Ministry of Culture. The orchestra gives concerts in a number of cities and venues, including the following:

- Philharmonie de Paris, Alfortville, Paris
- Théâtre Alexandre Dumas, Saint-Germain-en-Laye
- Théâtre Espace Coluche, Plaisir
- Théâtre Romain Rolland, Villejuif
- Opéra de Massy, Massy
- Centre culturel Jacques Prévert, Villeparisis
- Théâtre Sénart, Lieusaint
- Centre des Bords de Marne, Le Perreux-sur-Marne
- Conservatoire Jean-Baptiste Lully, Puteaux
- Centre culturel Saint-Ayoul, Provins
- Centre culturel Le Forum, Chauny

== History ==
The precursor orchestra to the current ensemble was the Orchestre symphonique d'Île de France. In 1974, at the instigation of the culture minister Marcel Landowski, this orchestra was reorganised into the Orchestre national d'Île-de-France. Since 1996, the orchestra has been administratively situated in Alfortville.

Past music directors include Jacques Mercier (1982-2002), Yoel Levi (2005-2012), and Enrique Mazzola (2012-2019). The current music director is Case Scaglione, starting with the 2019-2020 season. In January 2021, the orchestra announced the extension of Scaglione's contract as music director through 2026. Scaglione is scheduled to stand down as the orchestra's music director at the close of the 2026-2027 season.

In September 2025, the orchestra announced the appointment of Pablo González as its next music director, effective with the 2027-2028 season, with an initial contract of four seasons.

== Music directors ==
- Jean Fournet (1974–1982)
- Jacques Mercier (1982–2002)
- Yoel Levi (2005–2012)
- Enrique Mazzola (2012–2019)
- Case Scaglione (2019–present)
