= Case Scaglione =

American conductor (born 1982)

Case Scaglione (born 1982) is an American conductor who serves as the chief conductor of the Württembergisches Kammerorchester Heilbronn and music director of Orchestre national d'Île-de-France.

== Biography ==
Scaglione is a native of Houston. He earned his BA in Orchestra Performance at the Cleveland Institute of Music and studied conducting with Gustav Meier at the Peabody Institute of Music.

In 2008, at the age of 26, Scaglione became the music director of the Young Musicians Foundation Debut Orchestra of Los Angeles and continued the role through 2011. Shortly after he began his role with the orchestra, he was awarded the 2009 James Conlon Conductor Prize by the American Academy of Conducting at Aspen. He also received the 2010 Aspen Conducting Prize.

In 2011, he was awarded the Conductor's Prize by the Solti Foundation U.S. and in the same year, he was appointed as the assistant conductor of the New York Philharmonic. He was eventually elevated to the associate conductor of the orchestra in 2014. Scaglione was elected as the chief conductor of the Württembergisches Kammerorchester Heilbronn in 2018. One year later, he was named music director designate of the Orchestre National d'Île-de France for the 2019/20 season.

Scaglione has conducted and performed especially in Europe including NDR Elbphilharmonie Orchester, the Brussels Philharmonic, the Philharmonie Luxembourg, the Szczecin Philharmonic, the Luzerner Sinfonieorchester, the Bournemouth Symphony Orchestra, the RTVE Symphony Orchestra, the Castile and León Symphony Orchestra, the RTÉ National Symphony Orchestra and the Ulster Orchestra. In the spring of 2022, he made his Opéra national de Paris debut in a production of Elektra by Richard Strauss, stepping in for Semyon Bychkov in the last three performances. In the United States, he has appeared with the Houston Symphony, the Dallas Symphony Orchestra, the Detroit Symphony Orchestra, the Phoenix Symphony, the San Diego Symphony and the Baltimore Symphony Orchestra. on April 18 and 19, 2025, he conducted works by Lili Boulanger, Max Bruch and Beethoven with the Cincinnati Symphony Orchestra.
