= Yoel Levi =

Israeli musician and conductor (born 1950)

Yoel Levi (Hebrew: יואל לוי; born 16 August 1950) is an Israeli musician and conductor.

== Early life ==
Born in Romania, Levi grew up in Israel.

He studied at the Tel Aviv Academy of Music, receiving a Master of Arts degree with distinction. He continued studies at the Jerusalem Academy of Music with Mendi Rodan. He also studied with Franco Ferrara in Siena and Rome, with Kirill Kondrashin in the Netherlands, and at the Guildhall School of Music and Drama in London.

== Career ==
Levi won first prize at the International Besançon Competition for Young Conductors in 1978. He spent six years with the Cleveland Orchestra, from 1978 to 1984, as assistant conductor to Lorin Maazel, and with the title of resident conductor from 1980 to 1984. He became music director of the Atlanta Symphony Orchestra in 1988 and held the post until 2000, when he was succeeded by Robert Spano. With the Atlanta Symphony, Levi made several commercial recordings for Telarc, including music of Samuel Barber, Aaron Copland, Miklos Rozsa, Shostakovich, and Mussorgsky. Following his Atlanta music directorship, he held the title of music director emeritus of the Atlanta Symphony from 2000 to 2005.

Outside of the United States, Levi was Principal Conductor of the Brussels Philharmonic from 2001 to 2007. He became principal guest conductor of the Israel Philharmonic Orchestra in 2001, the first Israeli with that title. Levi served as Principal Conductor of the Orchestre national d'Île-de-France from 2005 to 2012. In August 2013, Levi was named the next music director and principal conductor of the KBS Symphony Orchestra in South Korea, effective January 2014, with an initial contract of 2 years. He concluded his tenure in 2019.

In 2021 he was appointed music director and chief conductor of The Haifa Symphony Orchestra.

== Honors ==
In 1997, Levi was awarded an honorary Doctor of Fine Arts Degree by Oglethorpe University in Atlanta and also gave the commencement address.

In June 2001, he was named Ordre des Arts et des Lettres by the French Government.

== Personal life ==
Levi and his wife Jackie Perelman have three sons: Eyal Levi, a musician with the death metal band DÅÅTH; Amir Levi, an actor and theater director; and Daniel Levi, a drummer.

== See also ==
- Mahler: Symphony No. 4 (Yoel Levi recording)

Cultural offices
Preceded by Robert Shaw	Music Director, Atlanta Symphony Orchestra; 1988–2000	Succeeded by Robert Spano
Preceded by Frank Shipway	Principal Conductor, Brussels Philharmonic; 2001–2007	Succeeded by Michel Tabachnik
Preceded by Jacques Mercier	Music Director, Orchestre national d'Île-de-France; 2005–2012	Succeeded by Enrique Mazzola
Preceded by Shin-ik Hahm	Music Director and Principal Conductor, KBS Symphony Orchestra; 2014–2019	Succeeded by Pietari Inkinen
