= Frederica von Stade – Mahler Songs =

Mahler Songs
- Columbia LP, M-35863

Studio album by Frederica von Stade
- Released: 1979
- Recorded: 1978
- Studio: Abbey Road Studio, London
- Genre: Classical vocal
- Length: 40:59
- Language: German
- Label: Columbia Records
- Producer: Paul Walter Myers

Mahler Songs is a 40-minute studio album on which Gustav Mahler's Lieder eines fahrenden Gesellen, his Rückert-Lieder and two of the songs from his Lieder aus "Des Knaben Wunderhorn" are performed by Frederica von Stade and the London Philharmonic Orchestra under the direction of Andrew Davis. It was released in 1979.

== Recording ==
The album was recorded using analogue technology on 8, 15 and 16 December 1978 in Abbey Road Studios, London. On 14 December 1978, von Stade, Davis and the London Philharmonic included the Gesellen songs in a concert given in London's Royal Festival Hall.

== Cover art ==
The LP and cassette versions of the album share the same cover, designed by Allen Weinberg, featuring a photograph of von Stade taken by Valérie Clément.

== Critical reception ==
=== Reviews ===
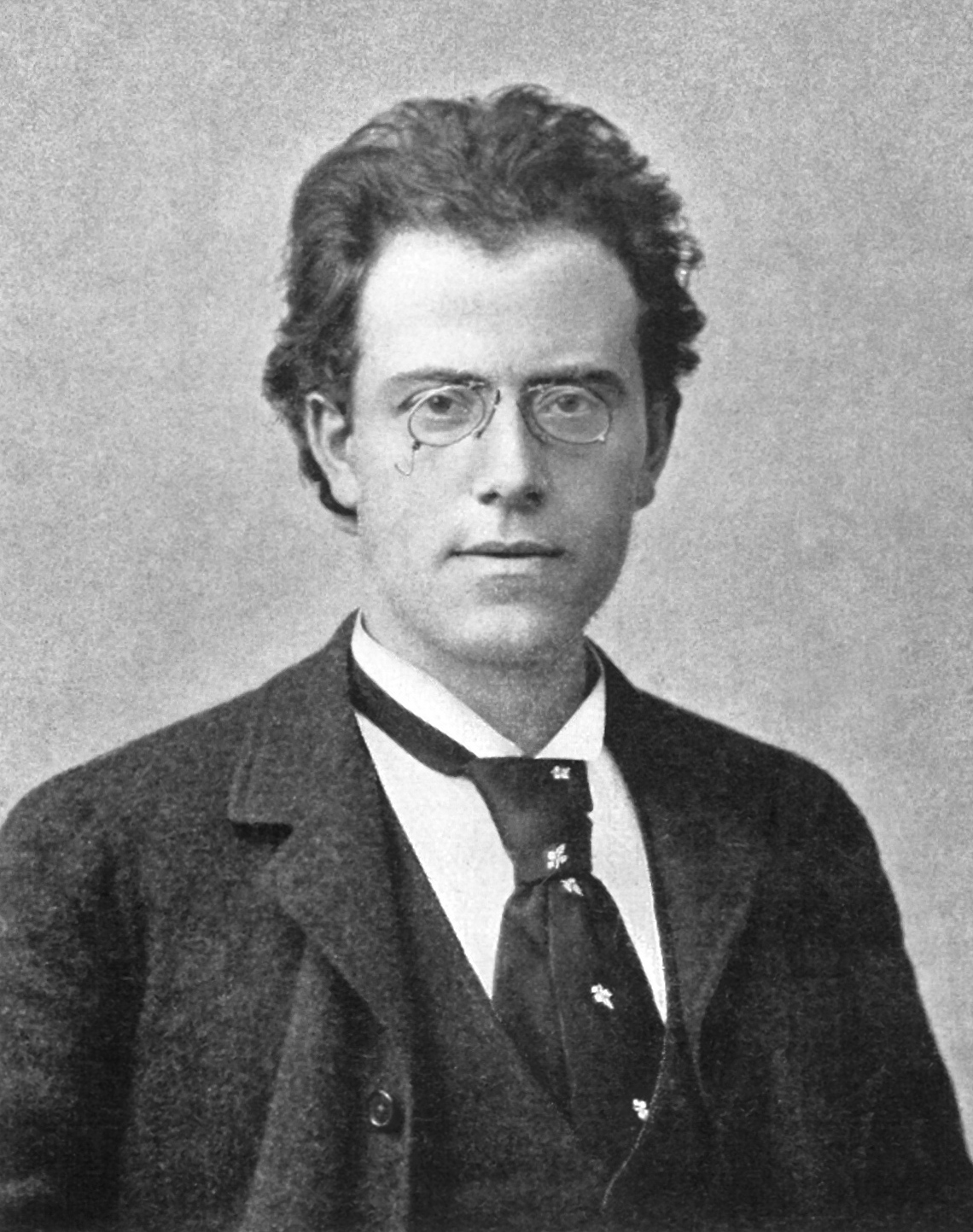
Gustav Mahler in 1892

J. B. Steane reviewed the album on LP in Gramophone in November 1979, comparing it with recordings of some of Mahler's Lieder sung by Janet Baker, Marilyn Horne, Christa Ludwig and Yvonne Minton. None of the five could be recommended unequivocally, he wrote, but the best of them was Baker's. Her disc was not perfect, but it was emotionally profound, impossible to forget and lovely to listen to. It was true that Ludwig's Berlin Philharmonic played better than Baker's New Philharmonia, but Ludwig's own performance was inferior to Baker's both in beauty of tone and in interpretation. Von Stade's album was slightly disappointing too, although marginally preferable to Horne's.

Mahler had not conceived his Rückert-Lieder as a group, leaving singers in a quandary as to the best order in which to present them. Horne and von Stade both began with "Ich atmet' einen linden Duft", depriving themselves of the opportunity to put the song in a place where it would have "the delicious effect of a window opened to let in air, light and fragrance". They were arguably unwise, too, in their siting of "Um Mitternacht". Horne jammed it up against "Ich bin der Welt abhanden gekommen", maladroitly linking the collection's two deepest songs and so putting the balance of the work as a whole out of kilter. Von Stade sang it before "Blicke mir nicht in die Lieder", thus casting a shadow on what was "perhaps the most charming and light-hearted" of the songs. Ludwig was more judicious. Her choice of opening was "Ich bin der Welt abhanden gekommen". It might seem odd to begin with a piece about renunciation, but by starting with the most beautiful of the Rückert-Lieder, she created the best atmosphere for her performance of the rest of the songs. She put "Liebst du um Schönheit" second, the sunnier "Blicke mir nicht in die Lieder" third and the Arcadian "Ich atmet' einen linden Duft" fourth. Leaving "Um Mitternacht" to the very end meant that she avoided the difficulty of deciding what could possibly succeed its "solemnity and broad, powerful climax".

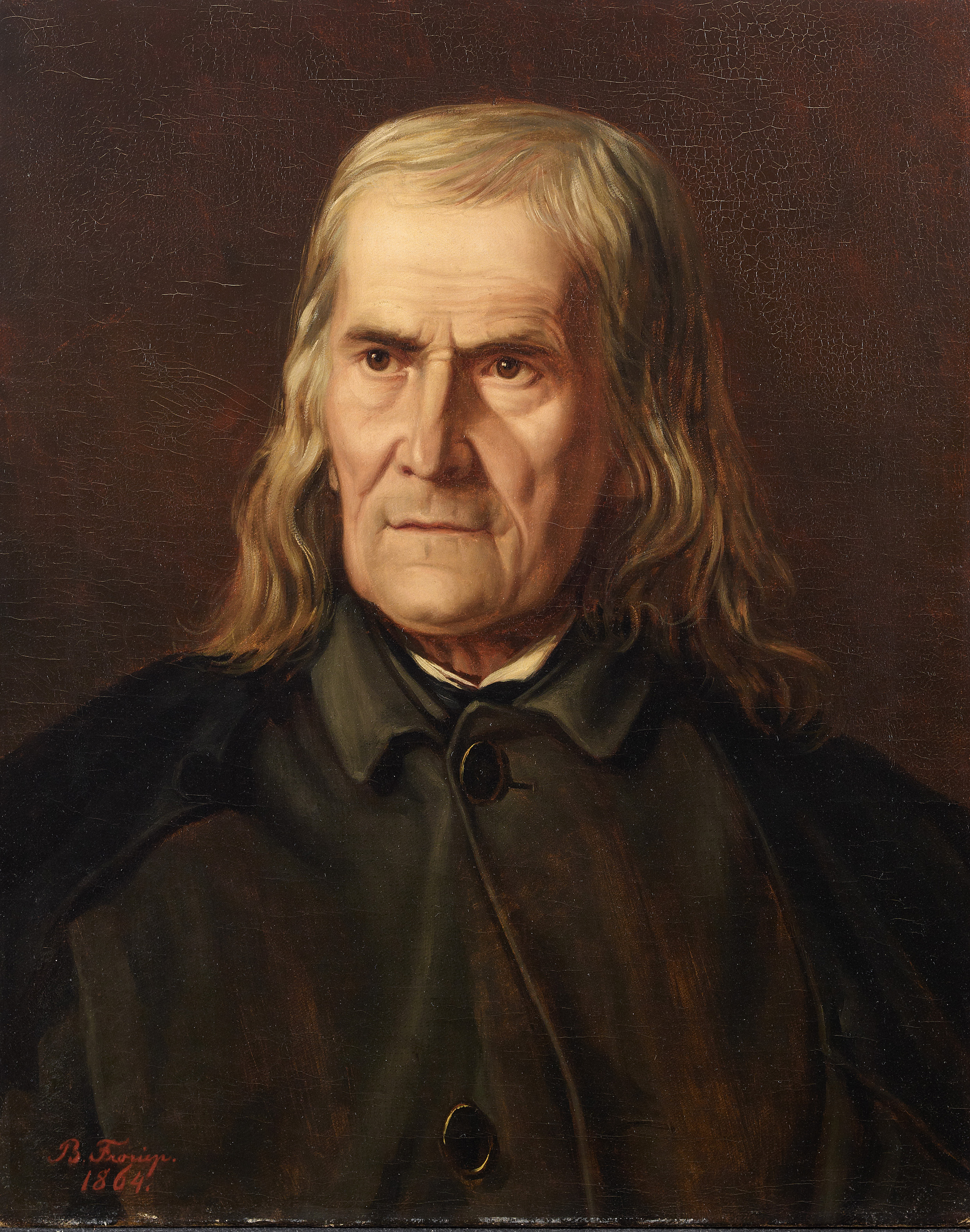
Friedrich Rückert

In addition to its intelligent sequencing, Ludwig's disc had the advantage of the excellent accompaniment provided by her Berlin Philharmonic. None of the rival album's orchestras were as good as the Berliners in conveying the "stillness and privacy" of the songs. Herbert von Karajan's "solo instruments interleave against a still background, oboe, horn, flute each raising its voice in turn with the utmost beauty of sound and feeling for the shape of the phrase". Horne had less meticulous support from the Los Angeles Philharmonic under Zubin Mehta. Andrew Davis's creative conducting elicited luscious playing from the London Philharmonic for von Stade, but Columbia's engineering denied him the same "sense of stillness and space" that Herbert von Karajan, the Berliners and Deutsche Grammophon provided for Ludwig.

The greatest asset of Baker's disc was her own contribution to it. Von Stade, by contrast, got off to a bad start with her "Ich atmet' einen linden Duft", "not rising ... to the 'linden' very gracefully, and indulging too much in the habit of opening out individual notes in succession, 'squeezing' rather than 'binding'." There were points at which she sang well: "in 'Ich bin der Welt abhanden gekommen', the phrase 'ich sei gestorben' is most beautifully floated", and in "Liebst du um Schönheit", she brought more impulsiveness to "o ja, mich liebe!" than any of her rivals. But she did not have the vocal heft to cope with "Um Mitternacht" satisfactorily, and in quieter music, she was sometimes too laid back.

"Um Mitternacht" did certainly not overtax Marilyn Horne, who sang it with "some of the richness and depth of tone" for which she was celebrated. Her "Liebst du um Schönheit" had some fondness, and there was a "velvety gentleness" in the way in which she expressed the comfort of "und ruh in einem stillen Gebiet" in "Ich bin der Welt abhanden gekommen". But there were points at which the meaning of the music was not transmitted, and Decca's recording emphasized her vibrato and breathing. Christa Ludwig's reading was more effective poetically, but her tone was somewhat flawed by the deficiencies of her vocal production.

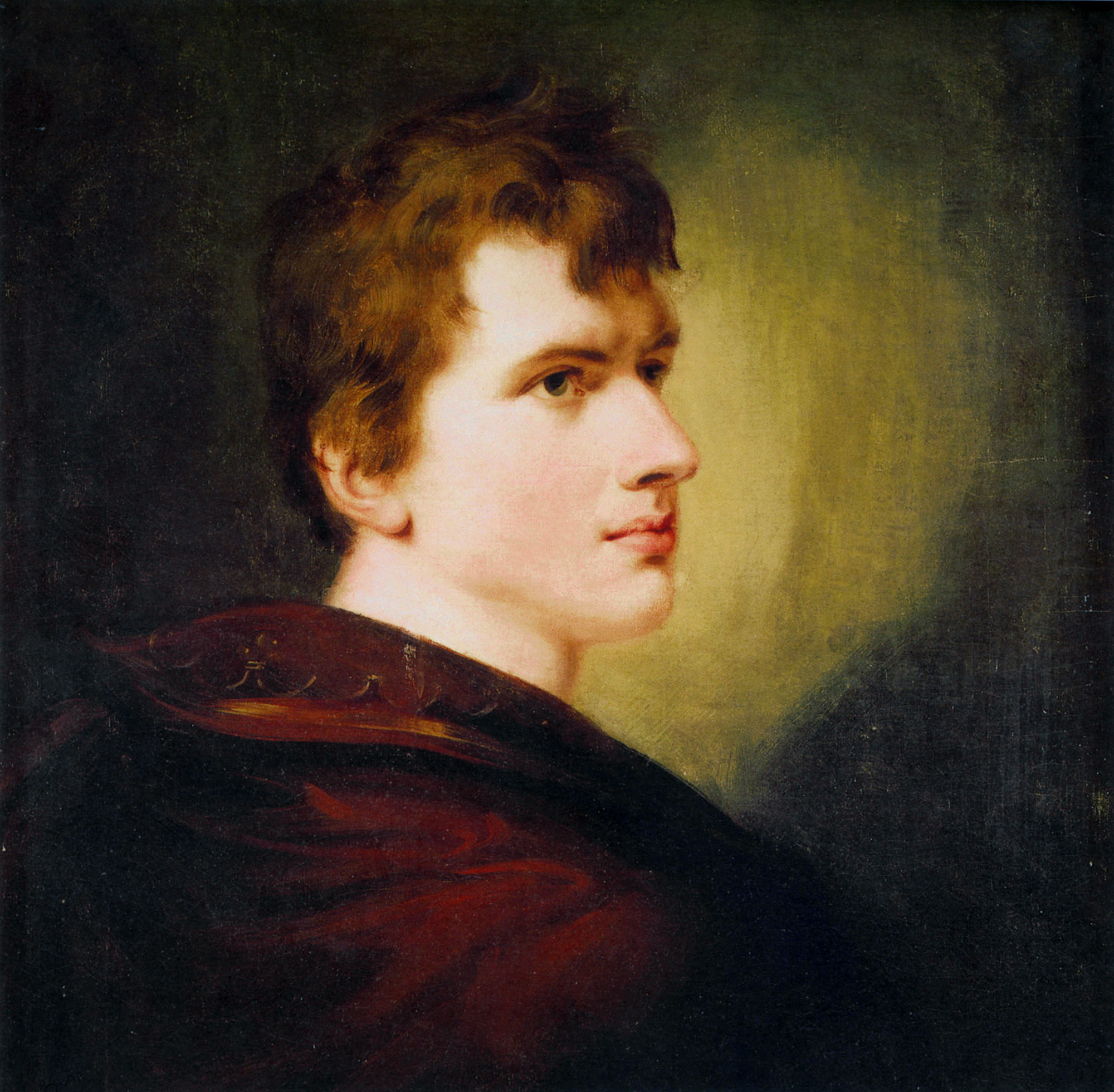
Achim von Arnim, painted by Peter Edward Stroehling in 1818

Von Stade sang better in the Gesellen cycle than in the Rückert-Lieder, in some passages outdoing even Baker. Her "Ging heut' Morgen über's Feld" went with "a spring, instead of that curiously lolloping tread" perpetrated by Baker's conductor, John Barbirolli. In "Wenn mein Schatz Hochzeit macht" too, von Stade had none of Baker's and Barbirolli's heavy-handedness. Conducting for Yvonne Minton, Georg Solti elicited an accompaniment that seemed to taunt that song's rejected lover: while Minton sang of heartbreak, Solti's Chicago Symphony Orchestra celebrated the prospect of the wedding over which Minton was grieving. In "Ich hab' ein glühend Messer", Solti's Chicagoans provided a bite and virtuosity unequalled by any of their competitors. Like "Um Mitternacht", this song demanded more from von Stade than she was able to deliver, although she made up for her lack of decibels by "the tenseness of her tone in the more turbulent passages". She was just as skillful in the first song of the cycle, colouring her voice "most resourcefully and movingly". Marilyn Horne was less compelling in the Gesellen songs than she was in the Rückert-Lieder, singing the first song with an "oddly incohesive line by line effect" and often mispronouncing her short "i" so as to turn "ist" into "eest".

In the little comedy of "Rheinlegendchen", von Stade told the story with a "gawky tone and style" which Steane found unappealing.

The album was favorably reviewed by Peter G. Davis in the New York Times: "Miss von Stade ... sounds utterly absorbed in Mahler's aching world of nostalgia and regret, while the burnished beauty and fragile vulnerability of her voice communicates with every note."

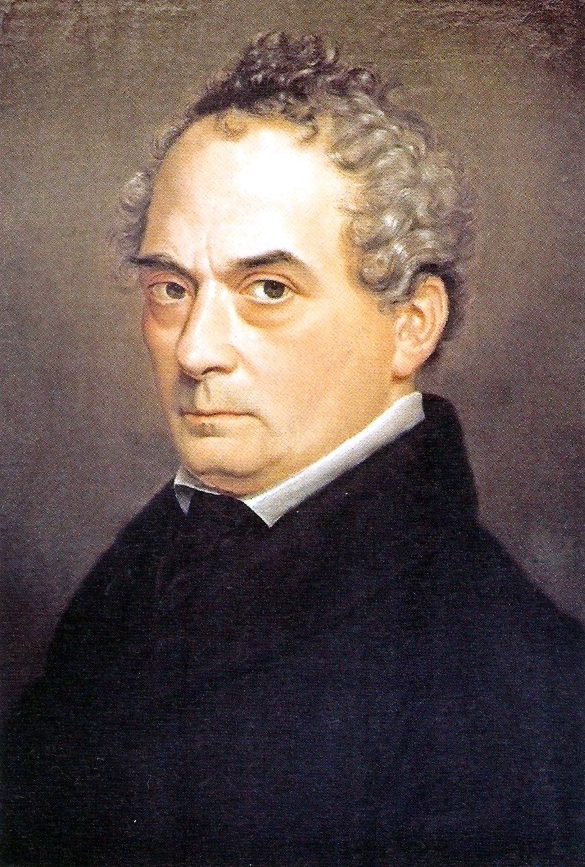
Clemens Brentano, painted by Emilie Linder (1835).

George Jellinek reviewed the album on LP in Stereo Review in October 1980. Frederica von Stade, he wrote, was a perfect choice to sing Massenet, Mozart or Rossini, and was just as suited to the tormented music of Gustav Mahler, with its idiosyncratic mixture of simplicity and artifice. Not one of the fruity, contralto-like mezzo-sopranos usually assigned to Mahler's vocal output, von Stade performed his songs with a lightness of tone, downplaying the high emotions of Lieder eines fahrenden Gesellen and conveying the innocent naïveté of the ditties from Des Knaben Wunderhorn.

Her words were "clearly articulated and sensitively ccloured for expression", and she revealed the minutiae of Mahler's scores "with the accuracy of a master instrumentalist". There were times, indeed, when her interpretations could seem more carefully prepared than was desirable. For example, there were "cutesy" effects in the "Rheinlegendchen" which would enthrall some listeners but leave others wishing that von Stade had eschewed them and relied on her innate charm instead.

Technically, her performances were full of things for the connoisseur of singing to enjoy. For instance, there was her immaculate bel canto filigree in "Wer hat dies Liedlein erdacht?", and her gorgeous legato phrasing of the lines "Liebst du um Liebe, o ja, mich liebe!" in "Liebst du um Schönheit" and "Sie mag so glauben ich sei gestorben" in "Ich bin der Welt abhanden gekommen". The only place at which her control faltered was in "Um Mitternacht", the most exacting song on her album.

The London Philharmonic accompanied her very well, and their skill in eliciting the lambent colours of Mahler's scores was equalled by that of Columbia's production team. Conducting, Andrew Davis made no serious mistakes, but he could have relaxed and smiled a little more in "Rheinlegendchen". His pacing seemed generally sensible despite being slightly quicker than was usual. Only in "Um Mitternacht" and "Ich bin der Welt abhanden gekommen" did one feel that his tempo was ill-judged - the lower metronome markings used by John Barbirolli and Zubin Mehta had allowed a their soloists to plumb profounder depths of feeling than von Stade had been able to access.

=== Accolade ===
In the 23rd annual Grammy Awards of 1980, the album was nominated for a Grammy for the Best Classical Vocal Soloist Performance.

== CD track listing ==
Gustav Mahler (1860-1911)

Lieder eines fahrenden Gesellen ("Songs of a wayfarer"), composed in 1884–1885, orchestrated and revised in the 1890s; with texts by Gustav Mahler

- 1 (3:46) "Wenn mein Schatz Hochzeit macht" ("When my sweetheart is married")
- 2 (4:22) "Ging heut' Morgen über's Feld" ("This morning I went over the field")
- 3 (3:23) "Ich hab' ein glühend Messer" ("I have a gleaming knife")
- 4 (5:29) "Die zwei blauen Augen von meinem Schatz" ("My sweetheart's two blue eyes")

Lieder aus "Des Knaben Wunderhorn" ("Songs from 'The boy's magic horn'") composed in 1892–1898; with traditional texts collected and edited by Achim von Arnim (1781-1831) and Clemens Brentano (1778-1842)

- 5 (3:01) "Rheinlegendchen" ("Little Rhein legend")
- 6 (2:06) "Wer hat dies Liedlein erdacht?" ("Who thought up this little song?")

Rückert-Lieder ("Songs after Rückert"), composed in 1901–1902; with texts by Friedrich Rückert (1788-1866)

- 7 (2:17) "Ich atmet' einen linden Duft" ("I breathed a gentle scent")
- 8 (2:28) "Liebst du um Schönheit" ("If what you love is beauty")
- 9 (6:07) "Um Mitternacht" ("At midnight")
- 10 (1:37) "Blicke mir nicht in die Lieder" ("Don't look into my songs")
- 11 (6:22) "Ich bin der Welt abhanden gekommen" ("I've become lost to the world")

== Personnel ==
=== Musicians ===
- Frederica von Stade (b. 1945), mezzo-soprano
- London Philharmonic Orchestra
- Andrew Davis (1944-2024), conductor

=== Other ===
- Robert Gooch, engineer
- Mike Ross-Trevor, engineer
- Paul Walter Myers (1932-2015), producer

== Release history ==
Columbia released the album on LP in Europe (catalogue numbers 76828) and the US (catalogue number M-35863) in 1979 and on 1 June 1980 respectively. The LP had an insert with texts and translations, and sleeve notes (in English only) by Lionel Salter. The album was also released on cassette (catalogue numbers 40–76828 in Europe, MT-35863 in the US).

In 2012, Newton Classics issued the album on CD with a 16-page biographical booklet by David Patrick Stearns in their 4-CD collection Frederica von Stade: Duets, Arias, Scenes & Songs (catalogue number 8802125). In 2016, Sony issued the album on CD (in a miniature replica of its original LP sleeve) with a 52-page booklet in their 18-CD collection Frederica von Stade: The Complete Columbia Recital Albums (catalogue number 88875183412).
