= Mahler Symphony No. 4 discography =

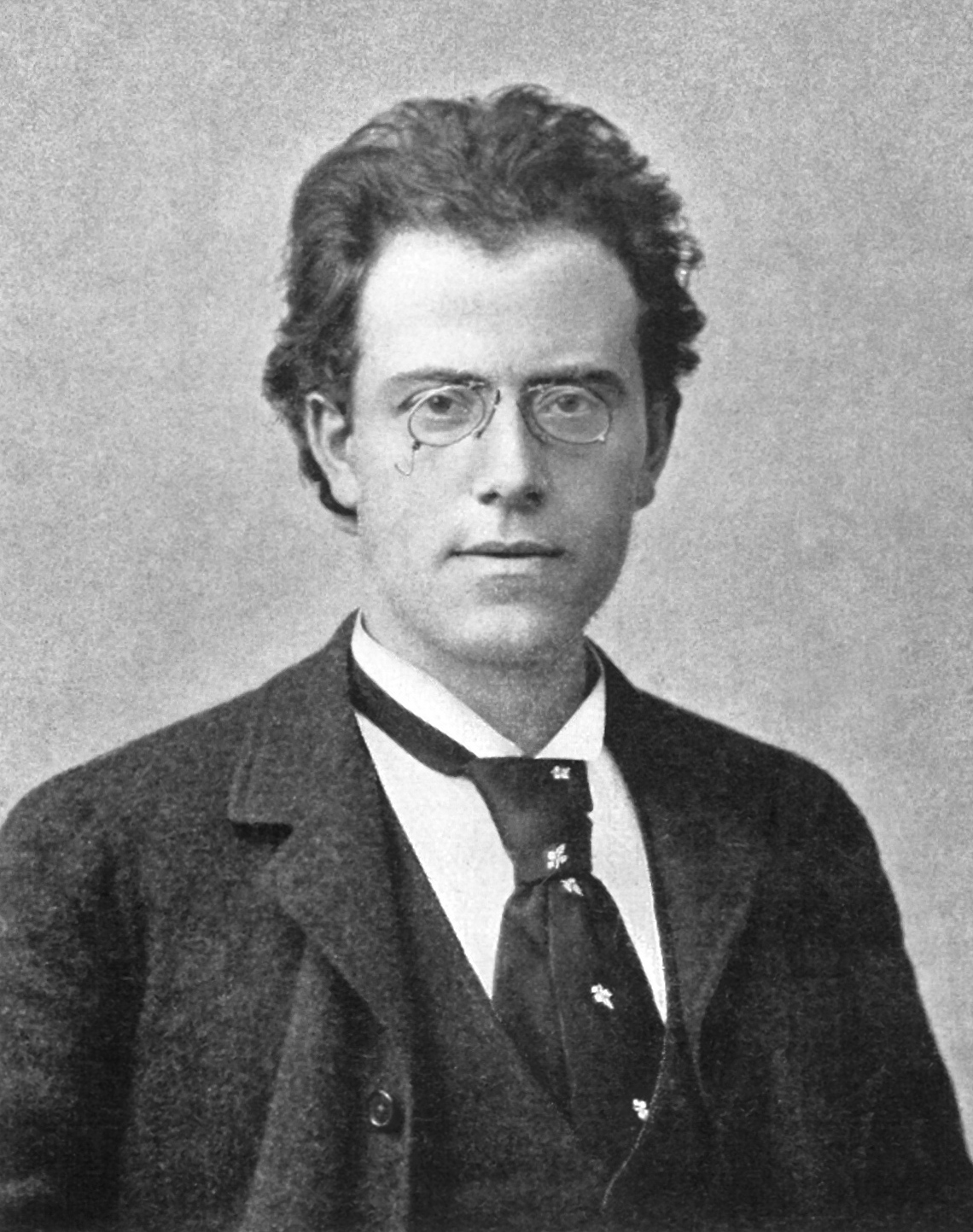
Gustav Mahler in 1892

This is a discography of audio recordings of Gustav Mahler's Fourth Symphony. The symphony premiered at the Kaim-Saal in Munich on 25 November 1901. The symphony's first recording in 1930 by Hidemaro Konoye and the New Symphony Orchestra of Tokyo is the first electrical recording of any Mahler symphony.

The tabular list below is of recordings by symphony orchestras of Mahler's full score. A separate list is provided, below the primary list of recordings of the full orchestra version, of chamber ensemble reductions of the work, principally of the version for 15 players by Erwin Stein.

== Recordings ==
=== Original full orchestra version ===
Year of release	Conductor	Orchestra	Soloist	Label	Catalog number (Note: Recordings are from Smoley 1996 unless otherwise cited.)	Notes
1930	Hidemaro Konoye	New Symphony Orchestra of Tokyo	Sakaye Kitasawa	Japanese Parlophone	E 10009/14	—
1939	Willem Mengelberg	Concertgebouw Orchestra	Jo Vincent	Philips Records	PHM 500-040	Live performance from November 1939
1948	Bruno Walter	New York Philharmonic	Dési von Halban	Columbia Records	11213-8D	—
1950	Karel Šejna	Czech Philharmonic	Maria Tauberová	Supraphon	SU40812	Album code from 2012 box set reissue
1952	Eduard van Beinum	Concertgebouw Orchestra	Margaret Ritchie	Decca	LXT 2718	—
1957	Paul Kletzki	Philharmonia Orchestra	Emmy Loose	EMI	35570	—
1957	Leopold Ludwig	Saxon State Orchestra	Anny Schlemm	Decca Records	DL 9944	—
1960	Fritz Reiner	Chicago Symphony Orchestra	Lisa Della Casa	RCA Records	LSC 2364	—
1962	Otto Klemperer	Philharmonia Orchestra	Elisabeth Schwarzkopf	Angel Records	S35829	—
1966	Leonard Bernstein	New York Philharmonic	Reri Grist	Columbia Masterworks Records	MS-6152	—
1966	Georg Solti	Concertgebouw Orchestra	Sylvia Stahlman	London Recordings	CS 6217	—
1966	George Szell	Cleveland Orchestra	Judith Raskin	Columbia Masterworks Records	MS-6833	—
1967	Bernard Haitink	Concertgebouw Orchestra	Elly Ameling	Philips Records	802 888 LY	—
1967	Lorin Maazel	Berlin Radio Symphony Orchestra	Heather Harper	Nonesuch Records	71259	—
1968	Maurice Abravanel	Utah Symphony	Netania Davrath	Vanguard Records	C-10042	—
1968	Rafael Kubelík	Bavarian Radio Symphony Orchestra	Elsie Morison	Deutsche Grammophon	DG 139339	—
1970	Jascha Horenstein	London Philharmonic Orchestra	Margaret Price	Classics for Pleasure	CFP 159	—
1972	Kirill Kondrashin	Moscow Philharmonic Orchestra	Galina Pisarenko	Melodiya	RCID17416511	CD reissue; fourth movement sung in Russian
1973	Hans Swarowsky	Czech Philharmonic	Gerlinde Lorenz	Supraphon	1101346	—
1974	James Levine	Chicago Symphony Orchestra	Judith Blegen	RCA Red Seal Records	ARL1-0895	—
1976	Bruno Walter	Vienna Philharmonic	Elisabeth Schwarzkopf	Bruno Walter Society	2-705	Live performance of 29 May 1960, Vienna Konzerthaus
1978	Claudio Abbado	Vienna Philharmonic	Frederica von Stade	Deutsche Grammophon	DG 2530 966	—
1979	Harold Farberman	London Symphony Orchestra	Corinne Curry	Maybach Music Group	3-MMG 106X	—
1979	Herbert von Karajan	Berlin Philharmonic	Edith Mathis	Deutsche Grammophon	DG 419 863-2	—
1979	Zubin Mehta	Israel Philharmonic Orchestra	Barbara Hendricks	Decca	430 756-2	Album code is for 1992 CD reissue
1979	André Previn	Pittsburgh Symphony Orchestra	Elly Ameling	Angel Records	SZ-37576	—
1981	Václav Neumann	Czech Philharmonic	Magdaléna Hajóssyová	Supraphon Pro Arte	PAL 1068	—
1983	Klaus Tennstedt	London Philharmonic Orchestra	Lucia Popp	EMI/Angel	DS-37954	—
1984	Bernard Haitink	Concertgebouw Orchestra	Roberta Alexander	Philips Records	412 119-1	—
1984	Lorin Maazel	Vienna Philharmonic	Kathleen Battle	CBS Records	IM 39072	—
1984	Sir Georg Solti	Chicago Symphony Orchestra	Kiri Te Kanawa	London Recordings	LDR 410 188	—
1985	Bruno Walter	Vienna Philharmonic	Irmgard Seefried	Varèse Sarabande	VCD 47228	Live recording from 24 August 1950
1986	Eliahu Inbal	Frankfurt Radio Symphony	Helen Donath	Denon Records	33C37-7952	—
1986	Herbert Kegel	Leipzig Radio Symphony	Celestina Casapietra	Tokuma Japan Communications	32TC-101	—
1987	Jean-Claude Casadesus	Orchestre National de Lille	Margaret Marshall	Forlane	UCD 16563	—
1987	Gary Bertini	Cologne Radio Symphony	Lucia Popp	EMI Classics	CDC 7 54178	—
1988	Leonard Bernstein	Concertgebouw Orchestra	Helmut Wittek (boy soprano)	Deutsche Grammophon	DG 423607-1	—
1988	Michael Gielen	Southwest German Radio Symphony Orchestra	Christine Whittlesey	Saphir Records	INT 830.856	—
1988	Otto Klemperer	Cologne Radio Symphony	Elfriede Trötschel	Memoria	991-005	Live recording from 1954
1988	Seiji Ozawa	Boston Symphony Orchestra	Kiri Te Kanawa	Philips Records	422 072-2	—
1988	Franz Welser-Möst	London Philharmonic Orchestra	Felicity Lott	EMI Eminence	CD-EMX 2139	—
1989	Wyn Morris	London Symphony Orchestra	Patricia Rozario	Collins Classics	10442	—
1989	Anton Nanut	RTV Ljubljana Symphony Orchestra	Max Emanuel Cencic	Stradivari Classics	SCD-6050	—
1989	Bruno Walter	Orchestre National de France	Maria Stader	Nuova Era	2233	Live performance from 1955
1990	Michiyoshi Inoue	Royal Philharmonic Orchestra	Yvonne Kenny	ASV Records	ASV CD RPO 8017	—
1990	Leonard Bernstein	Vienna Philharmonic	Edith Mathis	Deutsche Grammophon	DG video 072 223	Concert performance from 1975
1990	Andrew Litton	Royal Philharmonic Orchestra	Ann Murray	Virgin Classics	Erato 3632772 (2006 reissue)	—
1990	Alexander Gibson	Royal Scottish National Orchestra	Margaret Marshall	Chandos	CHAN 6505	—
1990	Hiroshi Wakasugi	Tokyo Metropolitan Symphony Orchestra	Kiyomi Toyoda	Fontec	FOCD 9020	—
1990	Bruno Walter	New York Philharmonic	Irmgard Seefried	Music & Arts	CD 656	Live performance from 1953
1991	Milan Horvat	Zagreb Radio and TV Symphony	Éva Andor	Digital Concerto	2 CCT 731-2	—
1991	Neeme Järvi	Royal Scottish Orchestra	Linda Finnie	Chandos Records	CHAN 8951	—
1991	Armin Jordan	Orchestre de la Suisse Romande	Edith Wiens	Erato Records	2292–45628	—
1991	Otto Klemperer	Bavarian Radio Symphony Orchestra	Elisabeth Lindermeier	Arkadia Records	2 CDHP 590	Live performance from 19 October 1956
1991	Neville Marriner	Stuttgart Radio Symphony Orchestra	Mitsuko Shirai	Capriccio	10358	—
1991	Stanisław Skrowaczewski	Hallé Orchestra	Alison Hargan	IMP Classics	PCD 972	—
1991	Shunsaku Tsutsumi	Tokyo Philharmonic Orchestra	Ruri Usami	Ray	FHCR-1001	—
1991	Bruno Walter	Vienna Philharmonic	Hilde Güden	Deutsche Grammophon	DG 435 334	Live recording from 1955
1992	John Barbirolli	BBC Symphony Orchestra	Heather Harper	Intaglio	INCD 7291	Live recording from 1967
1992	Esa-Pekka Salonen	Los Angeles Philharmonic	Barbara Hendricks	Sony Classical Records	SK 48380	—
1992	Antoni Wit	Polish National Radio Symphony Orchestra	Lynda Russell	Naxos Records	8.550527	—
1993	James Conlon	Gürzenich Orchestra Cologne	Soile Isokoski	EMI Classics	CDC 4 78235-2	—
1993	Bernard Haitink	Berlin Philharmonic	Sylvia McNair	Philips Records	434 123-2	—
1993	Giuseppe Sinopoli	Philharmonia Orchestra	Edita Gruberová	Deutsche Grammophon	DG 437 527	—
1994	Christoph von Dohnányi	Cleveland Orchestra	Dawn Upshaw	London Recordings	440 315	—
1994	Hartmut Haenchen	Netherlands Philharmonic Orchestra	Alexandra Coku	LaserLight	14 139	—
1995	Edo de Waart	Radio Filharmonisch Orkest	Charlotte Margiono	RCA Red Seal Records	74321 276052	—
1995	Charles Mackerras	BBC Symphony Orchestra	Sheila Armstrong	BBC Radio Classics	BBCRD 9101	Live recording from 1977
1996	Sir Colin Davis	Bavarian Radio Symphony Orchestra	Angela Maria Blasi	RCA Victor Red Seal	09026 62521 2	—
1996	Emil Tabakov	Sofia Philharmonic Orchestra	Lyudmila Hadzhieva	Capriccio	C49051	—
1997	Simon Rattle	City of Birmingham Symphony Orchestra	Amanda Roocroft	Warner Classics	9029 58691-7	—
1999	Daniele Gatti	Royal Philharmonic Orchestra	Ruth Ziesak	RCA Victor Red Seal	75605 51345 2	—
1999	Bernard Haitink	Concertgebouw Orchestra	Maria Ewing	Philips	464 321-2	Live recording from Kerstmatinee (Christmas Matinee) of 25 December 1982
1999	Yoel Levi	Atlanta Symphony Orchestra	Frederica von Stade	Telarc	CD 80499	—
1999	Georg Solti	New York Philharmonic	Irmgard Seefried	New York Philharmonic Special Editions	NYP 9801-NYP 9812	Live performance from 13 January 1962
2000	Pierre Boulez	The Cleveland Orchestra	Juliane Banse	Deutsche Grammophon	463 257-2	—
2000	Riccardo Chailly	Concertgebouw Orchestra	Barbara Bonney	Decca	466 720-2	—
2001	Benjamin Zander	Philharmonia Orchestra	Camilla Tilling	Telarc	209947	—
2002	Leif Segerstam	Danish National Radio Symphony Orchestra	Eva Johansson	Chandos	CHAN9386	—
2002	Andrew Litton	Dallas Symphony Orchestra	Heidi Grant Murphy	Delos	DE-3261	—
2003	Michael Tilson Thomas	San Francisco Symphony	Laura Claycomb	SFS Media	SFS 0004	—
2003	Yannick Nézet-Séguin	Orchestre Métropolitain	Karina Gauvin	ATMA Classique	ACD22306	—
2005	Claudio Abbado	Berlin Philharmonic	Renée Fleming	Deutsche Grammophon	289 477 557 4	—
2005	Otto Klemperer	Vienna Philharmonic	Teresa Stich-Randall	Testament	SBT1397	live performance of 21 June 1955
2005	Roger Norrington	Stuttgart Radio Symphony Orchestra	Anu Komsi	SWR Music	SWR 19524CD	—
2005	Daniel Harding	Mahler Chamber Orchestra	Dorothea Röschmann	Erato	5456652	—
2006	Hartmut Haenchen	Netherlands Philharmonic Orchestra	Alexandra Coku	Brilliant Classics	93277	—
2007	Bernard Haitink	Royal Concertgebouw Orchestra	Christine Schäfer	RCO Live	RCO 07003	Live performance from 7 November 2006, the 50th anniversary of Haitink's 1956 debut with the Concertgebouw Orchestra
2007	Markus Stenz	Melbourne Symphony Orchestra	Yvonne Kenny	ABC Classics	ABC4766339	—
2008	David Zinman	Tonhalle-Orchester Zürich	Luba Orgonášová	RCA Red Seal	G0100013329367	
2008	Iván Fischer	Budapest Festival Orchestra	Miah Persson	Channel Classics Records	CCS SA 26109	—
2008	Giuseppe Sinopoli	Staatskapelle Dresden	Juliane Banse	Profil Edition Günter Hänssler	PH07047	
2008	Hans Vonk	St. Louis Symphony Orchestra	Esther Heideman	Pentatone	PTC5186323	
2009	Claudio Abbado	Lucerne Festival Orchestra	Magdalena Kožená	EuroArts	205 7988	—
2010	Valery Gergiev	London Symphony Orchestra	Laura Claycomb	LSO Live	LSO0662	—
2010	Sir Charles Mackerras	Philharmonia Orchestra	Sarah Fox	Signum	SIGCD219	—
2010	Jonathan Nott	Bamberg Symphony	Mojca Erdmann	Tudor	TUD7151	—
2010	Markus Stenz	Gürzenich Orchestra Cologne	Christiane Oelze	Oehms Classics	OC649	—
2011	Philippe Herreweghe	Orchestre des Champs-Élysées	Rosemary Joshua	PHI	LPH001	—
2012	Riccardo Chailly	Leipzig Gewandhaus Orchestra	Christina Landshamer	Accentus Music	ACC 20257	DVD
2012	Iván Fischer	Royal Concertgebouw Orchestra	Miah Persson	RCO Live	DVD; live performance from April 2010	
2012	Klaus Tennstedt	Boston Symphony Orchestra	Phyllis Bryn-Julson	ica classics	ICAD5072	DVD, live performance of 15 January 1977
2013	Rudolf Kempe	BBC Symphony Orchestra	Joan Alexander	ica classics	ICAC5117	May 1957 studio recording at BBC Maida Vale Studios
2014	Antonello Manacorda	Het Gelders Orkest	Lisa Larsson	Challenge Classics	CC72659	-
2015	Marc Albrecht	Netherlands Philharmonic Orchestra	Elizabeth Watts	Pentatone	PTC5186487	-
2015	Mariss Jansons	Royal Concertgebouw Orchestra	Dorothea Röschmann	RCO Live	RCO 015004	-
2015	Valery Gergiev	World Orchestra for Peace	Camila Tilling	C Major	731304	DVD, live performance of 5 August 2010, Prom 26, Royal Albert Hall
2015	Paavo Järvi	Frankfurt Radio Symphony	Genia Kühmeier	C Major	719204	DVD
2016	Ádám Fischer	Düsseldorf Symphony Orchestra	Hanna-Elisabeth Müller	AVI Music	AVI 8553378	—
2017	Valery Gergiev	Munich Philharmonic	Genia Kühmeier	Münchner Philharmoniker	9305211300	—
2018	Daniele Gatti	Royal Concertgebouw Orchestra	Julia Kleiter	RCO Live	RCO18004	—
2018	Gustavo Gimeno	Luxembourg Philharmonic Orchestra	Miah Persson	Pentatone	PTC5186651	—
2019	Vladimir Jurowski	London Philharmonic Orchestra	Sofia Fomina	LPO	LPO 0113	—
2019	Bernard Haitink	Bavarian Radio Symphony Orchestra	Juliane Banse	BR Klassik	900174	Live performance from November 2005
2020	Osmo Vänskä	Minnesota Orchestra	Carolyn Sampson	BIS	BIS2356	-
2020	Leif Segerstam	Turku Philharmonic Orchestra	Hanna-Elisabeth Müller	Alba	ABCD454	—
2020	Hans Rosbaud	SWR Sinfonieorchester Baden-Baden	Eva-Maria Rogner	SWR Music	SWR19099CD	Performance of 14 May 1959
2021	Jakub Hrůša	Bamberg Symphony	Anna Lucia Richter	Accentus Music	ACC30532	-
2022	Semyon Bychkov	Czech Philharmonic Orchestra	Chen Reiss	Pentatone	PTC5186972	-
2022	Gabriel Feltz	Stuttgart Philharmonic	Jeanette Wernecke	Dreyer Gaido	DGCD21140	-
2022	Mariss Jansons	Bavarian Radio Symphony Orchestra	Miah Persson	BR Klassik	900719	Live recording from December 2010
2022	François-Xavier Roth	Les Siècles	Sabine Devieilhe	harmonia mundi	HMM905357	-
2023	Otto Klemperer	Vienna Philharmonic	Hilde Gueden	Musicas/ORF	699029	Live recording from 24 August 1947, Salzburg
2023	Simon Gaudenz	Jenaer Philharmonie	Lina Johnson	Odradek Records	ODRCD440	-
2023	Walter Goehr	London Symphony Orchestra	Teresa Stich-Randall	SOMM Recordings	ARIADNE 5022-2	BBC studio recording from 9 February 1960
2024	Yannick Nézet-Séguin	Berlin Philharmonic	Christiane Karg	Berliner Philharmoniker	BPHR200364	Live recording from March 2014, Philharmonie Berlin
2024	Norichika Iimori	Württembergische Philharmonie Reutlingen	Alison Browner	ebs	EBS6130	-

=== Chamber ensemble versions ===
Unless otherwise indicated, the recordings listed below of the chamber orchestra version of the work are of the Erwin Stein arrangement from 1921.

- Howard Griffiths, Northern Sinfonia, Daniel Hellmann (boy soprano from Zürich Boys Choir) (Novalis 150-156-2, 1999)
- Linos Ensemble, Alison Browner (Capriccio C10863, 2001; no conductor identified)
- John Harding, Sydney Soloists, Clare Gormley (ABC Classics ABC4618272, 2004)
- Douglas Boyd, Manchester Camerata, Kate Royal (Avie AV2069, 2005)
- Thomas Christian Ensemble, Christiane Oelze (MDG MDG6031320, 2006; no conductor identified)
- Kenneth Slowik, Smithsonian Chamber Players and Santa Fe Pro Musica, Christine Brandes (Dorian DOR-90315, 2007)
- Oxalys, Laure Delcampe (Fuga Libera FUG548, 2009; no conductor identified)
- David Curtis, Orchestra of the Swan, Heather Shipp (Somm SOMMCD245, 2011)
- Trevor Pinnock, Royal Academy of Music Ensemble, Sonia Grane (Linn CKD438, 2013)
- Festival Ensemble Spannungen, Christian Tetzlaff, Benjamin Beilman, Tanja Tetzlaff, Volker Jacobsen; Christiane Oelze (Avi Music AVI8553334, 2015; no conductor identified)
- Graziella Contratto, MythenEnsemble, Rachel Harnisch (Claves CD1709, 2017)
- Henk Guittart, Gruppo Montebello, Lies Vandewege (Etcetera KTC1620, 2018)
- Dario Garegnani, Ensemble "Giulio Rusconi", Beatrice Binda (Da Vinci Classics, C00618, 2022)
- Rolf Verbeek, Camerata RCO, Barbara Hannigan (Alpha ALPHA872, 2022)
- Alejandro Muñoz, Camerata Gala, Raquel Lojendio (arrangement by Carlos Domínguez-Nieto) (IBS Classical, IBS142022, 2023)
