= Enrique Mazzola =

Spanish-born Italian conductor

- Born: Barcelona, Spain
- Citizenship: Italy, France
- Education: Giuseppe Verdi Milan Conservatory
- Occupations: Conductor, Music Director
- Agent: Askonas Holt
- Honours: Chevalier de l'ordre des Arts et des Lettres (2018); Grifo Poliziano (2020)
- Website: enriquemazzola.com

Enrique Mazzola is a Spanish-born Italian conductor. He studied at the Giuseppe Verdi Milan Conservatory.

Known for his work in bel canto opera and French repertoire, Mazzola performs internationally as both an operatic and symphonic conductor.

- Between 1999 and 2003, he was the artistic and music director of the Cantiere Internazionale d'Arte in Montepulciano
- He served as the artistic and music director of the Orchestre national d'Île-de-France from the 2012/13 to 2018/19 season
- He was appointed principal guest conductor at Deutsche Oper Berlin starting in the 2018/19 season
- As of July 1, 2021, Mazzola is music director of Lyric Opera of Chicago
- In 2022, he was appointed conductor in residence at Bregenz Festival

== Distinctions ==
- October 2018: Mazzola was made a Chevalier de l'ordre des Arts et des Lettres.
- August 2020: Mazzola was awarded the Grifo Poliziano.

== Selected discography ==
- Beethoven: Piano Concerto Nr. 1 & Symphony Nr. 5. Cédric Tiberghien (pianist), Enrique Mazzola (conductor). Orchestre national d'Île-de-France. Label: NoMadMusic
- Bellini / Donizetti / Rossini / Meyerbeer: Opera Ouvertures. Enrique Mazzola (conductor). Orchestre national d'Île-de-France. Label: NoMadMusic
- Donizetti: Don Pasquale. Alessandro Corbelli (Don Pasquale), Danielle de Niese (Norina), Nikolay Borchev (Malatesta), Alek Shrader (Ernesto), Mariame Clément (director), Enrique Mazzola (conductor). Glyndebourne Festival Opera, London Philharmonic Orchestra
- Donizetti: Il Duca D'Alba. Inva Mula, Arturo Chacon Cruz, Franck Ferrari, Francesco Ellero d'Artegna, Maruo Corna, Enrique Mazzola (conductor). Orchestre National de Montpellier Languedoc-Roussillon
- Donizetti: Poliuto. Mariame Clément (director), Enrique Mazzola (conductor). Glyndebourne Festival Opera, London Philharmonic Orchestra
- De Falla: El amor brujo, El sombrero de tres picos, Fanfare pour une fête. Esperanza Fernández (cantaora), Enrique Mazzola (conductor), Orchestre national d'Île-de-France. Label: NoMadMusic
- Liszt: Klavierkonzerte Nr. 1 & 2. Liebrecht Vanbeckevoort (pianist), Enrique Mazzola (conductor). Brussels Philharmonic Orchestra
- Milhaud: La Bien-Aimée / Stravinsky: The Firebird. Rex Lawson (pianist), Enrique Mazzola (conductor). Orchestre national d'Île-de-France. Label: NoMadMusic
- Meyerbeer: Dinorah. Patrizia Ciofi, Étienne Dupuis, Philippe Talbot, Enrique Mazzola (conductor). Chorus and Orchestra of Deutsche Oper Berlin
- Pizzetti: Fedra. Hasmik Papian, Gustavo Porta, Chang Han Lim, Christine Knorren, Enrique Mazzola (conductor). Orchestre National de Montpellier Languedoc-Roussillon
- Rossini: Il Barbiere di Siviglia. Danielle De Niese (Rosina), Björn Bürger (Figaro), Tailor-Stayton, Enrique Mazzola (conductor). Glyndebourne Festival Opera, London Philharmonic Orchestra. Label: Opus Arte (Blu-ray Disc)
- Rossini: Mosè in Egitto. Enrique Mazzola (conductor). Bregenzer Festpiele, Wiener Symphoniker. Label: Unitel
- Verdi: Falstaff. Festival d’Aix-en-Provence, Orchestre de Paris. Label: ArtHaus Musik.
- Ermanno Wolf-Ferrari: La vedova scaltra. Anne-Lise Sollied, Henriette Bonde-Hansen, Francesco Piccoli, Enrique Mazzola (conductor). Orchestre National de Montpellier Languedoc-Roussillon
- "Arabesque": Olga Peretyatko, Enrique Mazzola (conductor). NDR Sinfonieorchester. Label: Sony
