= Otto Mahler =

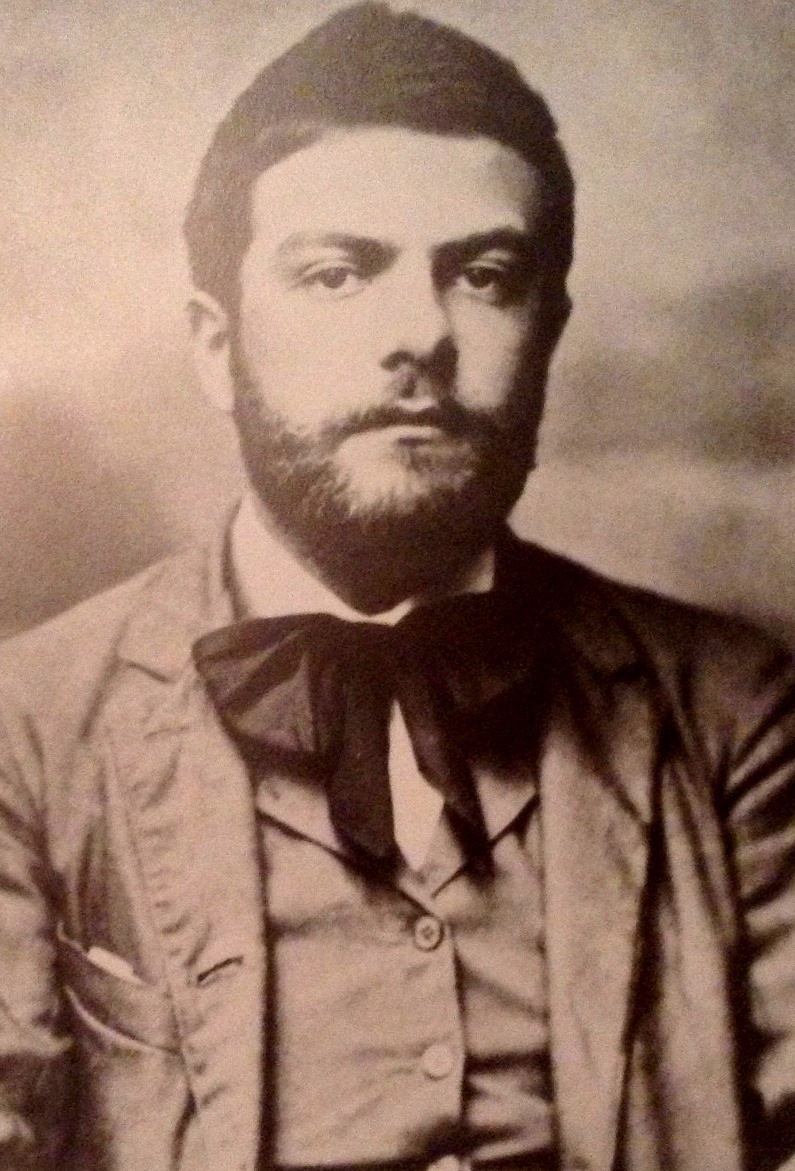

Background information
- Born: 18 June 1873; Jihlava, Austria-Hungary, now Czech Republic
- Died: 6 February 1895 (aged 21) Vienna, Austria-Hungary, now Republic of Austria

Otto Mahler (18 June 1873 – 6 February 1895) was a Bohemian-Austrian musician and composer who died by suicide at the age of 21. Otto was the younger brother of Gustav Mahler, a fellow musician.

Otto was orphaned in 1889 with the death of both his parents, and Gustav became financially responsible for him. By that time, Otto had already begun attending the Vienna Conservatory. Though he was initially considered a talented student, his academic performance was increasingly poor. In April 1892, Otto left the Conservatory without a diploma. He was able to secure work in minor musical posts, but he tended to drift from job to job. On 6 February 1895, Otto shot himself with a revolver while in the house of his and Mahler's friend Nina Hoffmann-Matscheko; a lock of his mother's hair was found in his pocket. According to Gustav's widow Alma, Otto's suicide note stated that life no longer pleased him, so he 'handed back his ticket'.

Otto's known work as a composer included two completed symphonies, an incomplete third symphony, and some lieder with orchestra and piano. His music remains unpublished and is apparently uncatalogued. No recent performances are known; and some of his music may have been lost. His personal property at the time of his death included an incomplete manuscript of Anton Bruckner's Third Symphony. It was inherited by his family, and was transported over the Pyrenees in 1940 by Otto's sister-in-law Alma during her escape from Vichy France.

== Family and early life ==
The twelfth child of Bernard and Marie Mahler, Otto was born in Jihlava and resembled his elder brother Gustav Mahler in displaying a special talent for music at an early age.

== Education ==
Gustav Mahler was already Director of the Royal Opera in Budapest when Otto Mahler entered the Vienna Conservatory in 1888 at the age of 15. Natalie Bauer-Lechner's memoirs describe Otto as having been "liberated from his father's business" by Gustav—who became head of the family, and financially responsible for Otto, upon the deaths of Bernard and Marie in 1889, as well as their sisters Emma and Justine.

Commentary on Otto's life tends to assert that he was a talented student. He appears to have been less diligent than his brother had been, however. After a few successful terms studying harmony and counterpoint with Anton Bruckner and piano with Ernst Ludwig, his marks declined, and the annual report for his first year shows that for some reason he took no final examination in composition. From that point on his academic performance was increasingly poor, and in April 1892, Otto Mahler left the Conservatory without a diploma.

== Career ==
With the help of his brother, Otto was able to find minor musical posts in provincial towns. He seldom stayed long in any place, however. In the autumn of 1893, he took on a position as choirmaster and second conductor of the Leipzig Opera. After moving to a position in Bremen, he returned to Vienna.

== Suicide ==
It was in Vienna on 6 February 1895, that Otto shot himself with a revolver while in the house of his and Mahler's friend Nina Hoffmann-Matscheko; a lock of his mother's hair was found in his pocket. His motivation remains unknown, though the 'Illustrierte Wiener Extrablatt' speculated about a 'matter of the heart'. According to Gustav's widow Alma, Otto's suicide-note stated that life no longer pleased him, so he 'handed back his ticket'.

== Legacy ==
Otto Mahler's music remains unpublished and is apparently uncatalogued. No recent performances are known; indeed, the very survival of the scores is currently uncertain.

At the time of his death, Otto was in possession of an autograph of the first three movements of Anton Bruckner's Third Symphony; this, along with certain of his other effects, passed into the hands of his brother Gustav (apparently in a locked trunk that Gustav never opened), and thence to the collection of his widow Alma. The bulky Bruckner manuscript was one of the very few possessions carried in her backpack during her daring 1940 escape over the Pyrenees with her third husband, writer Franz Werfel, avoiding Vichy France border patrols.

== Works ==
According to Bruno Walter, Otto Mahler left two symphonies, parts of which had been played and "ridiculed" by the public, and an almost-complete Third Symphony, in addition to some lieder with orchestra and piano.

== Quotations ==
"I also had a brother who was like me a musician and a composer. A man of great talent, far more gifted than I. He died very young ... alas ... alas! He killed himself in the prime of life". [Gustav Mahler in conversation with J. B. Foerster]
