= Marie Soldat-Roeger =

Austrian musician (1863–1955)

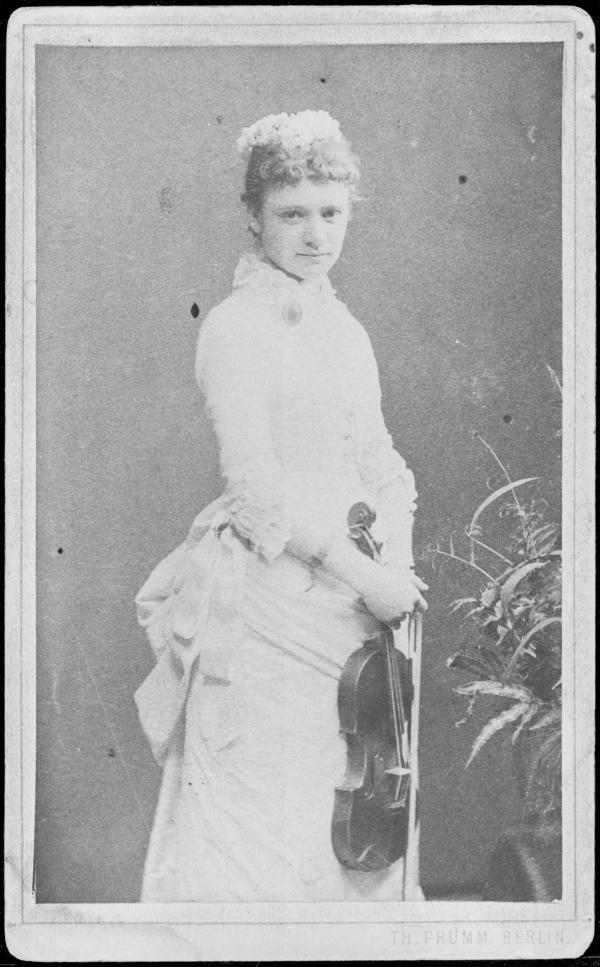

Marie Soldat-Roeger (born in Graz (Styria), March 25, 1863, died in Graz (Styria), September 30, 1955) was a violin virtuoso active in orchestral and chamber music in the Vienna of the late 19th and early 20th centuries. A pupil of violin master Joseph Joachim, she was born 'Marie Soldat', but in 1889 married a lawyer named Roeger.

While studying with Joachim at the Berlin Hochschule für Musik, she won the Mendelssohn Prize in 1880.

Marie Soldat-Roeger became friends with Marie Baumayer, an Austrian pianist, Baumayer was friends with Clara Wittingstein (part of the important Wittgenstein family) and Johannes Brahms. The latter introduced her to Joseph Joachim, who trained her in violin. For many years, she was the only woman to play Brahms's Violin Concerto.

In the late 1880s and early 1890s, she formed an all-female string quartet, in which she played first violin. Agnes Tschetschulin played second violin, Gabriele Roy played viola and Lucy Herbert Campbell played cello. The group toured and was managed by the Herman Wolff Agency, which also managed the Berlin Philharmonic. The group was billed as the world's first all-female professional string quartet.

In 1896, she founded the celebrated, all-female Soldat-Roeger Quartet, whose viola-player was Natalie Bauer-Lechner, Elsa Edle von Plank as second violinist (replacing Ella Finger-Bailetti in 1898), and Leontine Gärtner as cellist (replacing Lucy Herbert Campbell in 1903). This quartet would perform at Soirées musicales presenting modern music.
