= Gustav Mahler =

Composer and conductor (1860–1911)

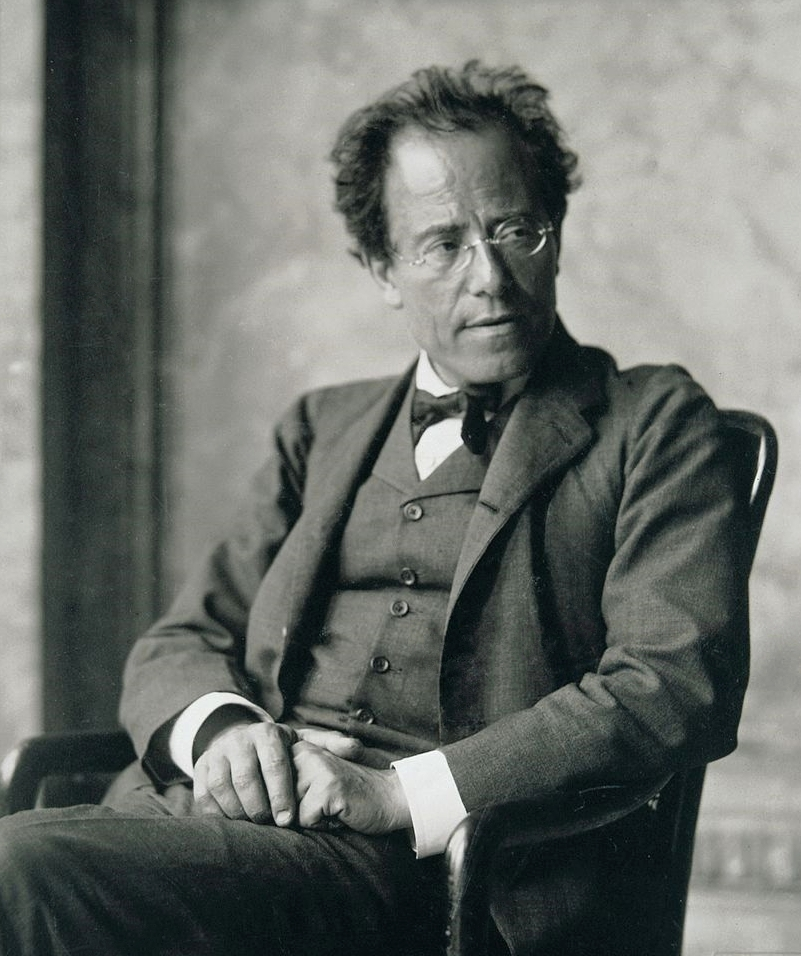
Gustav Mahler, photographed in 1907 by Moritz Nähr at the end of his period as director of the Vienna Hofoper

Gustav Mahler (German: [ˈɡʊstaf ˈmaːlɐ]; 7 July 1860 – 18 May 1911) was an Austro-Bohemian Romantic composer, and one of the leading conductors of his generation. As a composer he acted as a bridge between the 19th-century tradition and the modernism of the early 20th century. While in his lifetime his status as a conductor was established beyond question, his own music gained wide popularity only after periods of relative neglect, which included a ban on its performance in much of Europe during the Nazi era. After 1945 his compositions were rediscovered by a new generation of listeners; Mahler then became one of the most frequently performed and recorded of all composers, a position he has sustained into the 21st century.

Born in Bohemia in the village of Kaliště to Jewish parents of humble origins, the German-speaking Mahler displayed his musical gifts at an early age. After graduating from the Vienna Conservatory in 1878, he held a succession of conducting posts of rising importance in the opera houses of Europe, culminating in his appointment in 1897 as director of the Vienna Court Opera (Hofoper). During his ten years in Vienna, Mahler—who had converted to Catholicism to secure the post—experienced regular opposition and hostility from the anti-Semitic press. Nevertheless, his innovative productions and insistence on the highest performance standards ensured his reputation as one of the greatest of opera conductors, particularly as an interpreter of the stage works of Wagner, Mozart, and Tchaikovsky. Late in his life he was briefly director of New York's Metropolitan Opera and the New York Philharmonic.

Mahler's œuvre is relatively limited; for much of his life composing was necessarily a part-time activity while he earned his living as a conductor. Aside from early works such as a movement from a piano quartet composed when he was a student in Vienna, Mahler's works are generally designed for large orchestral forces, symphonic choruses and operatic soloists. These works were frequently controversial when first performed, and several were slow to receive critical and popular approval; exceptions included his Second Symphony, and the triumphant premiere of his Eighth Symphony in 1910. Some of Mahler's immediate musical successors included the composers of the Second Viennese School, notably Arnold Schoenberg, Alban Berg and Anton Webern. Dmitri Shostakovich and Benjamin Britten are among later 20th-century composers who admired and were influenced by Mahler. The International Gustav Mahler Society was established in 1955 to honour the composer's life and achievements.

== Early life ==
=== Family background ===
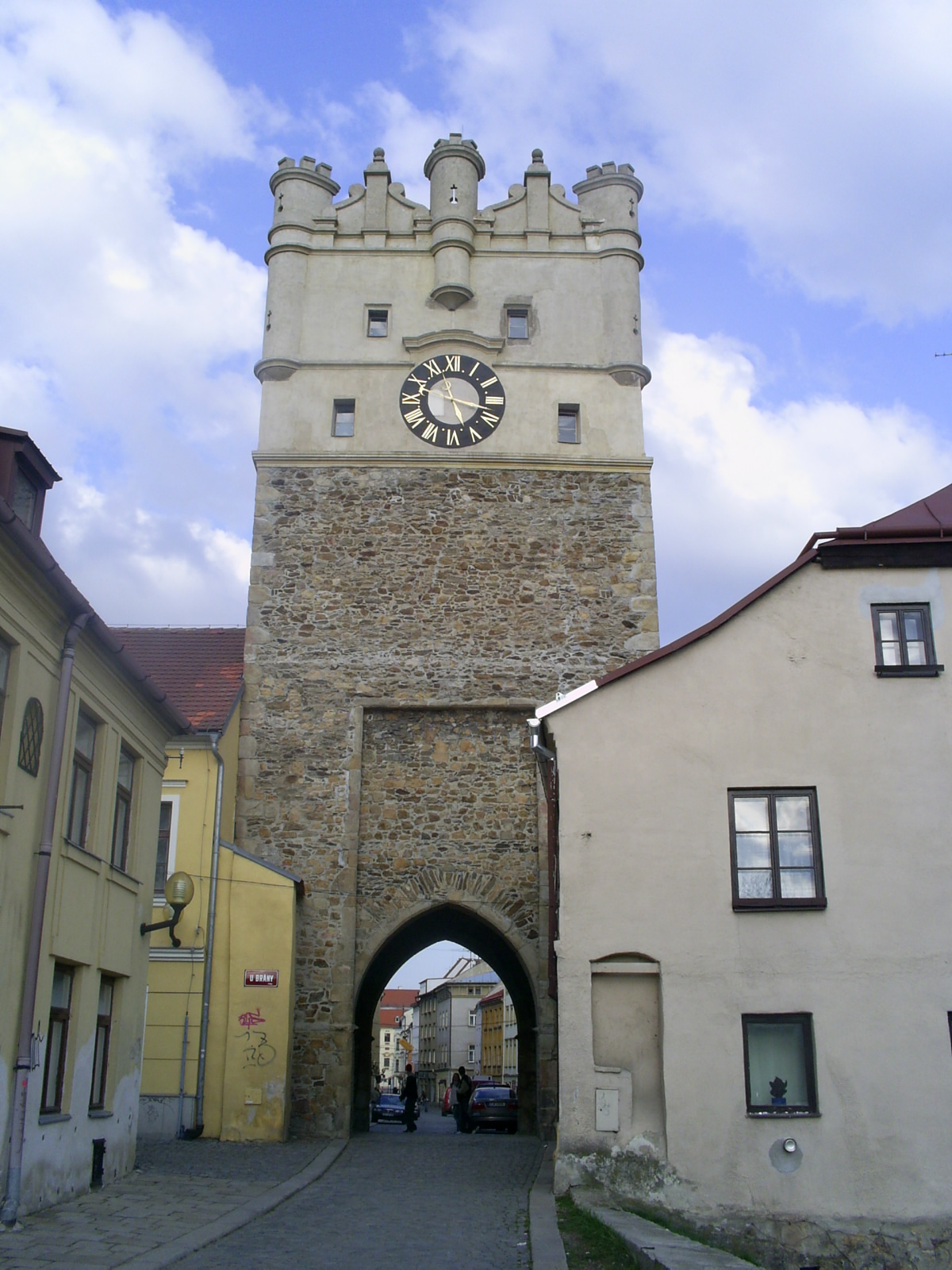
Jihlava, the city where Mahler grew up

The Mahler family came from eastern Bohemia, now in the Czech Republic, and were of humble circumstances—the composer's grandmother had been a street pedlar. Bohemia was then part of the Austrian Empire; the Mahler family belonged to a German-speaking minority among Bohemians, and was also Jewish. From this background the future composer developed early on a permanent sense of exile, "always an intruder, never welcomed". The pedlar's son Bernhard Mahler, the composer's father, elevated himself to the ranks of the petite bourgeoisie by becoming a coachman and later an innkeeper. He bought a modest house in the village of Kaliště (German: Kalischt), and in 1857 married Marie Herrmann, the 19-year-old daughter of a local soap manufacturer. In the following year Marie gave birth to the first of the couple's 14 children, a son named Isidor, who died in infancy. Two years later, on 7 July 1860, their second son, Gustav, was born.

=== Childhood ===
In December 1860, Bernhard Mahler moved with his wife and infant son to the city of Jihlava (German: Iglau), where Bernhard built up a successful distillery and tavern business. The family grew rapidly, but of the 12 children born to the family in the city, only six survived infancy. Jihlava was then a thriving commercial city of 20,000 people, in which Gustav was introduced to music through the street songs of the day, through dance tunes, folk melodies and the trumpet calls and marches of the local military band. All of these elements would later contribute to his mature musical vocabulary.

When he was four years old, Gustav discovered his grandparents' piano and took to it immediately. He developed his performing skills sufficiently to be considered a local Wunderkind and gave his first public performance at the town theatre when he was ten years old. Although Gustav loved making music, his school reports from the Jihlava Gymnasium portrayed him as absent-minded and unreliable in academic work. In 1871, in the hope of improving the boy's results, his father sent him to the New Town Gymnasium in Prague, but Gustav was unhappy there and soon returned to Jihlava. On 13 April 1875 he suffered a bitter personal loss when his younger brother Ernst (b. 18 March 1862) died after a long illness. Mahler sought to express his feelings in music: with the help of a friend, Josef Steiner, he began work on an opera, Herzog Ernst von Schwaben ("Duke Ernest of Swabia"), as a memorial to his lost brother. Neither the music nor the libretto of this work has survived.

=== Student days ===
Bernhard Mahler supported his son's ambitions for a music career, and agreed that the boy should try for a place at the Vienna Conservatory. The young Mahler was auditioned by the renowned pianist Julius Epstein, and accepted for 1875–76. He made good progress in his piano studies with Epstein and won prizes at the end of each of his first two years. For his final year, 1877–78, he concentrated on composition and harmony under Robert Fuchs and Franz Krenn. Few of Mahler's student compositions have survived; most were abandoned when he became dissatisfied with them. He destroyed a symphonic movement prepared for an end-of-term competition, after its scornful rejection by the autocratic director Joseph Hellmesberger on the grounds of copying errors. Mahler may have gained his first conducting experience with the Conservatory's student orchestra, in rehearsals and performances, although it appears that his main role in this orchestra was as a percussionist.

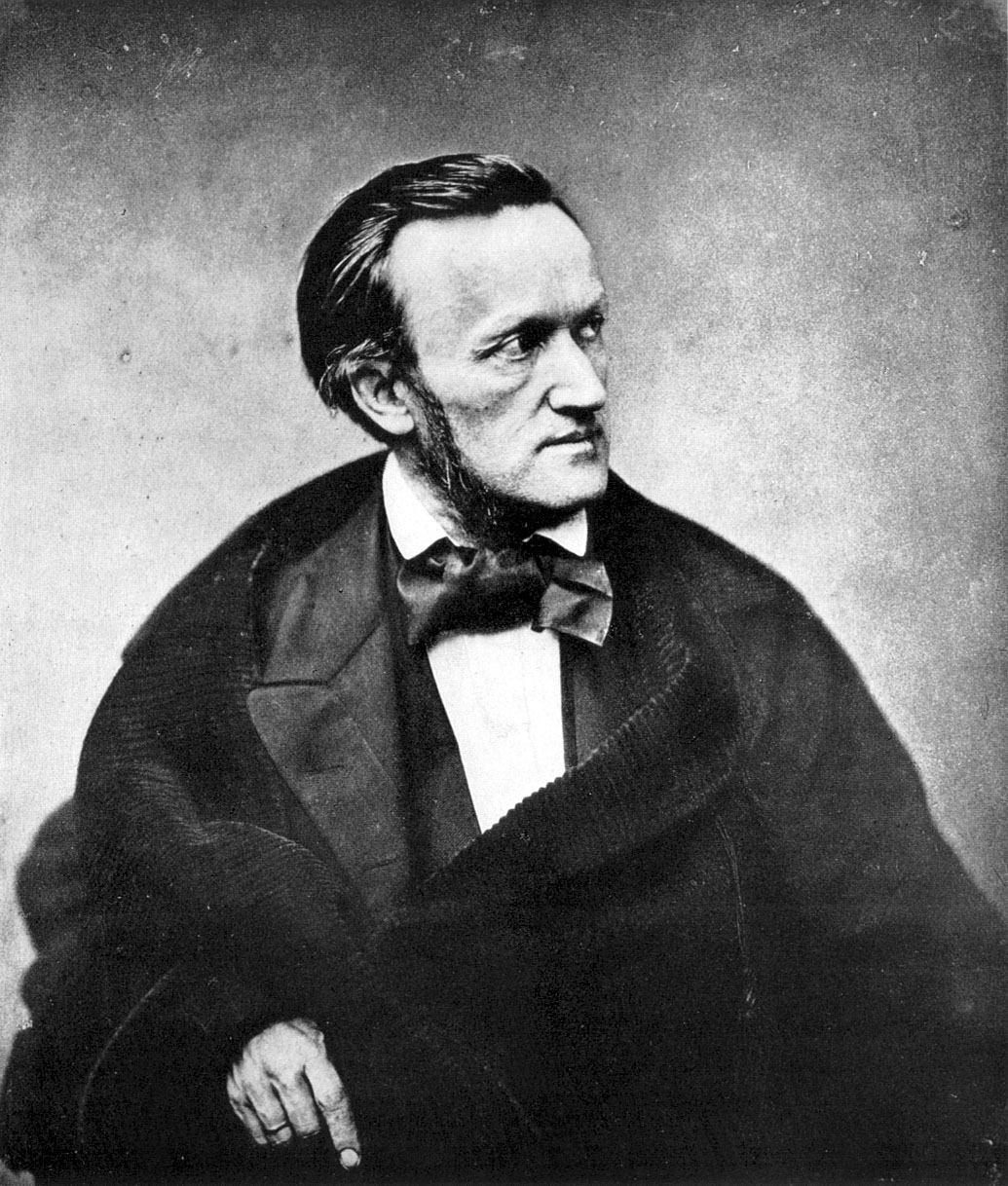
Mahler, as a student, was influenced by Richard Wagner and later became a leading interpreter of Wagner's operas.

Among Mahler's fellow students at the Conservatory was the future song composer Hugo Wolf, with whom he formed a close friendship. Wolf was unable to submit to the strict disciplines of the Conservatory and was expelled. Mahler, while sometimes rebellious, avoided the same fate only by writing a penitent letter to Hellmesberger. He attended occasional lectures by Anton Bruckner and, though never formally his pupil, was influenced by him. On 16 December 1877, he attended the disastrous premiere of Bruckner's Third Symphony, at which the composer was shouted down, and most of the audience walked out. Mahler and other sympathetic students later prepared a piano version of the symphony, which they presented to Bruckner. Along with many music students of his generation, Mahler fell under the spell of Richard Wagner, though his chief interest was the sound of the music rather than the staging. It is not known whether he saw any of Wagner's operas during his student years.

Mahler left the conservatory in 1878 with a diploma but without the silver medal given for outstanding achievement. He then enrolled in the University of Vienna (he had, at his father's insistence, sat and with difficulty passed the Matura, a highly demanding final exam at a Gymnasium, which was a precondition for university studies) and followed courses which reflected his developing interests in literature and philosophy. After leaving the university in 1879, Mahler made some money as a piano teacher, continued to compose, and in 1880 finished a dramatic cantata, Das klagende Lied ("The Song of Lamentation"). This, his first substantial composition, shows traces of Wagnerian and Brucknerian influences, yet includes many musical elements which musicologist Deryck Cooke describes as "pure Mahler". Its first performance was delayed until 1901, when it was presented in a revised, shortened form.

Mahler developed interests in German philosophy, and was introduced by his friend Siegfried Lipiner to the works of Arthur Schopenhauer, Friedrich Nietzsche, Gustav Fechner and Hermann Lotze. These thinkers continued to influence Mahler and his music long after his student days were over. Mahler's biographer Jonathan Carr says that the composer's head was "not only full of the sound of Bohemian bands, trumpet calls and marches, Bruckner chorales and Schubert sonatas. It was also throbbing with the problems of philosophy and metaphysics he had thrashed out, above all, with Lipiner".

== Early conducting career, 1880–1888 ==
=== First appointments ===
From June to August 1880, Mahler took his first professional conducting job, in a small wooden theatre in the spa town of Bad Hall, south of Linz. The repertory was exclusively operetta; it was, in Carr's words "a dismal little job", which Mahler accepted only after Julius Epstein told him he would soon work his way up. In 1881, he was engaged for six months (September to April) at the Landestheater in Laibach (now Ljubljana, in Slovenia), where the small but resourceful company was prepared to attempt more ambitious works. Here, Mahler conducted his first full-scale opera, Verdi's Il trovatore, one of 10 operas and a number of operettas that he presented during his time in Laibach. After completing this engagement, Mahler returned to Vienna and worked part-time as chorus-master at the Vienna Carltheater.

From the beginning of January 1883, Mahler became conductor at the Royal Municipal Theatre in Olomouc (German: Olmütz) in Moravia. He later wrote: "From the moment I crossed the threshold of the Olmütz theatre I felt like one awaiting the wrath of God." Despite poor relations with the orchestra, Mahler brought nine operas to the theatre, including Bizet's Carmen, and won over the press that had initially been sceptical of him. After a week's trial at the Royal Theatre in the Hessian town of Kassel, Mahler became the theatre's "Musical and Choral Director" from August 1883. The title concealed the reality that Mahler was subordinate to the theatre's Kapellmeister, Wilhelm Treiber, who disliked him (and vice versa) and set out to make his life miserable. Despite the unpleasant atmosphere, Mahler had moments of success at Kassel. He directed a performance of his favourite opera, Carl Maria von Weber's Der Freischütz, and 25 other operas. On 23 June 1884, he conducted his own incidental music to Joseph Victor von Scheffel's play Der Trompeter von Säckingen ("The Trumpeter of Säckingen"), the first professional public performance of a Mahler work. (Note: The music of Der Trompeter von Säkkingen has been mostly lost. A movement entitled "Blumine" was included in the first, five-movement version of Mahler's First Symphony.) An ardent, but ultimately unfulfilled, love affair with soprano Johanna Richter led Mahler to write a series of love poems which became the text of his song cycle Lieder eines fahrenden Gesellen ("Songs of a Wayfarer").

In January 1884, the distinguished conductor Hans von Bülow brought the Meiningen Court Orchestra to Kassel and gave two concerts. Hoping to escape from his job in the theatre, Mahler unsuccessfully sought a post as Bülow's permanent assistant. However, in the following year his efforts to find new employment resulted in a six-year contract with the prestigious Leipzig Opera, to begin in August 1886. Unwilling to remain in Kassel for another year, Mahler resigned on 22 June 1885, and applied for, and through good fortune was offered, a standby appointment as conductor at the Royal Neues Deutsches Theater in Prague by the theatre's newly appointed director, the famous Angelo Neumann.

=== Prague and Leipzig ===
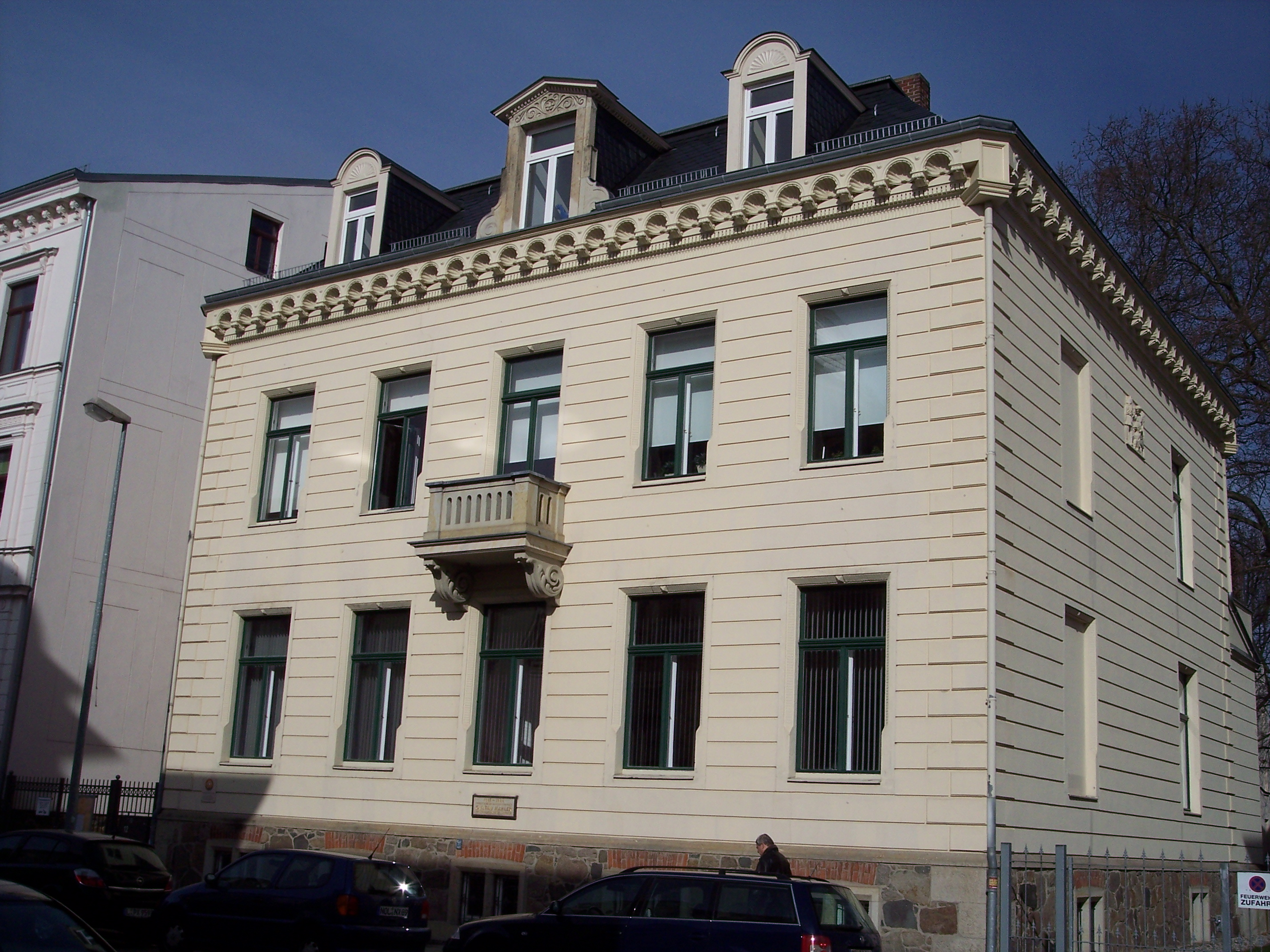
Mahler's home in Leipzig, where he composed his First Symphony

In Prague, the emergence of the Czech National Revival had increased the popularity and importance of the new Czech National Theatre, and had led to a downturn in the Neues Deutsches Theater's fortunes. Mahler's task was to help arrest this decline by offering high-quality productions of German opera. He enjoyed early success presenting works by Mozart and Wagner, composers with whom he would be particularly associated for the rest of his career, but his individualistic and increasingly autocratic conducting style led to friction, and a falling out with his more experienced fellow-conductor, Ludwig Slansky. During his 12 months in Prague he conducted 68 performances of 14 operas (12 titles were new in his repertory), and he also performed Beethoven's Ninth Symphony for the first time in his life. By the end of the season, in July 1886, Mahler left Prague to take up his post at the Neues Stadttheater in Leipzig, where rivalry with his senior colleague Arthur Nikisch began almost at once. This conflict was primarily over how the two should share conducting duties for the theatre's new production of Wagner's Ring cycle. Nikisch's illness, from February to April 1887, meant that Mahler took charge of the whole cycle (except Götterdämmerung), and scored a resounding public success. This did not, however, win him popularity with the orchestra, who resented his dictatorial manner and heavy rehearsal schedules.

In Leipzig, Mahler befriended Captain Carl von Weber (1849–1897), grandson of the composer, and agreed to prepare a performing version of Weber's unfinished opera Die drei Pintos ("The Three Pintos"). Mahler transcribed and orchestrated the existing musical sketches, used parts of other Weber works, and added some composition of his own. The premiere at the Stadttheater, on 20 January 1888, was an important occasion at which several heads of various German opera houses were present. (The Russian composer Tchaikovsky attended the third performance on 29 January.) The work was well-received; its success did much to raise Mahler's public profile, and brought him financial rewards. Mahler's involvement with the Weber family was complicated by Mahler's alleged romantic attachment to Carl von Weber's wife Marion Mathilde (1857–1931) which, though intense on both sides – so it was rumoured by for example English composer Ethel Smyth – ultimately came to nothing. In February and March 1888 Mahler sketched and completed his First Symphony, then in five movements. At around the same time Mahler discovered the German folk-poem collection Des Knaben Wunderhorn ("The Youth's Magic Horn"), which would dominate much of his compositional output for the following 12 years. (Note: Mahler may have been aware of this collection earlier, since he had based the first of the Lieder eines fahrenden Gesellen poems on a Wunderhorn text.)

On 17 May 1888, Mahler suddenly resigned his Leipzig position after a dispute with the Stadttheater's chief stage manager, Albert Goldberg. However, Mahler had secretly been invited by Angelo Neumann in Prague (and accepted the offer) to conduct the premiere there of "his" Die drei Pintos, and later also a production of Der Barbier von Bagdad by Peter Cornelius. This short stay (July to September) ended unhappily, with Mahler's dismissal following his outburst during a rehearsal. However, through the efforts of an old Viennese friend, Guido Adler, and cellist David Popper, Mahler's name went forward as a potential director of the Royal Hungarian Opera in Budapest. He was interviewed, made a good impression, and was offered and accepted (with some reluctance) the post from 1 October 1888.

=== Apprentice composer ===
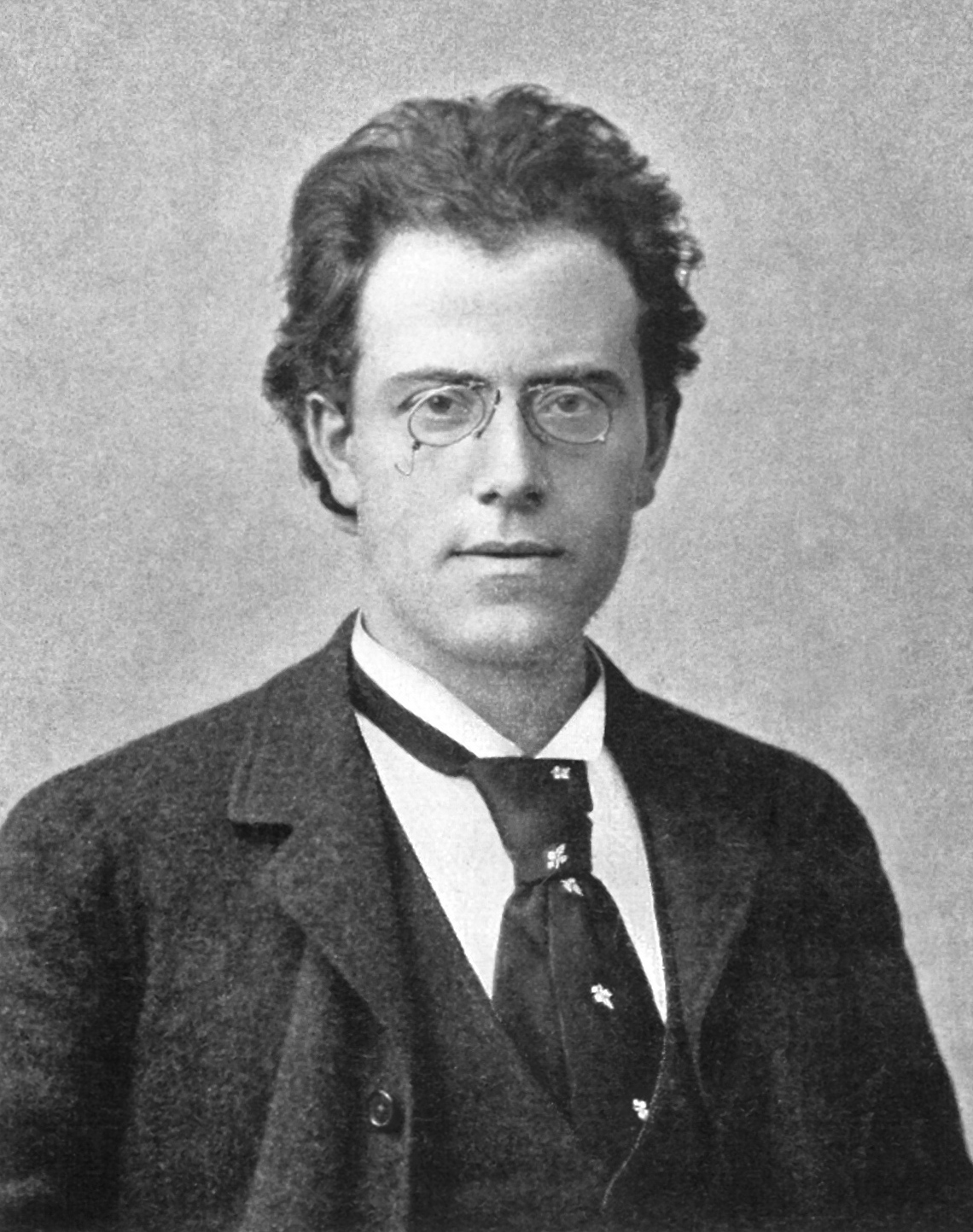
Mahler in 1892

Symphony no. 1, second movement (excerpt)

In the early years of Mahler's conducting career, composing was a spare time activity. Between his Laibach and Olmütz appointments he worked on settings of verses by Richard Leander and Tirso de Molina, later collected as Volume I of Lieder und Gesänge ("Songs and Airs"). Mahler's first orchestral song cycle, Lieder eines fahrenden Gesellen, composed at Kassel, was based on his own verses, although the first poem, "Wenn mein Schatz Hochzeit macht" ("When my love becomes a bride") closely follows the text of a Wunderhorn poem. The melodies for the second and fourth songs of the cycle were incorporated into the First Symphony, which Mahler finished in 1888, at the height of his relationship with Marion von Weber. The intensity of Mahler's feelings is reflected in the music, which originally was written as a five-movement symphonic poem with a descriptive programme. One of these movements, the "Blumine", later discarded, was based on a passage from his earlier work Der Trompeter von Säckingen. After completing the symphony, Mahler composed a 20-minute symphonic poem, Totenfeier "Funeral Rites", which later became the first movement of his Second Symphony.

There has been frequent speculation about lost or destroyed works from Mahler's early years. The Dutch conductor Willem Mengelberg believed that the First Symphony was too mature to be a first symphonic work, and must have had predecessors. In 1938, Mengelberg revealed the existence of the so-called "Dresden archive", a series of manuscripts in the possession of the widowed Marion von Weber. According to the Mahler historian Donald Mitchell, it was highly likely that important Mahler manuscripts of early symphonic works had been held in Dresden; this archive, if it existed, was almost certainly destroyed in the bombing of Dresden in 1945.

== Budapest and Hamburg, 1888–1897 ==
=== Royal Opera, Budapest ===
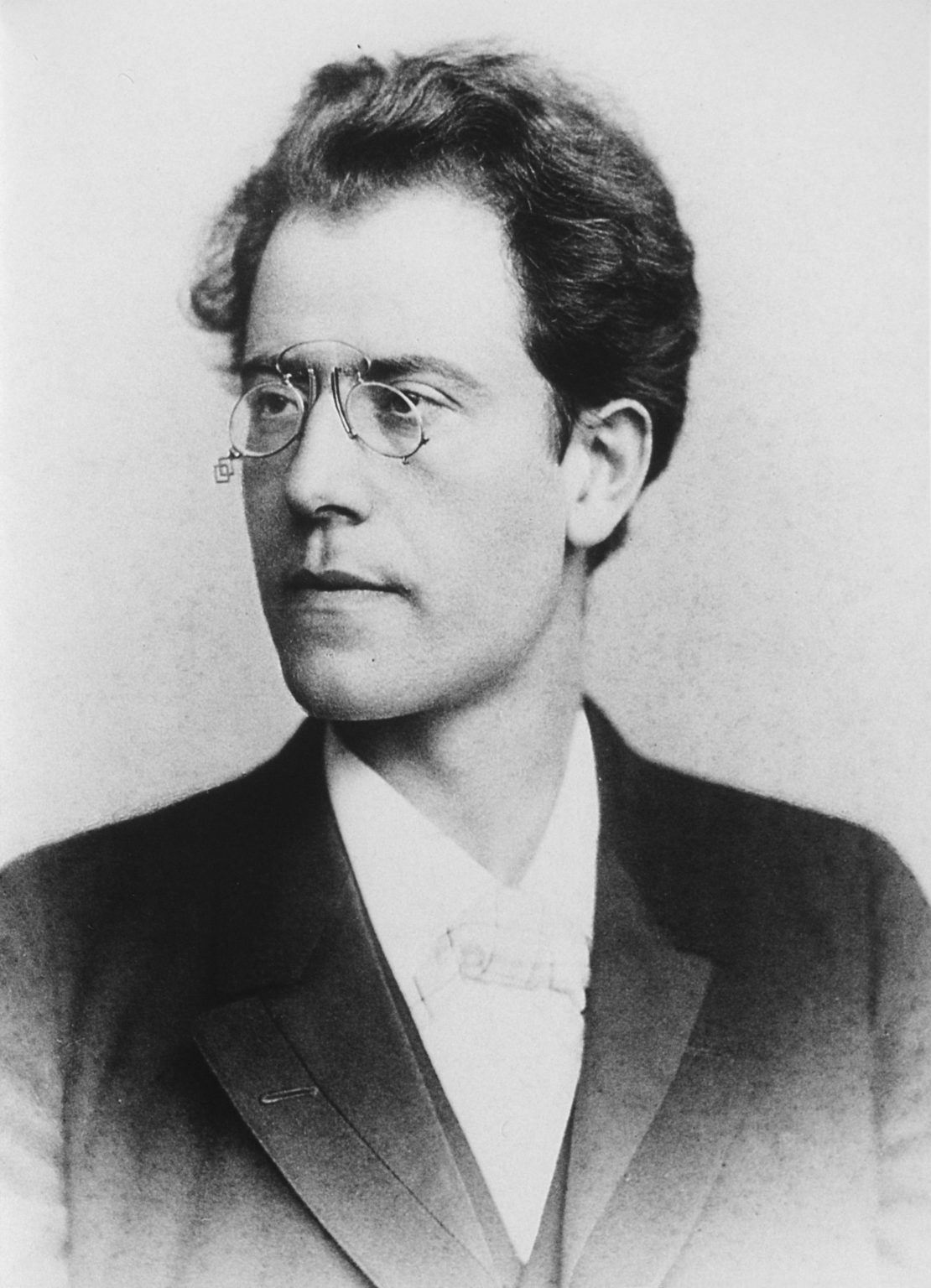
Mahler in 1896

On arriving in Budapest in October 1888, Mahler encountered a cultural conflict between conservative Hungarian nationalists who favoured a policy of Magyarisation, and progressives who wanted to maintain and develop the country's Austro-German cultural traditions. In the opera house a dominant conservative caucus, led by the music director Sándor Erkel, had maintained a limited repertory of historical and folklore opera. By the time that Mahler began his duties, the progressive camp had gained ascendancy following the appointment of the liberal-minded Ferenc von Beniczky as intendant. Aware of the delicate situation, Mahler moved cautiously; he delayed his first appearance on the conductor's stand until January 1889, when he conducted Hungarian-language performances of Wagner's Das Rheingold and Die Walküre to initial public acclaim. However, his early successes faded when plans to stage the remainder of the Ring cycle and other German operas were frustrated by a renascent conservative faction which favoured a more traditional "Hungarian" programme. In search of non-German operas to extend the repertory, Mahler visited in spring 1890 Italy where among the works he discovered was Mascagni's recent sensation Cavalleria rusticana (Budapest premiere on 26 December 1890).

On 18 February 1889, Bernhard Mahler died; this was followed later in the year by the deaths both of Mahler's sister Leopoldine (27 September) and his mother (11 October). From October 1889 Mahler took charge of his four younger brothers and sisters (Alois, Otto, Justine, and Emma). They were installed in a rented flat in Vienna. Mahler himself suffered poor health, with attacks of haemorrhoids and migraine and a recurrent septic throat. Shortly after these family and health setbacks the premiere of the First Symphony, in Budapest on 20 November 1889, was a disappointment. The critic August Beer's lengthy newspaper review indicates that enthusiasm after the early movements degenerated into "audible opposition" after the Finale. Mahler was particularly distressed by the negative comments from his Vienna Conservatory contemporary, Viktor von Herzfeld, who had remarked that Mahler, like many conductors before him, had proved not to be a composer.

In 1891, Hungary's move to the political right was reflected in the opera house when Beniczky on 1 February was replaced as intendant by Count Géza Zichy, a conservative aristocrat determined to assume artistic control over Mahler's head. However, Mahler had foreseen that and had secretly been negotiating with Bernhard Pollini, the director of the Stadttheater Hamburg since summer and autumn of 1890, and a contract was finally signed in secrecy on 15 January 1891. Mahler more or less "forced" himself to be sacked from his Budapest post, and he succeeded on 14 March 1891. By his departure he received a large sum of indemnity. One of his final Budapest triumphs was a performance of Mozart's Don Giovanni (16 September 1890) which won him praise from Brahms, who was present at the performances on 16 December 1890. During his Budapest years Mahler's compositional output had been limited to a few songs from the Wunderhorn song settings that became Volumes II and III of Lieder und Gesänge, and amendments to the First Symphony.

=== Stadttheater Hamburg ===
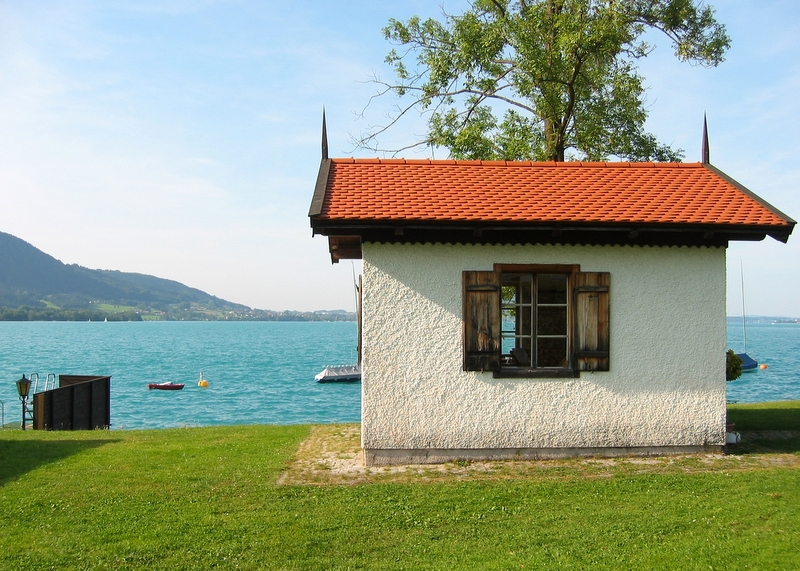
Komponierhäuschen (German for 'composition hut') in Steinbach am Attersee, where Mahler composed in the summer from 1893

Mahler's Hamburg post was as chief conductor, subordinate to the director, Bernhard Pohl (known as Pollini) who retained overall artistic control. Pollini was prepared to give Mahler considerable leeway if the conductor could provide commercial as well as artistic success. This Mahler did in his first season, when he conducted Wagner's Tristan und Isolde for the first time and gave acclaimed performances of the same composer's Tannhäuser and Siegfried. Another triumph was the German premiere of Tchaikovsky's Eugene Onegin, in the presence of the composer, who called Mahler's conducting "astounding", and later asserted in a letter that he believed Mahler was "positively a genius". Mahler's demanding rehearsal schedules led to predictable resentment from the singers and orchestra in whom, according to music writer Peter Franklin, the conductor "inspired hatred and respect in almost equal measure". He found support, however, from Hans von Bülow, who was in Hamburg as director of the city's subscription concerts. Bülow, who had spurned Mahler's approaches in Kassel, had come to admire the younger man's conducting style, and on Bülow's death in 1894 Mahler took over the direction of the concerts.

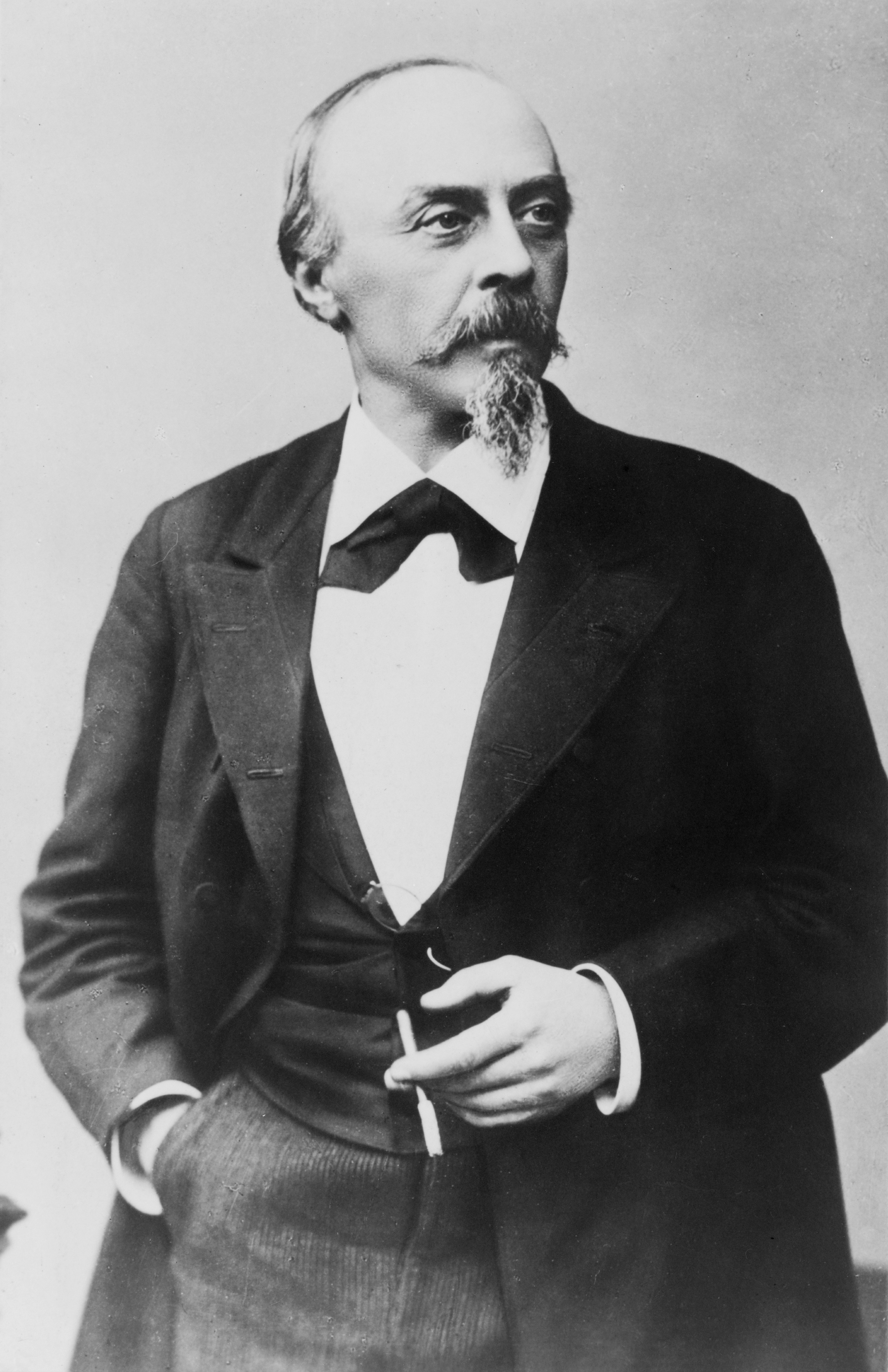
Hans von Bülow, an admirer of Mahler's conducting

In the summer of 1892 Mahler took the Hamburg singers to London to participate in an eight-week season of German opera—his only visit to Britain. His conducting of Tristan enthralled the young composer Ralph Vaughan Williams, who "staggered home in a daze and could not sleep for two nights." However, Mahler refused further such invitations as he was anxious to reserve his summers for composing. In 1893 he acquired a retreat at Steinbach, on the banks of Lake Attersee in Upper Austria, and established a pattern that persisted for the rest of his life; summers would henceforth be dedicated to composition, at Steinbach or its successor retreats. Now firmly under the influence of the Wunderhorn folk-poem collection, Mahler produced a stream of song settings at Steinbach, and composed his Second and Third Symphonies there.

Performances of Mahler works were still comparatively rare (he had not composed very much). On 27 October 1893, at Hamburg's Konzerthaus Ludwig, Mahler conducted a revised version of his First Symphony; still in its original five-movement form, it was presented as a Tondichtung (tone poem) under the descriptive name "Titan". This concert also introduced six recent Wunderhorn settings. Mahler achieved his first relative success as a composer when the Second Symphony was well-received on its premiere in Berlin, under his own baton, on 13 December 1895. Mahler's conducting assistant Bruno Walter, who was present, said that "one may date [Mahler's] rise to fame as a composer from that day." That same year Mahler's private life had been disrupted by the suicide of his younger brother Otto on 6 February.

At the Stadttheater Mahler's repertory consisted of 66 operas of which 36 titles were new to him. During his six years in Hamburg, he conducted 744 performances, including the debuts of Verdi's Falstaff, Humperdinck's Hänsel und Gretel, and works by Smetana. However, he was forced to resign his post with the subscription concerts after poor financial returns and an ill-received interpretation of his re-scored Beethoven's Ninth Symphony. Already at an early age Mahler had made it clear that his ultimate goal was an appointment in Vienna, and from 1895 onward was manoeuvring, with the help of influential friends, to secure the directorship of the Vienna Hofoper. He overcame the bar that existed against the appointment of a Jew to this post by what may have been a pragmatic conversion to Catholicism in February 1897. Despite this event, Mahler has been described as a lifelong agnostic.

== Vienna, 1897–1907 ==
=== Hofoper director ===
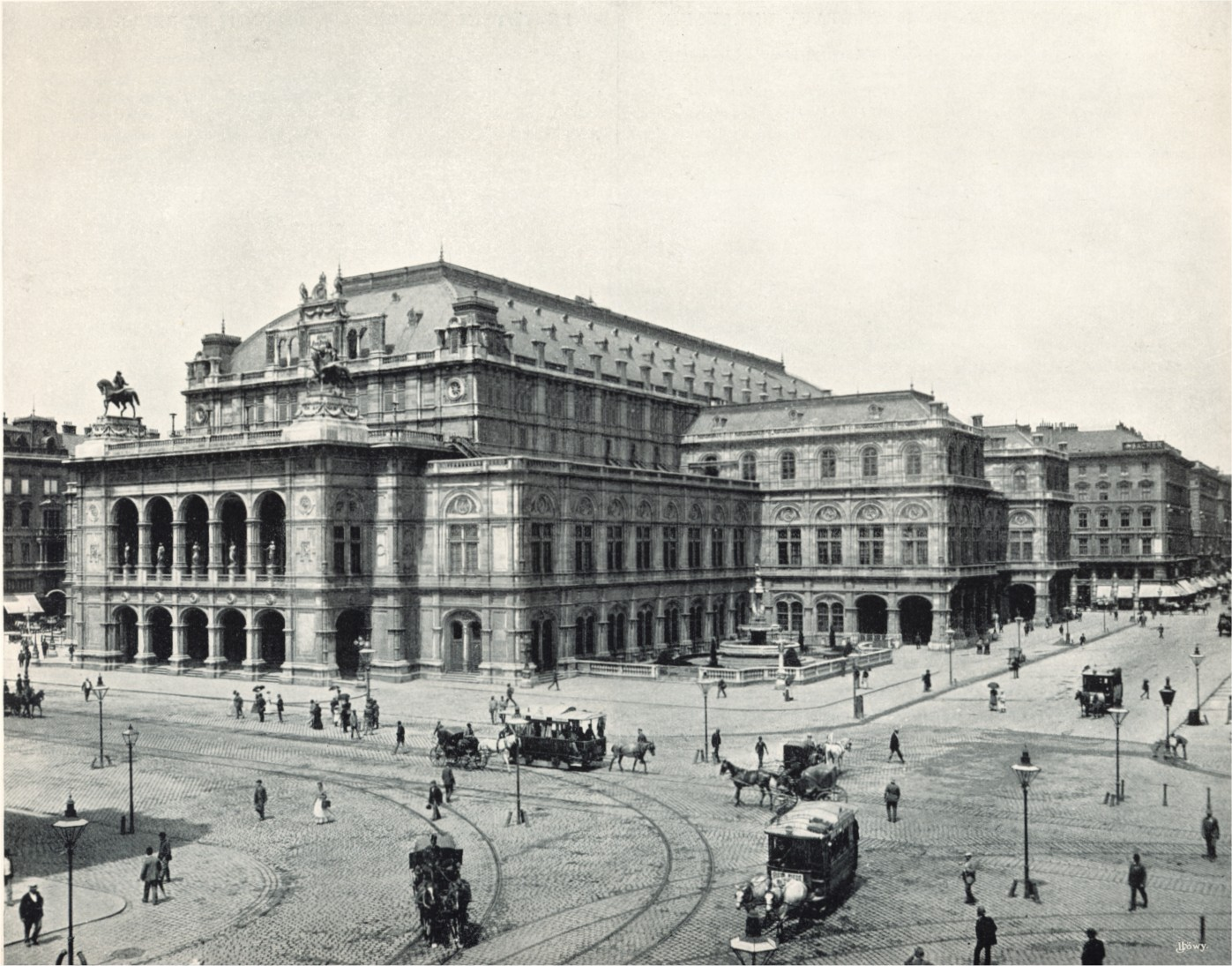
Vienna Hofoper (now Staatsoper), pictured in 1898 during Mahler's conductorship

As he waited for the Emperor's confirmation of his directorship, Mahler shared duties as a resident conductor with Joseph Hellmesberger Jr. (son of the former conservatory director) and Hans Richter, an internationally renowned interpreter of Wagner and the conductor of the original Ring cycle at Bayreuth in 1876. Director Wilhelm Jahn had not consulted Richter about Mahler's appointment; Mahler, sensitive to the situation, wrote Richter a complimentary letter expressing unswerving admiration for the older conductor. Subsequently, the two were rarely in agreement, but kept their divisions private.

Vienna, the imperial Habsburg capital, had recently elected an anti-Semitic conservative mayor, Karl Lueger, who had once proclaimed: "I myself decide who is a Jew and who isn't." In such a volatile political atmosphere Mahler needed an early demonstration of his German cultural credentials. He made his initial mark in May 1897 with much-praised performances of Wagner's Lohengrin and Mozart's Die Zauberflöte. Shortly after the Zauberflöte triumph, Mahler was forced to take sick leave for several weeks, during which he was nursed by his sister Justine and his long-time companion, the viola player Natalie Bauer-Lechner. Mahler returned to Vienna in late July to prepare for Vienna's first uncut version of the Ring cycle. This performance took place on 24–27 August, attracting critical praise and public enthusiasm. Mahler's friend Hugo Wolf told Bauer-Lechner that "for the first time I have heard the Ring as I have always dreamed of hearing it while reading the score".

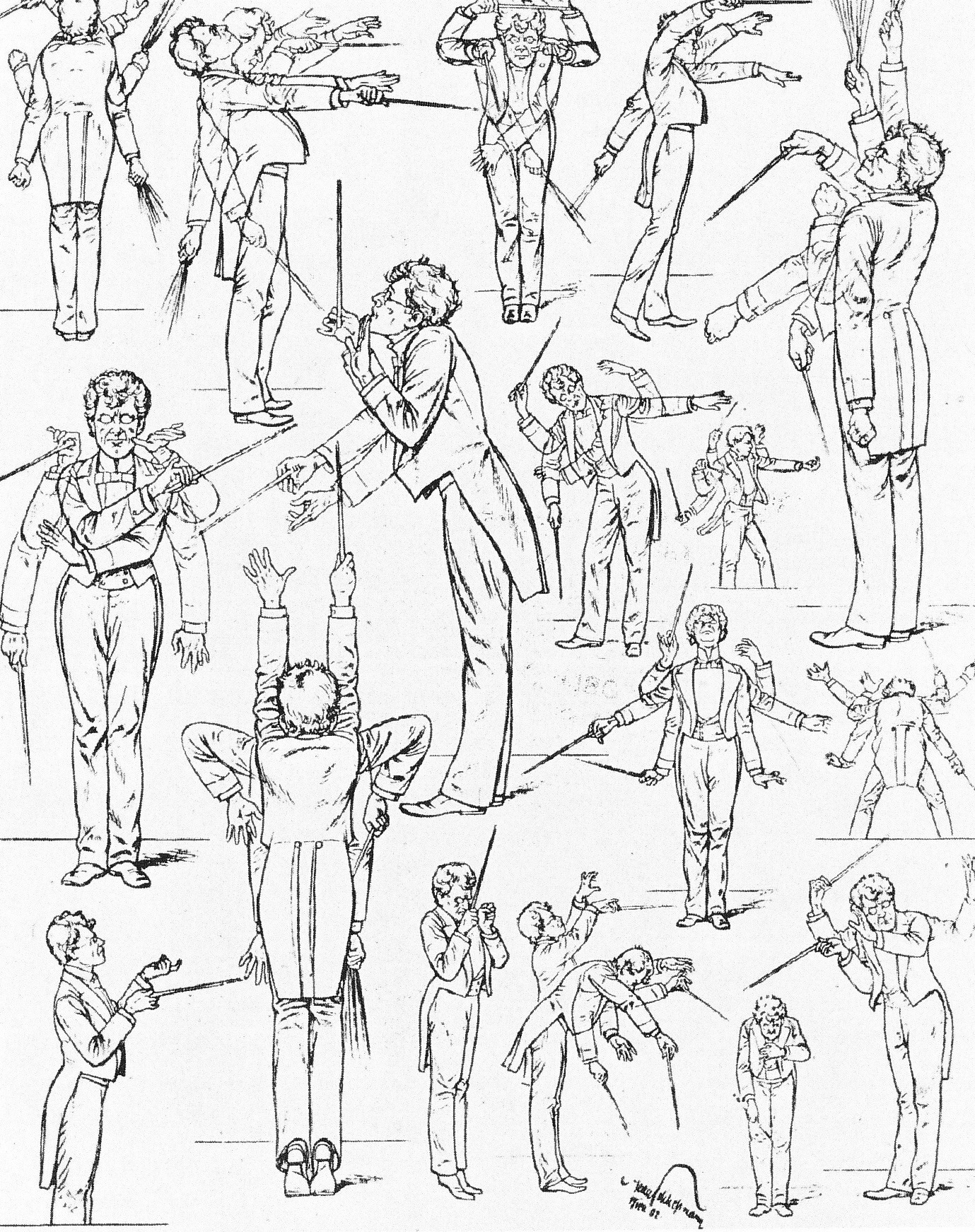
Mahler's conducting style, 1901, caricatured in the humour magazine Fliegende Blätter

On 8 October Mahler was formally appointed to succeed Jahn as the Hofoper's director. (Note: Some sources, e.g., Paul Banks writing in Sadie, p. 509, give the appointment date as 8 September 1897. According to La Grange the decree appointing Mahler to the directorship was dated 8 October and signed by the Lord Chamberlain on behalf of the Emperor on 15 October.) His first production in his new office was Smetana's Czech nationalist opera Dalibor, with a reconstituted finale that left the hero Dalibor alive. This production caused anger among the more extreme Viennese German nationalists, who accused Mahler of "fraternising with the anti-dynastic, inferior Czech nation." The Austrian author Stefan Zweig, in his memoirs The World of Yesterday (1942), described Mahler's appointment as an example of the Viennese public's general distrust of young artists: "Once, when an amazing exception occurred and Gustav Mahler was named director of the Court Opera at thirty-eight years old, a frightened murmur and astonishment ran through Vienna, because someone had entrusted the highest institute of art to 'such a young person' ... This suspicion—that all young people were 'not very reliable'—ran through all circles at that time." Zweig also wrote that "to have seen Gustav Mahler on the street [in Vienna] was an event that one would proudly report to his comrades the next morning as if it were a personal triumph." During Mahler's tenure a total of 33 new operas were introduced to the Hofoper; a further 55 were new or totally revamped productions. However, a proposal to stage Richard Strauss's controversial opera Salome in 1905 was rejected by the Viennese censors.

Early in 1902 Mahler met Alfred Roller, an artist and designer associated with the Vienna Secession movement. A year later, Mahler appointed him chief stage designer to the Hofoper, where Roller's debut was a new production of Tristan und Isolde. (Note: Alma Schindler, Mahler's future wife, claimed to have introduced Mahler to Roller at her stepfather's house in January 1902. However, there is some evidence that Roller had worked on designs for the Hofoper as early as January 1901.) The collaboration between Mahler and Roller created more than 20 celebrated productions of, among other operas, Beethoven's Fidelio, Gluck's Iphigénie en Aulide and Mozart's Le nozze di Figaro. In the Figaro production, Mahler offended some purists by adding and composing a short recitative scene to Act III.

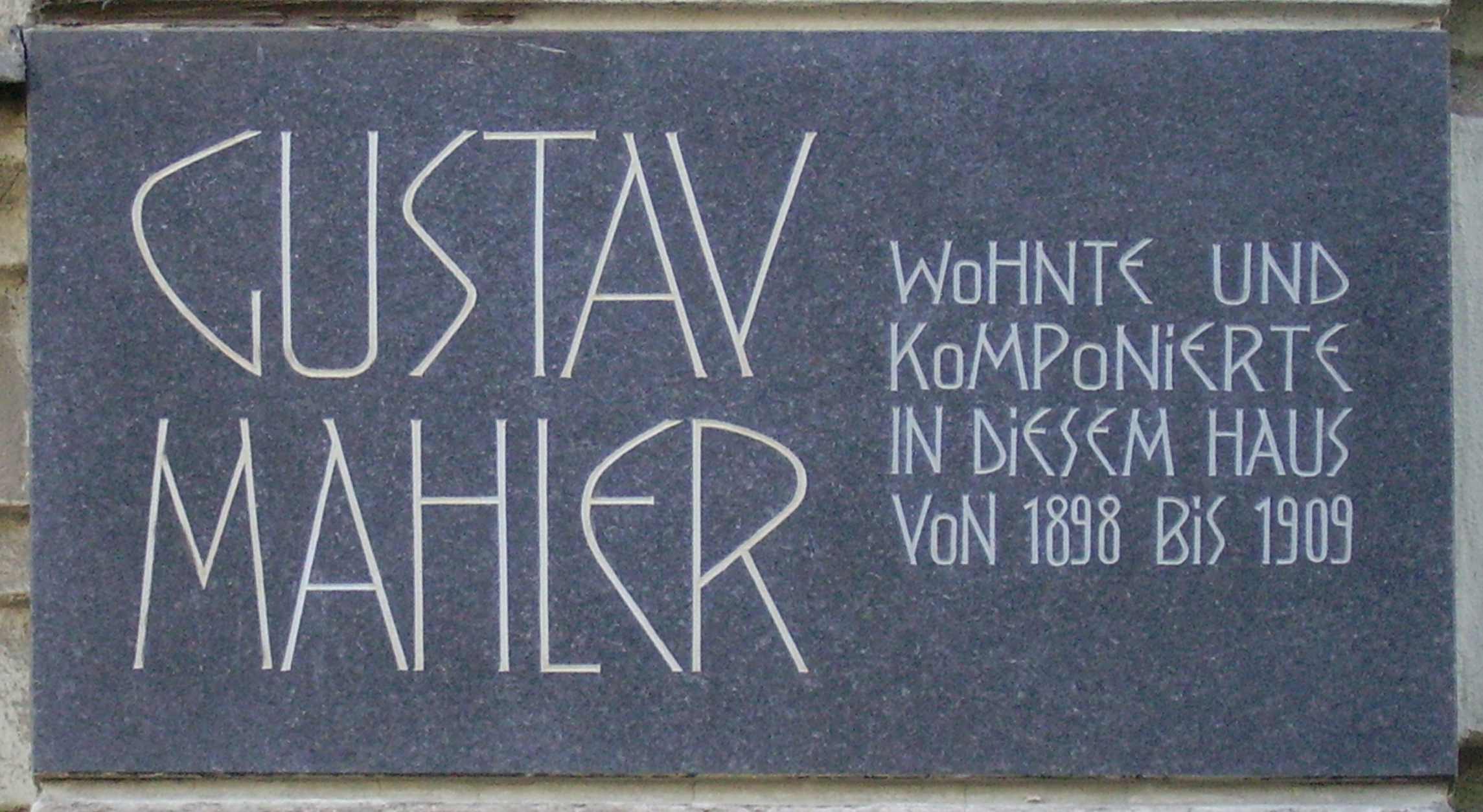
Plaque on Mahler's Vienna apartment, 2 Auenbruggergasse: "Gustav Mahler lived and composed in this house from 1898 to 1909"

In spite of numerous theatrical triumphs, Mahler's Vienna years were rarely smooth; his battles with singers and the house administration continued on and off for the whole of his tenure. While Mahler's methods improved standards, his histrionic and dictatorial conducting style was resented by orchestra members and singers alike. In December 1903 Mahler faced a revolt by stagehands, whose demands for better conditions he rejected in the belief that extremists were manipulating his staff. The anti-Semitic elements in Viennese society, long opposed to Mahler's appointment, continued to attack him relentlessly, and in 1907 instituted a press campaign designed to drive him out. By that time he was at odds with the opera house's administration over the amount of time he was spending on his own music, and was preparing to leave. In May 1907 he began discussions with Heinrich Conried, director of the New York Metropolitan Opera, and on 21 June signed a contract, on very favourable terms, for four seasons' conducting in New York. At the end of the summer he submitted his resignation to the Hofoper, and on 15 October 1907 conducted Fidelio, his 645th and final performance there. During his ten years in Vienna, Mahler had brought new life to the opera house and cleared its debts, but had won few friends—it was said that he treated his musicians in the way a lion tamer treated his animals. His departing message to the company, which he pinned to a notice board, was later torn down and scattered over the floor. After conducting the Hofoper orchestra in a farewell concert performance of his Second Symphony on 24 November, Mahler left Vienna for New York in early December.

=== Philharmonic concerts ===
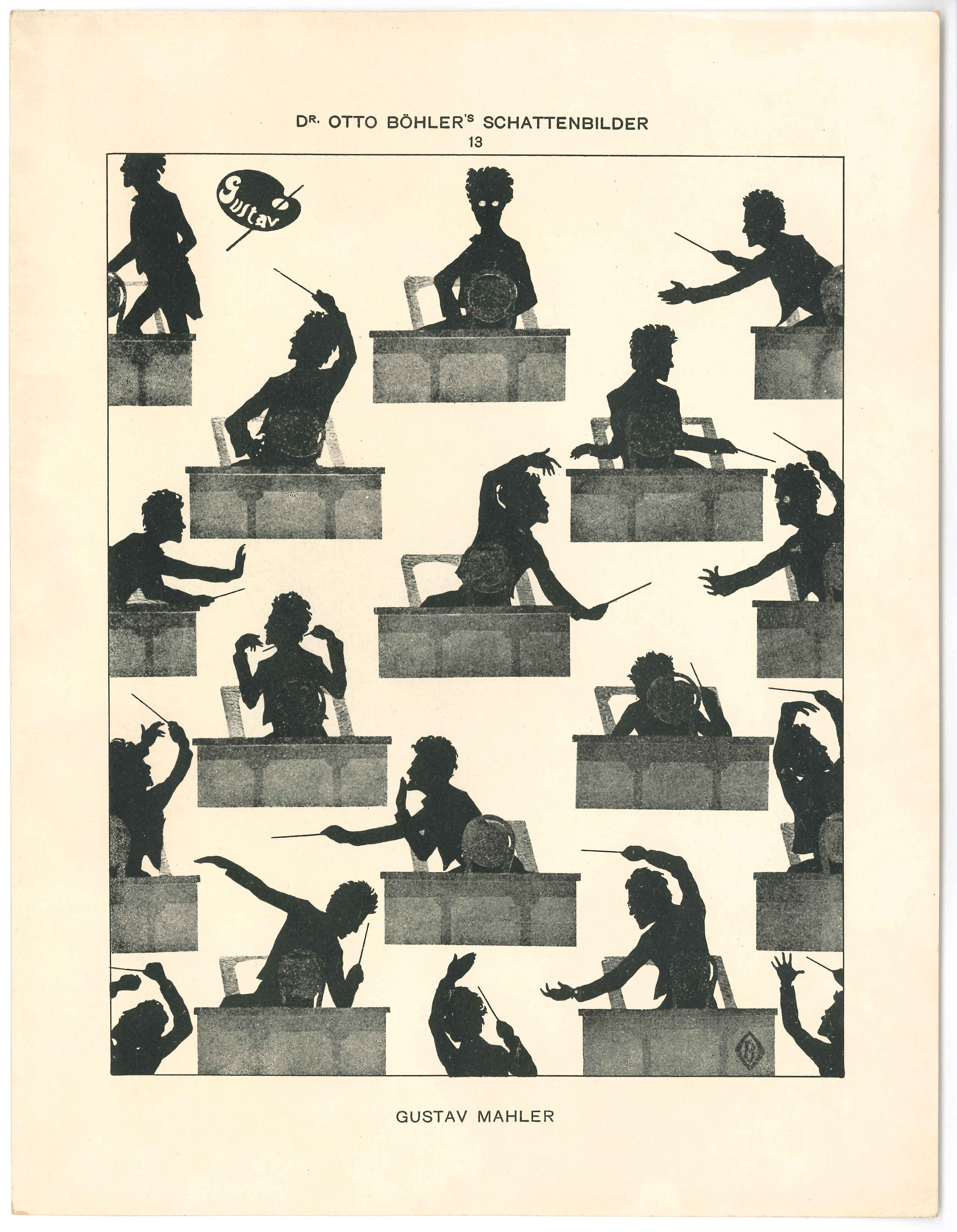
Silhouette by Otto Böhler

When Richter resigned as head of the Vienna Philharmonic subscription concerts in September 1898, (Note: The subscription concerts were an annual programme of orchestral concerts, performed by the Vienna Philharmonic Orchestra which comprised the elite instrumentalists from the Hofoper. Mahler was therefore well known to the players before he began his duties as the concerts conductor.) the concerts committee had unanimously chosen Mahler as his successor. The appointment was not universally welcomed; the anti-Semitic press wondered if, as a non-German, Mahler would be capable of defending German music. Attendances rose sharply in Mahler's first season, but members of the orchestra were particularly resentful of his habit of re-scoring acknowledged masterpieces, and of his scheduling of extra rehearsals for works with which they were thoroughly familiar. An attempt by the orchestra to have Richter reinstated for the 1899 season failed, because Richter was not interested. Mahler's position was weakened when, in 1900, he took the orchestra to Paris to play at the Exposition Universelle. The Paris concerts were poorly attended and lost money—Mahler had to borrow the orchestra's fare home from the Rothschilds. In April 1901, dogged by a recurrence of ill-health and wearied by more complaints from the orchestra, Mahler relinquished the philharmonic concerts conductorship. In his three seasons he had performed around 80 different works, which included pieces by relatively unknown composers such as Hermann Goetz, Wilhelm Kienzl and the Italian Lorenzo Perosi.

=== Mature composer ===
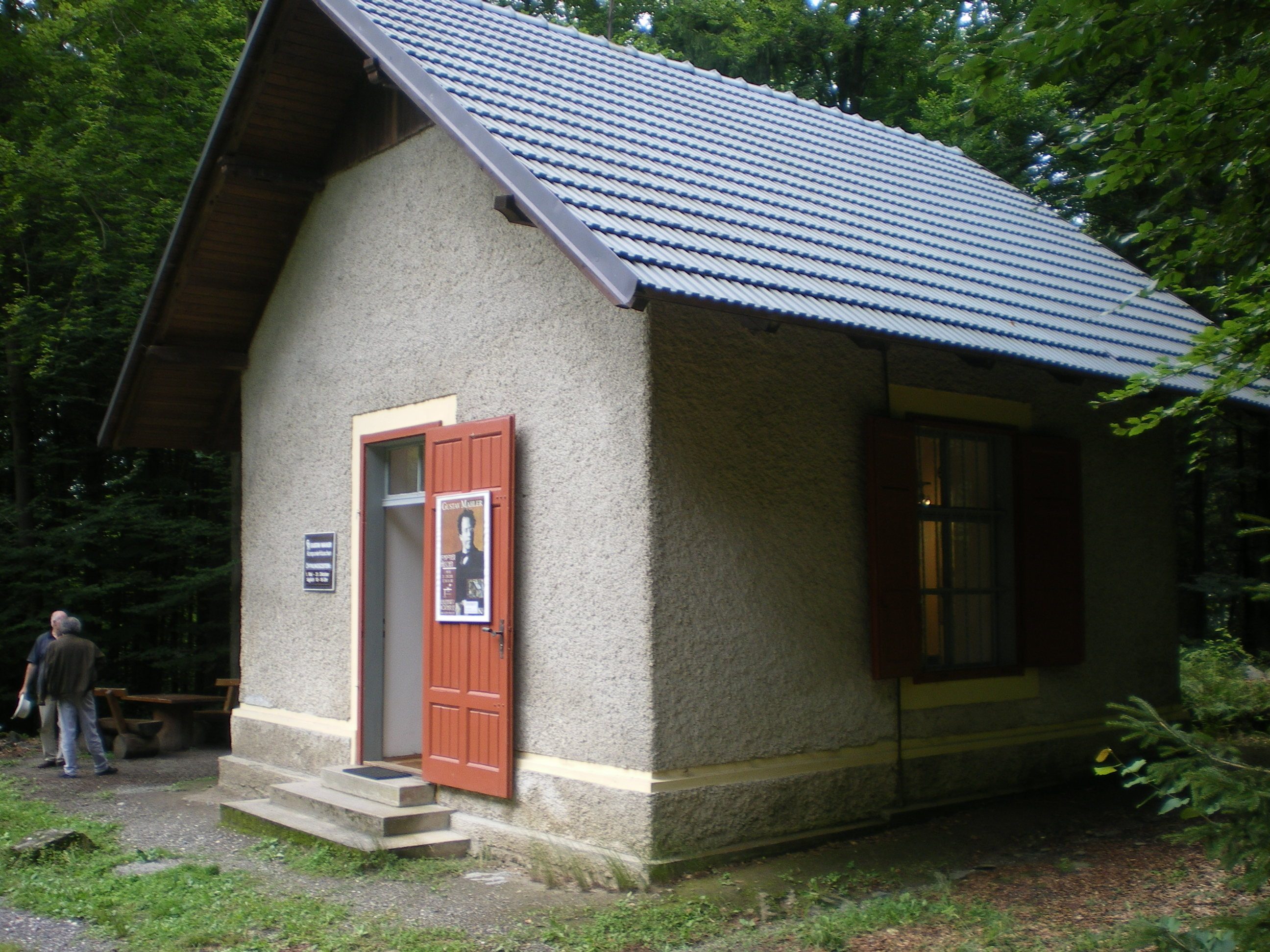
Mahler's second composing hut, at Maiernigg (near Klagenfurt), on the shores of the Wörthersee in Carinthia

The demands of his twin appointments in Vienna initially absorbed all Mahler's time and energy, but by 1899 he had resumed composing. The remaining Vienna years were to prove particularly fruitful. While working on some of the last of his Des Knaben Wunderhorn settings he started his Fourth Symphony, which he completed in 1900. By this time he had abandoned the composing hut at Steinbach and had acquired another, at Maiernigg on the shores of the Wörthersee in Carinthia, where he later built a villa. In this new venue Mahler embarked upon what is generally considered as his "middle" or post-Wunderhorn compositional period. Between 1901 and 1904 he wrote ten settings of poems by Friedrich Rückert, five of which were collected as Rückert-Lieder. (Note: One of the Rückert poems, "Liebst du um Schönheit", was left unorchestrated until this was carried out by a Leipzig musician, Max Puttmann. The song is usually performed alongside the others.) The other five formed the song cycle Kindertotenlieder ("Songs on the Death of Children"). The trilogy of orchestral symphonies, the Fifth, the Sixth and the Seventh were composed at Maiernigg between 1901 and 1905, and the Eighth Symphony written there in 1906, in eight weeks of furious activity.

Within this same period Mahler's works began to be performed with increasing frequency. In April 1899 he conducted the Viennese premiere of his Second Symphony; 17 February 1901 saw the first public performance of his early work Das klagende Lied, in a revised two-part form. Later that year, in November, Mahler conducted the premiere of his Fourth Symphony, in Munich, and was on the rostrum for the first complete performance of the Third Symphony, at the Allgemeiner Deutscher Musikverein festival at Krefeld on 9 June 1902. Mahler "first nights" now became increasingly frequent musical events; he conducted the first performances of the Fifth and Sixth Symphonies at Cologne and Essen respectively, in 1904 and 1906. Four of the Rückert-Lieder, and Kindertotenlieder, were introduced in Vienna on 29 January 1905.

=== Marriage, family, tragedy ===
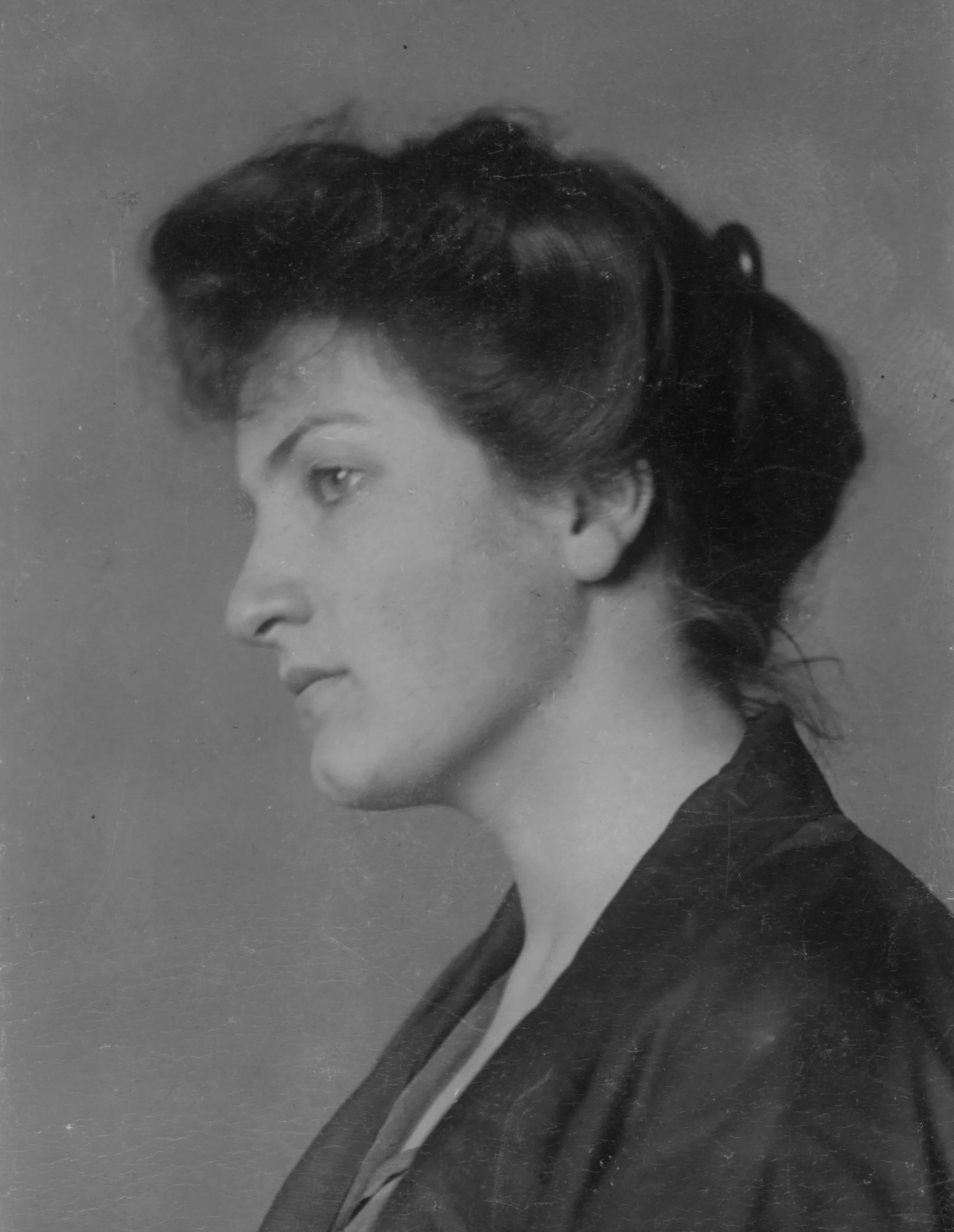
Alma Schindler, who married Mahler in 1902 (from 1902, possibly earlier)

During his second season in Vienna, Mahler acquired a spacious modern apartment on the Auenbruggergasse and built a summer villa on land he had acquired next to his new composing studio at Maiernigg. In November 1901, he met Alma Schindler, the stepdaughter of painter Carl Moll, at a social gathering that included the theatre director Max Burckhard. Alma was not initially keen to meet Mahler, on account of "the scandals about him and every young woman who aspired to sing in opera." The two engaged in a lively disagreement about a ballet by Alexander von Zemlinsky (Alma was one of Zemlinsky's pupils), but agreed to meet at the Hofoper the following day. This meeting led to a rapid courtship; Mahler and Alma were married at a private ceremony on 9 March 1902. Alma was by then pregnant with her first child, a daughter Maria Anna, who was born on 3 November 1902. A second daughter, Anna, was born in 1904.

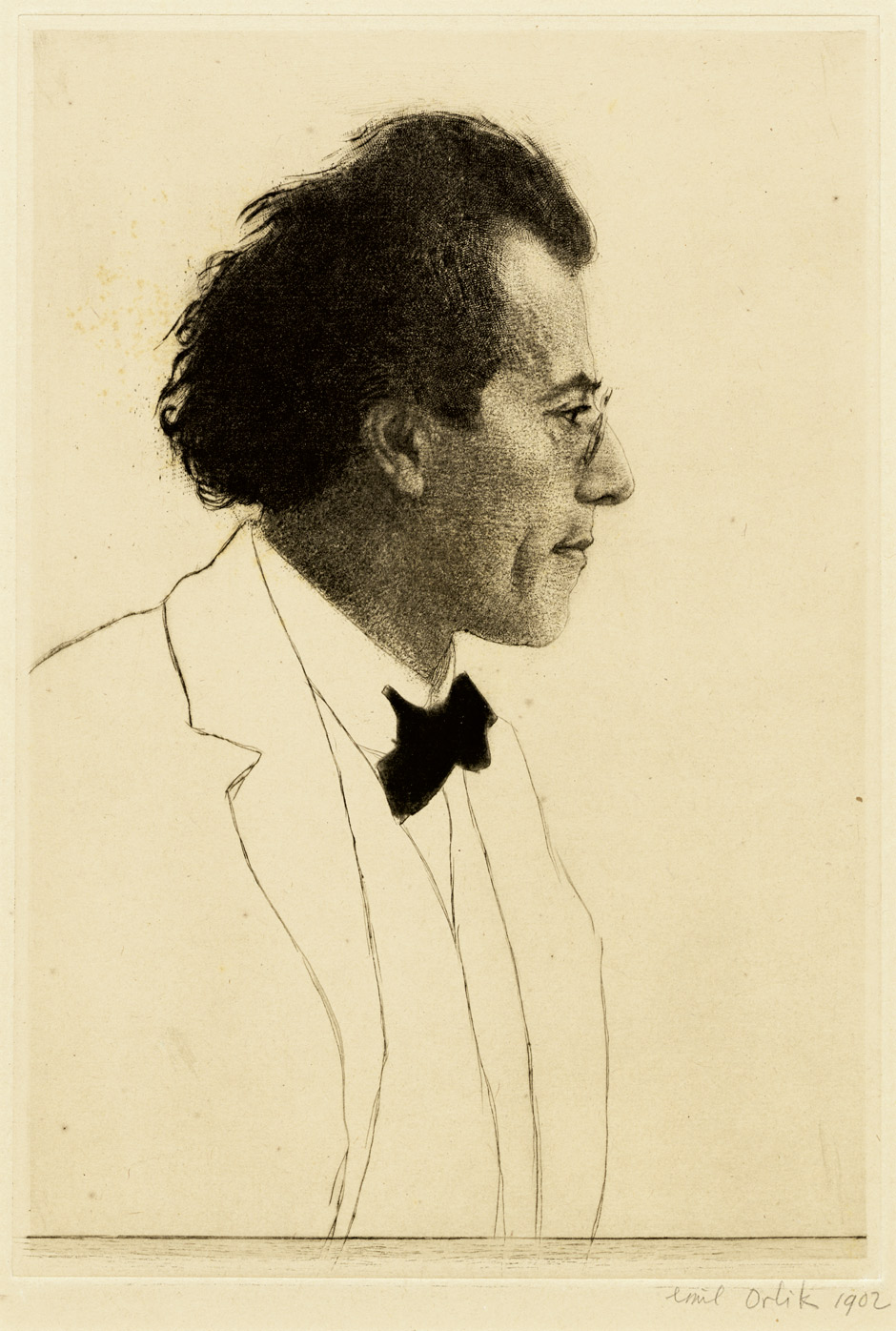
1902 portrait by Emil Orlík

Friends of the couple were surprised by the marriage and dubious of its wisdom. Burckhard called Mahler "that rachitic degenerate Jew", unworthy for such a good-looking girl of good family. On the other hand, Mahler's family considered Alma to be flirtatious, unreliable, and too fond of seeing young men fall for her charms. Mahler was by nature moody and authoritarian—Natalie Bauer-Lechner, his earlier partner, said that living with him was "like being on a boat that is ceaselessly rocked to and fro by the waves." Alma soon became resentful because of Mahler's insistence that there could only be one composer in the family and that she had given up her music studies to accommodate him. "The role of composer, the worker's role, falls to me, yours is that of a loving companion and understanding partner ... I'm asking a very great deal – and I can and may do so because I know what I have to give and will give in exchange." She wrote in her diary: "How hard it is to be so mercilessly deprived of ... things closest to one's heart." Mahler's requirement that their married life be organized around his creative activities imposed strains, and precipitated rebellion on Alma's part; the marriage was nevertheless marked at times by expressions of considerable passion, particularly from Mahler. (Note: See, for example, the letters to Alma sent from Munich in 1910, the last of which begins: "My beloved, madly beloved Almschili! Believe me, I am sick with love!" Carr, however, notes the extent to which Alma Mahler edited and selected the letters which she published in her book Memories and Letters, initially published in 1940.)

In the summer of 1907 Mahler, exhausted from the effects of the campaign against him in Vienna, took his family to Maiernigg. Soon after their arrival both daughters fell ill with scarlet fever and diphtheria. Anna recovered, but after a fortnight's struggle Maria died on 12 July. Immediately following this devastating loss, Mahler learned that his heart was defective, a diagnosis subsequently confirmed by a Vienna specialist, who ordered a curtailment of all forms of vigorous exercise. The extent to which Mahler's condition disabled him is unclear; Alma wrote of it as a virtual death sentence, though Mahler himself, in a letter written to her on 30 August 1907, said that he would be able to live a normal life, apart from avoiding over-fatigue. The illness was, however, a further depressing factor. Mahler and his family left Maiernigg and spent the rest of the summer at Schluderbach. At the end of the summer the villa at Maiernigg was closed and never revisited.

== Last years, 1908–1911 ==
=== New York ===
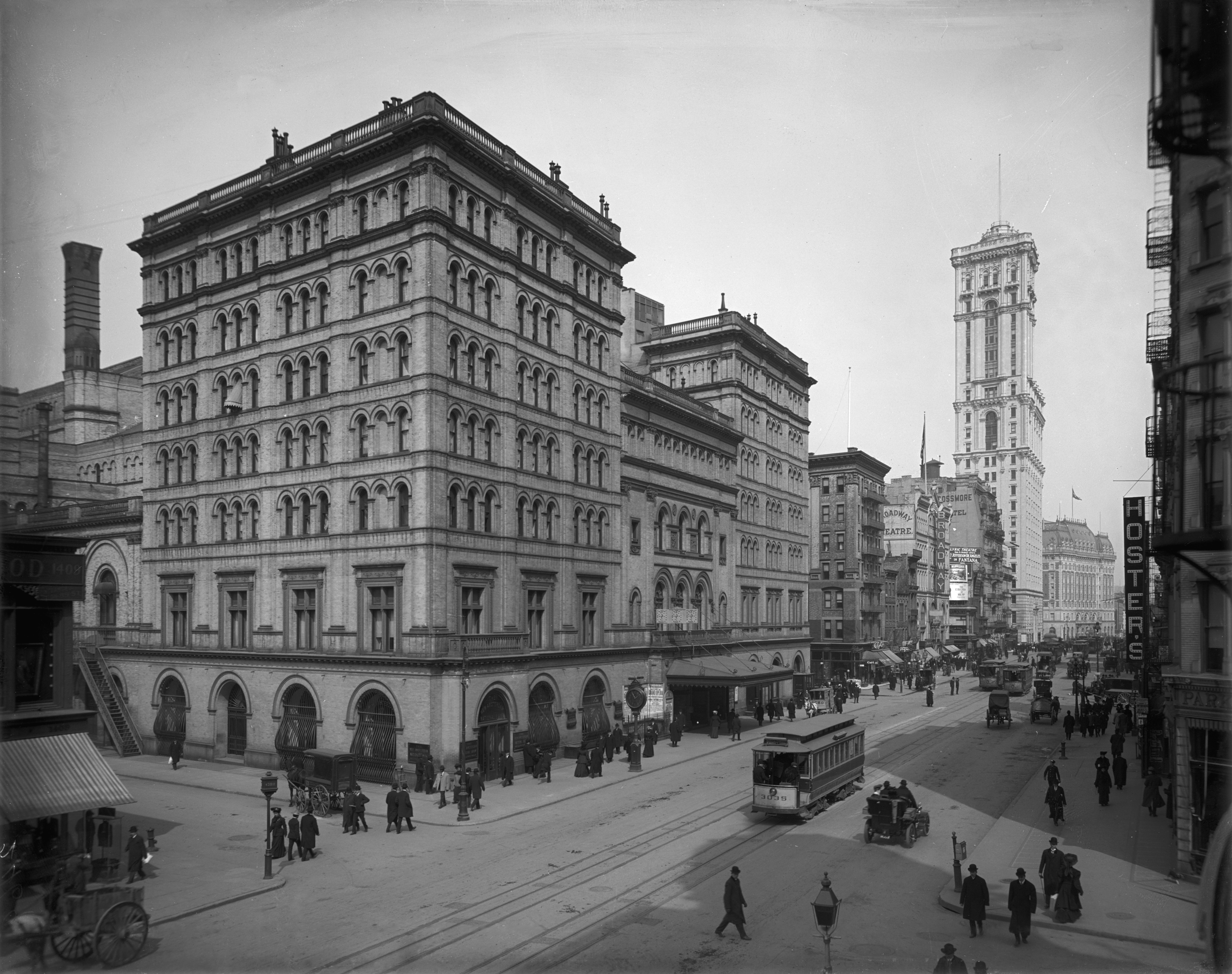
Metropolitan Opera House (39th Street) in New York, at around the time of Mahler's conductorship (1908–09)

Mahler made his New York debut at the Metropolitan Opera on 1 January 1908, when he conducted Wagner's Tristan und Isolde. In a busy first season Mahler's performances were widely praised, especially his Fidelio on 20 March 1908, in which he insisted on using replicas that were at the time being made of Alfred Roller's Vienna sets. On his return to Austria for the summer of 1908, Mahler established himself in the third and last of his composing studios, in the pine forests close to Toblach in Tyrol. Here, using a text by Hans Bethge based on ancient Chinese poems, he composed Das Lied von der Erde ("The Song of the Earth"). Despite the symphonic nature of the work, Mahler refused to number it, hoping thereby to escape the "curse of the Ninth Symphony" that he believed had affected fellow-composers Beethoven, Schubert and Bruckner. On 19 September 1908 the premiere of the Seventh Symphony, in Prague, was deemed by Alma Mahler a critical rather than a popular success.

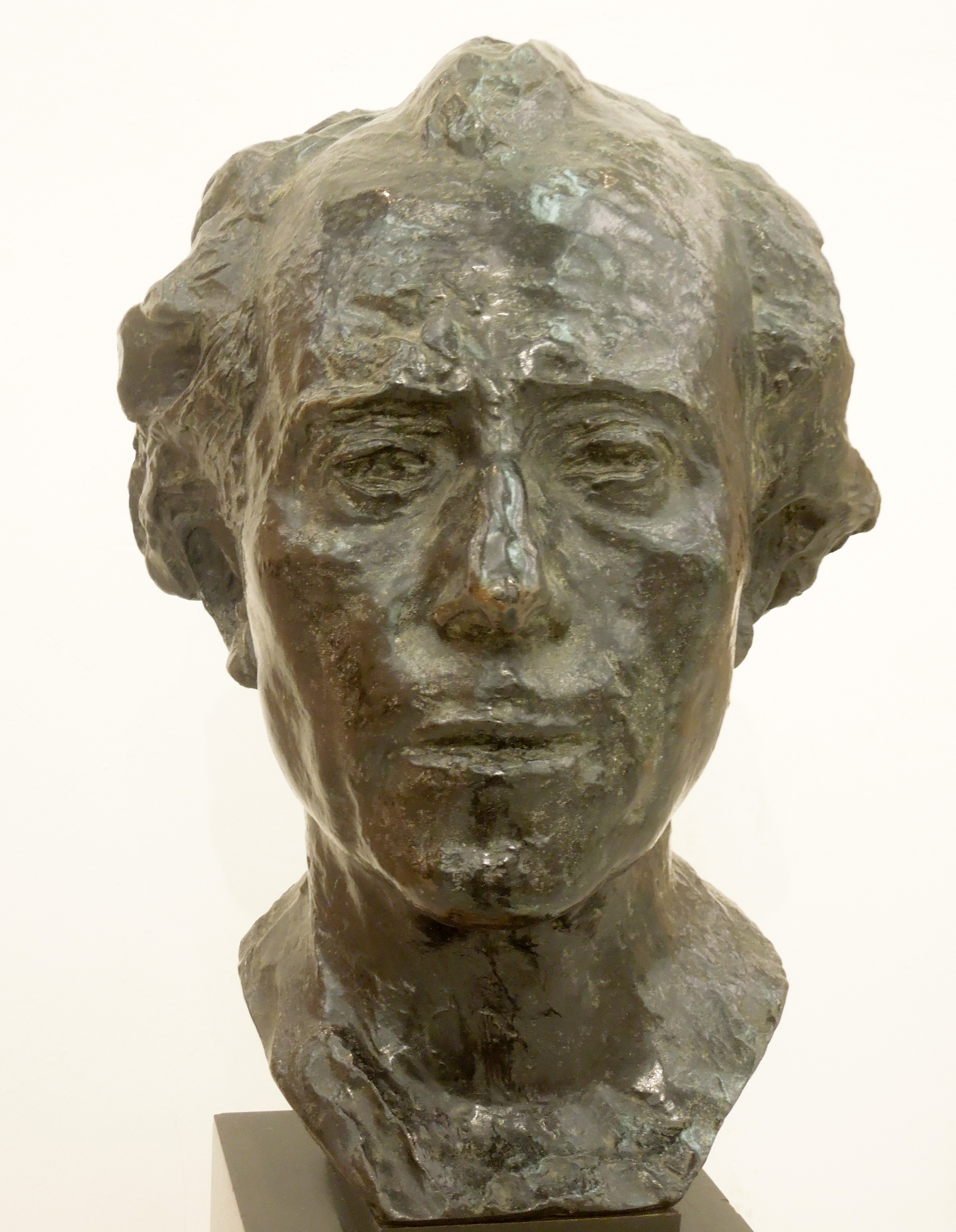
Bronze bust of Mahler by Auguste Rodin, 1909

For its 1908–09 season the Metropolitan management brought in the Italian conductor Arturo Toscanini to share duties with Mahler, who made only 19 appearances in the entire season. One of these was a much-praised performance of Smetana's The Bartered Bride on 19 February 1909. In the early part of the season Mahler conducted three concerts with the New York Symphony Orchestra. This renewed experience of orchestral conducting inspired him to resign his position with the opera house and accept the conductorship of the re-formed New York Philharmonic. He continued to make occasional guest appearances at the Met, his last performance being Tchaikovsky's The Queen of Spades on 5 March 1910.

Back in Europe for the summer of 1909, Mahler worked on his Ninth Symphony and made a conducting tour of the Netherlands. The 1909–10 New York Philharmonic season was long and taxing; Mahler rehearsed and conducted 46 concerts, but his programmes were often too demanding for popular tastes. His own First Symphony, given its American debut on 16 December 1909, was one of the pieces that failed with critics and public, and the season ended with heavy financial losses. The highlight of Mahler's 1910 summer was the first performance of the Eighth Symphony at Munich on 12 September, the last of his works to be premiered in his lifetime. The occasion was a triumph—"easily Mahler's biggest lifetime success", according to Carr—but it was overshadowed by the composer's discovery, before the event, that Alma had begun an affair with the young architect Walter Gropius. Greatly distressed, Mahler sought advice from Sigmund Freud, and appeared to gain some comfort from his meeting with the psychoanalyst. One of Freud's observations was that much damage had been done by Mahler's insisting that Alma give up her composing. Mahler accepted this, and started to positively encourage her to write music, even editing, orchestrating and promoting some of her works. Alma agreed to remain with Mahler, although the relationship with Gropius continued surreptitiously. In a gesture of love, Mahler dedicated his Eighth Symphony to her.

=== Illness and death ===
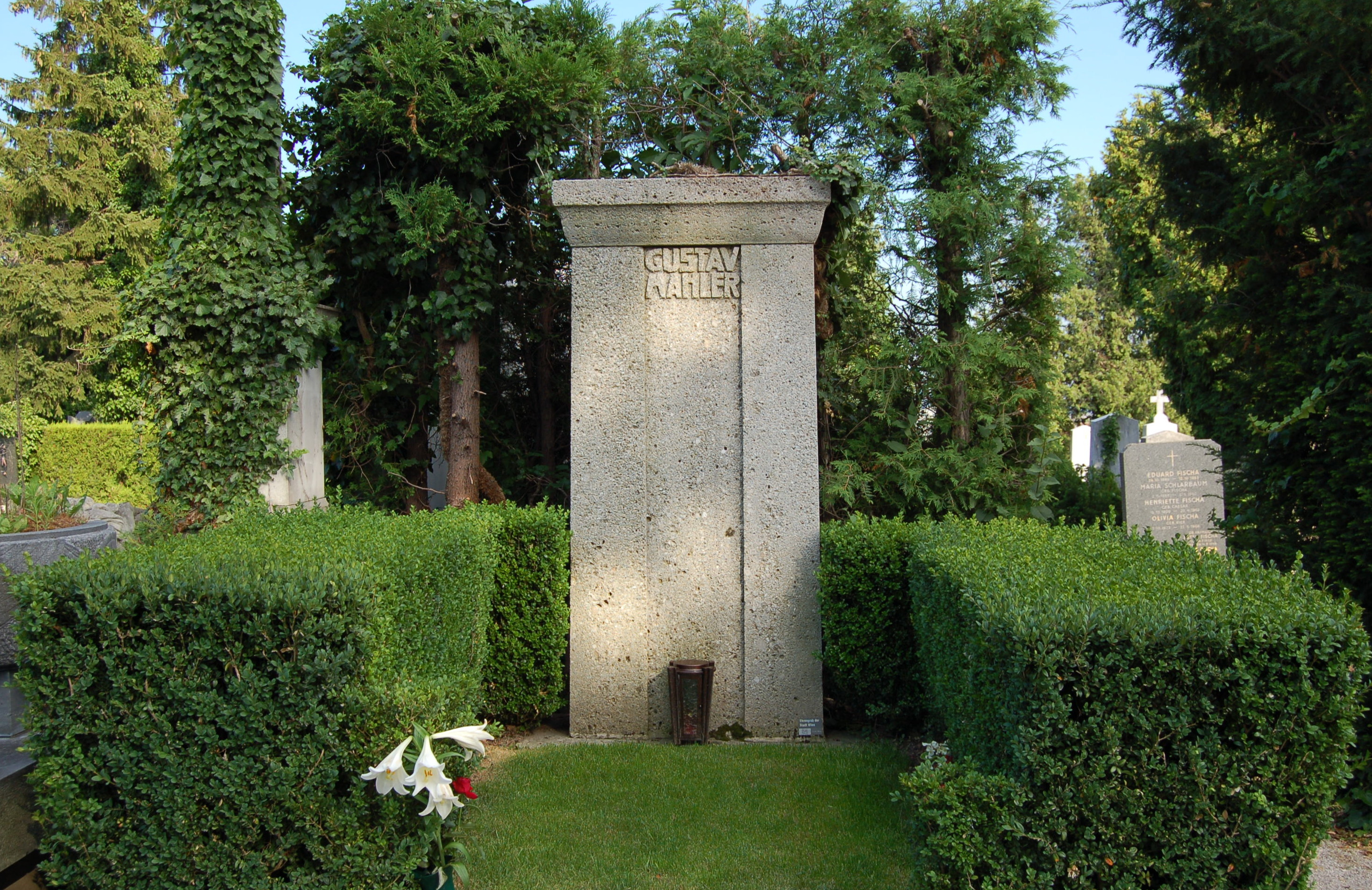
Mahler's grave in the Grinzing cemetery, Vienna

In spite of the emotional distractions, during the summer of 1910 Mahler worked on his Tenth Symphony, completing the Adagio and drafting four more movements. He and Alma returned to New York in late October 1910, where Mahler threw himself into a busy philharmonic season of concerts and tours. Around Christmas 1910 he began suffering from a sore throat, which persisted. On 21 February 1911, with a temperature of 40 °C (104 °F), Mahler insisted on fulfilling an engagement at Carnegie Hall, with a program of mainly new Italian music, including the world premiere of Busoni's Berceuse élégiaque. This was Mahler's last concert. After weeks confined to bed he was diagnosed with bacterial endocarditis, a disease to which people with defective heart valves were particularly prone and which could be fatal. Mahler did not give up hope; he talked of resuming the concert season, and took a keen interest when one of Alma's compositions was sung at a public recital by the soprano Frances Alda, on 3 March. On 8 April the Mahler family and a permanent nurse left New York on board SS Amerika bound for Europe. They reached Paris ten days later, where Mahler entered a clinic at Neuilly, but there was no improvement; on 11 May he was taken by train to the Löw sanatorium in Vienna, where he developed pneumonia and slipped into a coma. Hundreds had come to the sanatorium during this brief period to show their admiration for the great composer. After receiving treatments of radium to reduce swelling on his legs and morphine for his general ailments, he died on 18 May, aged 50.

On 22 May 1911 Mahler was buried in the Grinzing cemetery, as he had requested, next to his daughter Maria. His tombstone was inscribed only with his name because "any who come to look for me will know who I was and the rest don't need to know." Alma, on doctors' orders, was absent, but among the mourners at a relatively pomp-free funeral were Arnold Schoenberg (whose wreath described Mahler as "the holy Gustav Mahler"), Bruno Walter, Alfred Roller, the Secessionist painter Gustav Klimt, and representatives from many of the great European opera houses. The New York Times, reporting Mahler's death, called him "one of the towering musical figures of his day", but discussed his symphonies mainly in terms of their duration, incidentally exaggerating the length of the Second Symphony to "two hours and forty minutes". In London, The Times obituary said his conducting was "more accomplished than that of any man save Richter", and that his symphonies were "undoubtedly interesting in their union of modern orchestral richness with a melodic simplicity that often approached banality", though it was too early to judge their ultimate worth.

Alma Mahler survived her husband by more than 50 years, dying in 1964. She married Walter Gropius in 1915, divorced him five years later, and married the writer Franz Werfel in 1929. In 1940 she published a memoir of her years with Mahler, entitled Gustav Mahler: Memories and Letters. This account was criticised by later biographers as incomplete, selective and self-serving, and for providing a distorted picture of Mahler's life. (Note: The term "Alma Problem" has been used to refer to the difficulties that Alma's distortions have created for subsequent historians. Jonathan Carr writes: "[B]it by bit, more about Alma has emerged to cast still graver doubt on her published work ... Letters from Mahler to her have come to light in a more complete form than she chose to reveal. It is now plain that Alma did not just make chance mistakes and see things 'through her own eyes.' She doctored the record.") The composer's daughter Anna Mahler became a well-known sculptor; she died in 1988. The International Gustav Mahler Society was founded in 1955 in Vienna, with Bruno Walter as its first president and Alma Mahler as an honorary member. The society aims to create a complete critical edition of Mahler's works, and to commemorate all aspects of the composer's life.

== Music ==
=== Three creative periods ===
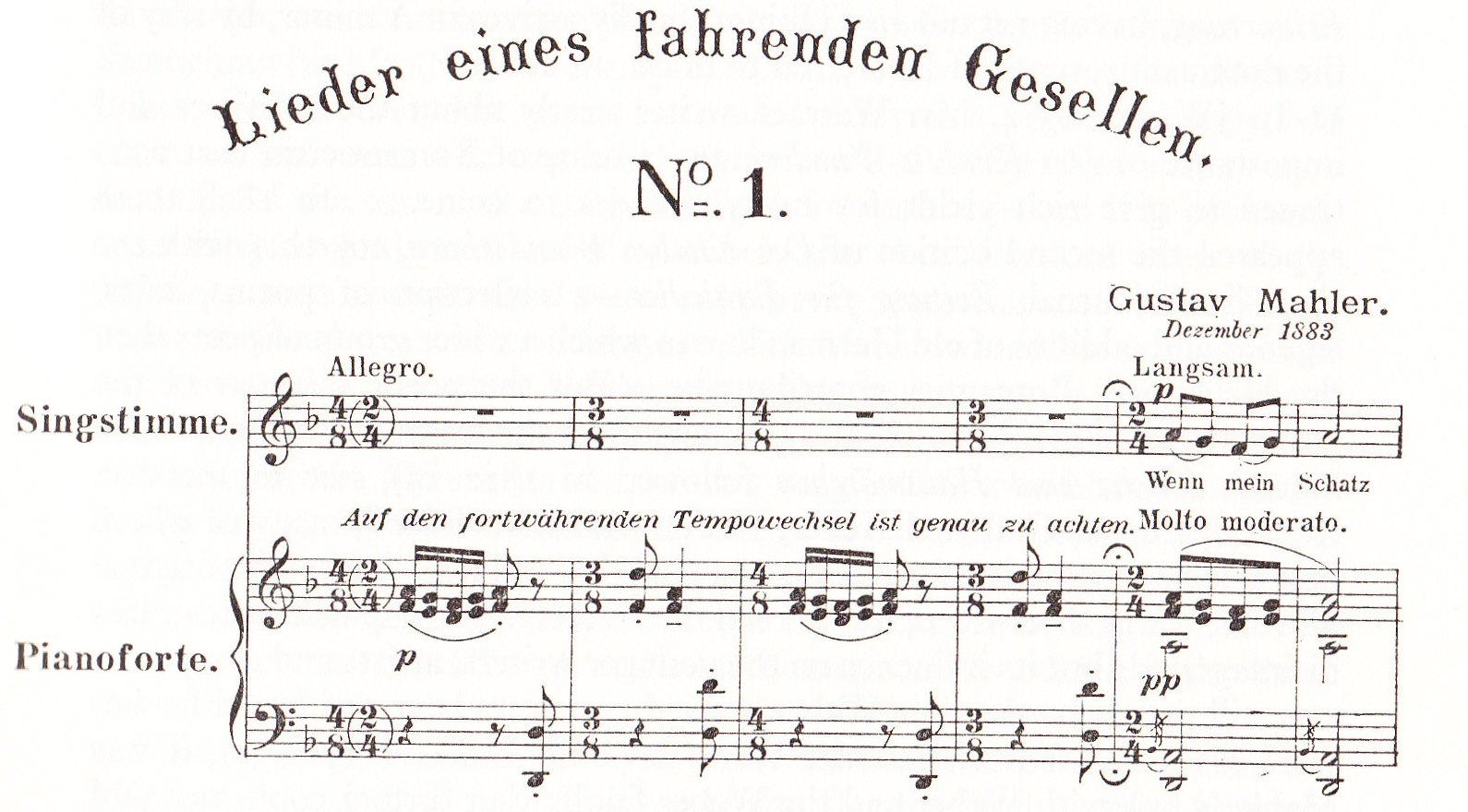
Opening of Lieder eines fahrenden Gesellen, published 1897 in a version for voice and piano

Deryck Cooke and other analysts have divided Mahler's composing life into three distinct phases: a long "first period", extending from Das klagende Lied in 1880 to the end of the Wunderhorn phase in 1901; a "middle period" of more concentrated composition ending with Mahler's departure for New York in 1907; and a brief "late period" of elegiac works before his death in 1911.

The main works of the first period are the first four symphonies, the Lieder eines fahrenden Gesellen song cycle and various song collections in which the Wunderhorn songs predominate. In this period songs and symphonies are closely related and the symphonic works are programmatic. Mahler initially gave the first three symphonies full descriptive programmes, all of which he later repudiated. He devised, but did not publish, titles for each of the movements for the Fourth Symphony; from these titles the German music critic Paul Bekker conjectured a programme in which Death appears in the Scherzo "in the friendly, legendary guise of the fiddler tempting his flock to follow him out of this world."

The middle period comprises a triptych of purely instrumental symphonies (the Fifth, Sixth and Seventh), the "Rückert" songs and the Kindertotenlieder, two final Wunderhorn settings and, in some reckonings, Mahler's last great affirmative statement, the choral Eighth Symphony. Cooke believes that the Eighth stands on its own, between the middle and final periods. Mahler had by now abandoned all explicit programmes and descriptive titles; he wanted to write "absolute" music that spoke for itself. Cooke refers to "a new granite-like hardness of orchestration" in the middle-period symphonies, while the songs have lost most of their folk character, and cease to fertilise the symphonies as explicitly as before.

The three works of the brief final period—Das Lied von der Erde, the Ninth and (incomplete) Tenth Symphonies—are expressions of personal experience, as Mahler faced death. Each of the pieces ends quietly, signifying that aspiration has now given way to resignation. Cooke considers these works to be a loving (rather than a bitter) farewell to life; the composer Alban Berg called the Ninth "the most marvellous thing that Mahler ever wrote". None of these final works were performed in Mahler's lifetime.

=== Antecedents and influences ===
Mahler was a "late Romantic", part of an ideal that placed Austro-German classical music on a higher plane than other types, through its supposed possession of particular spiritual and philosophical significance. He was one of the last major composers of a line which includes, among others, Beethoven, Schubert, Liszt, Wagner, Bruckner and Brahms. From these antecedents Mahler drew many of the features that were to characterise his music. Thus, from Beethoven's Ninth Symphony came the idea of using soloists and a choir within the symphonic genre. From Beethoven, Liszt and (from a different musical tradition) Berlioz came the concept of writing music with an inherent narrative or "programme", and of breaking away from the traditional four-movement symphony format. The examples of Wagner and Bruckner encouraged Mahler to extend the scale of his symphonic works well beyond the previously accepted standards, to embrace an entire world of feeling.

Early critics maintained that Mahler's adoption of many different styles to suit different expressions of feeling meant that he lacked a style of his own; Cooke on the other hand asserts that Mahler "redeemed any borrowings by imprinting his [own] personality on practically every note" to produce music of "outstanding originality." The music critic Harold Schonberg sees the essence of Mahler's music in the theme of struggle, in the tradition of Beethoven. However, according to Schonberg, Beethoven's struggles were those of "an indomitable and triumphant hero", whereas Mahler's are those of "a psychic weakling, a complaining adolescent who ... enjoyed his misery, wanting the whole world to see how he was suffering." Yet, Schonberg concedes, most of the symphonies contain sections in which Mahler the "deep thinker" is transcended by the splendour of Mahler the musician.

=== Genre ===
Except for his juvenilia, little of which has survived, Mahler composed only in the media of song and symphony, with a close and complex interrelationship between the two. (Note: Donald Mitchell differentiates between "song" and "song-cycle"; he also disparages the term "song-symphonist", which he calls "a horrid cliché that belongs to the dubious history of Mahler's critics.") Donald Mitchell writes that this interaction is the backcloth against which all Mahler's music can be considered. The initial connection between song and symphony occurs with the song cycle Lieder eines fahrenden Gesellen and the First Symphony. Although this early evidence of cross-fertilisation is important, it is during Mahler's extended Wunderhorn phase, in which his Second, Third and Fourth Symphonies were written, that the song and symphony genres are consistently intermingled. Themes from the Wunderhorn song Das himmlische Leben ("The Heavenly Life"), composed in 1892, became a key element in the Third Symphony completed in 1896; the song itself forms the finale to the Fourth (1900) and its melody is central to the whole composition. For the Second Symphony, written between 1888 and 1894, Mahler worked simultaneously on the Wunderhorn song, Des Antonius von Padua Fischpredigt ("The Sermon of St Anthony of Padua to the Fishes"), and on the Scherzo based on it which became the symphony's third movement. Another Wunderhorn setting from 1892, Urlicht ("Primal Light"), is used as the Second Symphony's fourth (penultimate) movement.

In Mahler's middle and late periods, the song–symphony relationship is less direct. However, musicologist Donald Mitchell notes specific relationships between the middle period songs and their contemporaneous symphonies—the second Kindertotenlieder song and the Adagietto from the Fifth Symphony, the last Kindertotenlieder song and the Sixth Symphony finale. Mahler's last work employing vocal and orchestral forces, Das Lied von der Erde, is subtitled "A Symphony ..."—Mitchell categorises it as a "song and symphony."

=== Style ===
The union of song and symphonic form in Mahler's music is, in Cooke's view, organic; "his songs flower naturally into symphonic movements, being already symphonic in cast." To Sibelius, Mahler expressed the belief that "The symphony must be like the world. It must embrace everything." True to this belief, Mahler drew material from many sources into his songs and symphonic works: bird calls and cow-bells to evoke nature and the countryside, bugle fanfares, street melodies and country dances to summon the lost world of his childhood. Life's struggles are represented in contrasting moods: the yearning for fulfilment by soaring melodies and chromatic harmony, suffering and despair by discord, distortion and grotesquerie. Amid all this is Mahler's particular hallmark—the constant intrusion of banality and absurdity into moments of deep seriousness, typified in the second movement of the Fifth Symphony when a trivial popular tune suddenly cuts into a solemn funeral march. The trite melody soon changes its character, and in due course re-emerges as one of the majestic Brucknerian chorales which Mahler uses to signify hope and the resolution of conflict. Mahler himself recognised the idiosyncrasies in his work, calling the Scherzo in the Third Symphony "the most farcical and at the same time the most tragic piece that ever existed ... It is as though all nature is making faces and sticking out its tongue."

The range of musical moods, Cooke maintains, comes from Mahler's "amazing orchestration" which, in the writer's view, defies analysis—"it speaks for itself." Franklin lists specific features which are basic to Mahler's style: extremes of volume, the use of off-stage ensembles, unconventional arrangement of orchestral forces, and frequent recourse to popular music and dance forms such as the ländler and the waltz. Musicologist Vladimír Karbusický maintains that the composer's Jewish roots had lasting effects on his creative output; he pinpoints the central part of the third movement of the First Symphony as the most characteristically "Yiddish" music in Mahler's work. The Czech composer-journalist Max Brod has also identified Jewish tunes and rhythms in Mahler's music.

A technical device much used by Mahler is that of "progressive tonality", which Deryck Cooke describes as "the procedure of resolving a symphonic conflict in a different key from that in which it was stated", and which is often used "to symbolise the gradual ascendancy of a certain value by progress from one key to another over the whole course of a symphony". This technique was also used by Mahler's Danish contemporary Carl Nielsen. Mahler first employed the device in an early song, Erinnerung ("Memory"), and thereafter used it freely in his symphonies. For example, the predominant key of the First Symphony is D major; at the beginning of the Finale, the "conflict" movement, the key switches to F minor, and only after a lengthy battle gets back to D, near the end. The Second Symphony begins in C minor and ends in E♭. The movements of the Fifth Symphony progress successively from C♯ minor to A minor, then D major, F major and finally to D major. The Sixth Symphony, unusually for Mahler, begins and ends in the same key, A minor, signifying that in this case the conflict is unresolved.

=== Reception ===
==== Early responses, 1889–1911 ====
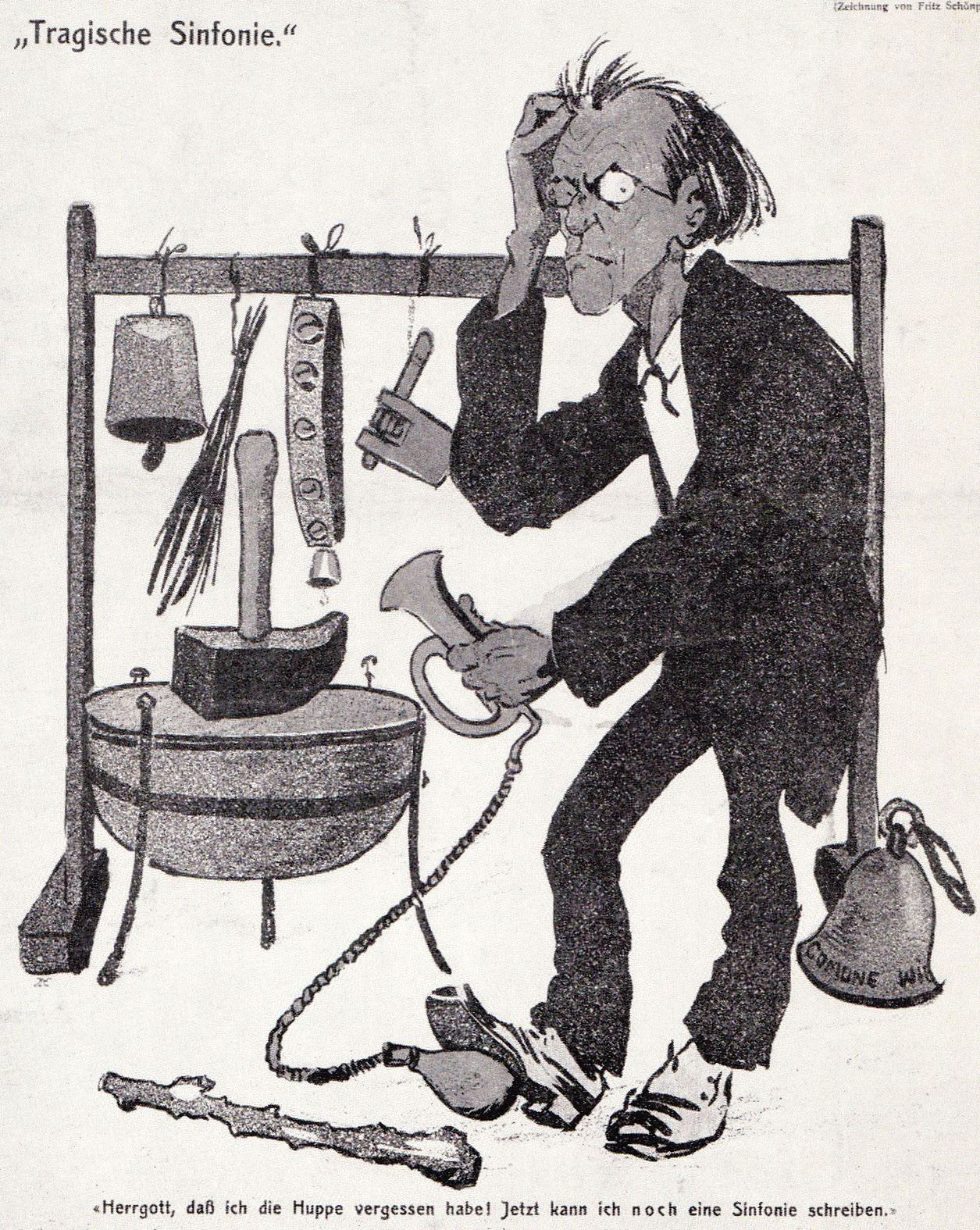
A satirical comment on Mahler's Sixth Symphony. The caption translates: "My God, I've forgotten the motor horn! Now I shall have to write another symphony."

Mahler's friend Guido Adler calculated that at the time of the composer's death in 1911 there had been more than 260 performances of the symphonies in Europe, Russia and America, the Fourth Symphony with 61 performances given most frequently (Adler did not enumerate performances of the songs). In his lifetime, Mahler's works and their performances attracted wide interest, but rarely unqualified approval; for years after its 1889 premiere critics and public struggled to understand the First Symphony, described by one critic after an 1898 Dresden performance as "the dullest [symphonic] work the new epoch has produced". The Second Symphony was received more positively, one critic calling it "the most masterly work of its kind since Mendelssohn". Such generous praise was rare, particularly after Mahler's accession to the Vienna Hofoper directorship. His many enemies in the city used the anti-Semitic and conservative press to denigrate almost every performance of a Mahler work; thus the Third Symphony, a success in Krefeld in 1902, was treated in Vienna with critical scorn: "Anyone who has committed such a deed deserves a couple of years in prison."

A mix of enthusiasm, consternation and critical contempt became the normal response to new Mahler symphonies, although the songs were better received. After his Fourth and Fifth Symphonies failed to gain general public approval, Mahler was convinced that his Sixth would finally succeed. However, its reception was dominated by satirical comments on Mahler's unconventional percussion effects—the use of a wooden mallet, birch rods and a huge square bass drum. Viennese critic Heinrich Reinhardt dismissed the symphony as "Brass, lots of brass, incredibly much brass! Even more brass, nothing but brass!" The one unalloyed performance triumph within Mahler's lifetime was the premiere of the Eighth Symphony in Munich, on 12 September 1910, advertised by its promoters as the "Symphony of a Thousand". (Note: The title "Symphony of a Thousand" was not acknowledged by Mahler. Jonathan Carr indicates that, at its Munich premiere, there were fewer than 1000 performers present. At the American premiere under Leopold Stokowski in 1916, however, there were 1,068 performers, including 950 choristers.) At its conclusion, applause and celebrations reportedly lasted for half an hour.

==== Relative neglect, 1911–1950 ====
Performances of Mahler's works became less frequent after his death. In the Netherlands the advocacy of Willem Mengelberg ensured that Mahler remained popular there, and Mengelberg's engagement with the New York Philharmonic from 1922 to 1928 brought Mahler regularly to American audiences. However, much American critical reaction in the 1920s was negative, despite a spirited effort by the young composer Aaron Copland to present Mahler as a progressive, 30 years ahead of his time and infinitely more inventive than Richard Strauss. Earlier, in 1916, Leopold Stokowski had given the American premieres of the Eighth Symphony and Das Lied von der Erde in Philadelphia. The Eighth was a sensationally successful performance that was immediately taken to New York where it scored a further triumph.

An early proponent of Mahler's work in Britain was Adrian Boult, who as conductor of the City of Birmingham Orchestra performed the Fourth Symphony in 1926 and Das Lied von der Erde in 1930. The Hallé Orchestra brought Das Lied and the Ninth Symphony to Manchester in 1931; Sir Henry Wood staged the Eighth in London in 1930, and again in 1938 when the young Benjamin Britten found the performance "execrable" but was nevertheless impressed by the music. British critics during this period largely treated Mahler with condescension and faint praise. Thus Dyneley Hussey, writing in 1934, thought the "children's songs" were delightful, but that the symphonies should be let go. Composer-conductor Julius Harrison described Mahler's symphonies as "interesting at times, but laboriously put together" and as lacking creative spark. Bernard Shaw reported that the younger generation of the 1930s found Mahler (and Bruckner) "expensively second-class".

Before Mahler's music was banned as "degenerate" during the Nazi era, the symphonies and songs were played in the concert halls of Germany and Austria, often conducted by Bruno Walter or Mahler's younger assistant Otto Klemperer, and also by Willem Mengelberg. In Austria, Mahler's work experienced a brief renaissance between 1934 and 1938, a period known today as 'Austrofascism', when the authoritarian regime with the help of Alma Mahler and Bruno Walter, who were both on friendly terms with the new chancellor Kurt Schuschnigg, sought to make Mahler into a national icon (with a status comparable to that of Wagner in Germany). Mahler's music was performed during the Nazi era in Berlin in early 1941 and in Amsterdam during the German occupation of the Netherlands by Jewish orchestras and for Jewish audiences alone; works performed included the Second Symphony (Berlin), the First and Fourth Symphonies, and the Songs of a Wayfarer (Amsterdam).

==== Modern revival ====
According to American composer David Schiff, his compatriot Leonard Bernstein used to imply that he had single-handedly rescued Mahler from oblivion in 1960, after 50 years of neglect. Schiff points out that such neglect was only relative—far less than the (incomplete) disregard of Bach in the years after his death. Although Bernstein gave the Mahler revival further impetus, it was well under way before 1960, sustained by conductors such as Stokowski, Dimitri Mitropoulos and John Barbirolli, and by the long-time Mahler advocate Aaron Copland. Mahler himself predicted his place in history, once commenting: "Would that I could perform my symphonies for the first time 50 years after my death!"

Deryck Cooke argues that Mahler's popularity escalated when a new, postwar generation of music lovers arose, untainted by "the dated polemics of anti-romanticism" which had affected Mahler's reputation in the inter-war years. In this more-liberated age, enthusiasm for Mahler expanded even into places—Spain, France, Italy—which had long been resistant to him. Jonathan Carr's simpler explanation for the 1950s Mahler revival is that "it was the long-playing record [in the early 1950s] rather than the Zeitgeist which made a comprehensive breakthrough possible. Mahler's work became accessible and repeatable in the home." In the years following his centenary in 1960, Mahler rapidly became one of the most performed and most recorded of all composers, and has largely remained thus. In Britain and elsewhere, Carr notes, the extent of Mahler performances and recordings has replaced a relative famine with a glut, bringing problems of over-familiarity. Harold Schonberg comments that "it is hard to think of a composer who arouses equal loyalty", adding that "a response of anything short of rapture to the Mahler symphonies will bring [to the critic] long letters of furious denunciation."

In a letter to Alma dated 16 February 1902, Mahler wrote, with reference to Richard Strauss: "My day will come when his is ended. If only I might live to see it, with you at my side!" Carr observes that Mahler could conceivably have lived to see "his day"; his near-contemporary Richard Strauss survived until 1949, while Sibelius, just five years younger than Mahler, lived until 1957.

=== Later influence ===
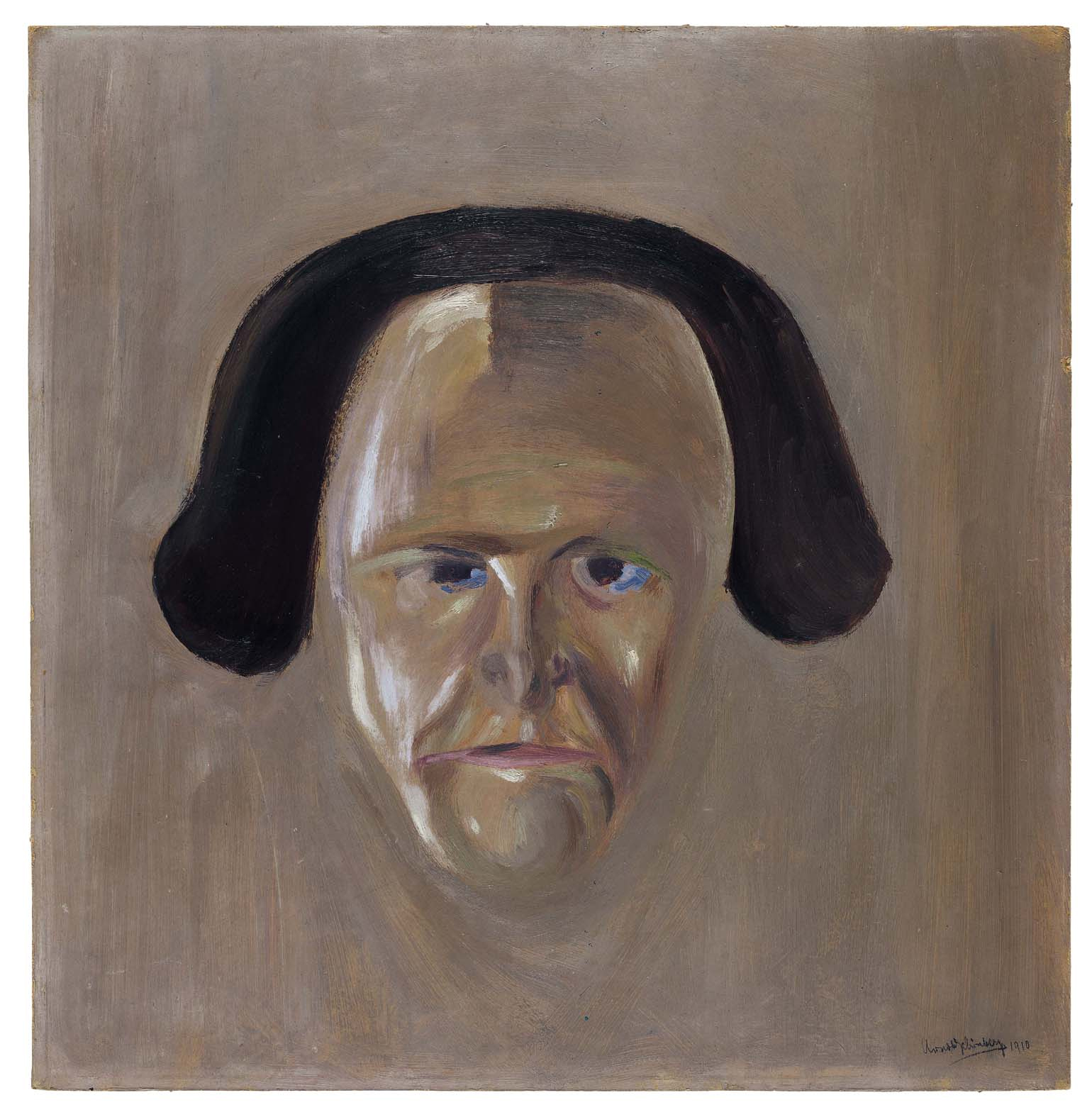
Schoenberg painted Mahler's portrait in 1910.

Donald Mitchell writes that Mahler's influence on succeeding generations of composers is "a complete subject in itself". Mahler's first disciples included Arnold Schoenberg and his pupils Alban Berg and Anton Webern, who together founded the Second Viennese School. Mahler's music influenced the trio's move from progressive tonalism to atonality (music without a key); although Mahler rejected atonality, he became a fierce defender of the bold originality of Schoenberg's work. At the premiere of the latter's First String Quartet in February 1907, Mahler reportedly was held back from physically attacking the hecklers. Schoenberg's Serenade, Op. 24 (1923), Berg's Three Pieces for Orchestra (1915) and Webern's Six Pieces (1928) all carry echoes of Mahler's Seventh Symphony. Mahler has also influenced the film scores of John Williams and other Hollywood composers.

Among other composers whose work carries the influence of Mahler, Mitchell lists America's Aaron Copland, the German song and stage composer Kurt Weill, Italy's Luciano Berio, Russia's Dmitri Shostakovich and England's Benjamin Britten. The American composers Leonard Bernstein and Samuel Barber were also influenced by Mahler's work. In a 1989 interview the pianist-conductor Vladimir Ashkenazy said that the connection between Mahler and Shostakovich was "very strong and obvious"; their music represented "the individual versus the vices of the world." Mitchell highlights Britten's "marvellously keen, spare and independent writing for the wind in ... the first movement of the Cello Symphony of 1963 [which] clearly belongs to that order of dazzling transparency and instrumental emancipation which Mahler did so much to establish." Mitchell concludes with the statement: "Even were his own music not to survive, Mahler would still enjoy a substantial immortality in the music of these pre-eminent successors who have embraced his art and assimilated his techniques." A 2016 BBC Music Magazine survey of 151 conductors ranked three of his symphonies in the top ten symphonies of all time.

== Memorials and museums ==
In Hamburg, the Gustav Mahler Museum is dedicated to Gustav Mahler's life and work. It is situated in the Composers Quarter. In Altschluderbach, near Toblach in South Tyrol, Italy, there remains a little museum and memorial in the former composer's hut of Mahler. It is situated in the animal park next to the Gustav Mahler Stube. The Stube formerly had a museum on the first floor. There, Mahler and his wife Alma resided from 1907 to 1910. Two of the other composer's huts used by Mahler still exist; both are equipped as little museums. There is one composing hut at the Attersee, Upper Austria, and one at the Wörthersee in Carinthia. Mount Mahler in the Rocky Mountains of Colorado is named in honour of the composer.
