= Siegfried Lipiner =

Austrian writer (1856–1911)

Siegfried Salomo Lipiner (24 October 1856 – 30 December 1911) was a writer and poet from Austria-Hungary whose works made an impression on Richard Wagner and Friedrich Nietzsche, but who published nothing after 1880 and lived out his life as Librarian of Parliament in Vienna. A poet and dramatist of highly individual character, he is today remembered in German-speaking literary circles mainly for his translations of the Polish poet Adam Mickiewicz; he is also known to music history as having been a close friend of Gustav Mahler.

== Life ==
Lipiner was born in Jarosław. A prodigious talent, he produced a well-regarded treatment of 'Prometheus Unbound' in 1876, He attended the University of Leipzig as a student of philosophy, literature and natural science; one of his teachers was Gustav Fechner. By his early twenties, he had produced an important work on the philosophy of Arthur Schopenhauer, and become a personal acquaintance of Nietzsche, who had called him 'a veritable genius'. They did correspond but never met. Lipiner met Wagner who admired the writer, but didn't like the man.

Lipiner's ideas are against pessimism. He shows the way to faith. Gustav Mahler used to ask him many metaphysical questions, in order to overcome his own doubts.

Lipiner was 24 when he met the 20-year-old Mahler, and his views on various subjects (including the 'redemptive' qualities of artistic creation) came to influence the young composer to a considerable extent. Lipiner features in the 'Recollections of Gustav Mahler' assembled by Natalie Bauer-Lechner — who seems also to have kept a similar record of his actions and conversations, though this is now lost.

As his creativity waned, Lipiner's reputation seems to have depended more and more upon his personal fascination as a 'bon viveur' and skilled improviser of the philosophical rhapsodies with which he would entertain his circle of illustrious acquaintances in Vienna. Mahler's marriage to Alma Schindler in 1902 was followed by the composer's breaking with Lipiner for several years: the man whom Friedrich Eckstein described as 'that shy, melancholy, sensitive poet' and whom Mahler usually addressed as 'dearest Siegfried' was for Alma the object of a venomous dislike: "a bogus Goethe in his writing and a haggling Jew in his talk". By the end of Mahler's life, however, the two men had resumed their friendship. Lipiner died in Vienna a few months after Mahler's death.

Lipiner translated Mickiewicz, the Totenfeier (1887).

Lipiner was a librarian at the Reichsrat in Vienna, for 30 years.

== Works ==
- Der Entfesselte Prometheus. Eine Dichtung in 5 Gesängen. Leipzig 1876;
- Renatus. Epische Dichtung. Leipzig 1878;
- Ueber die Elemente einer Erneuerung religiöser Ideen der Gegenwart. Vortrag gehalten im Leseverein der deutschen Studenten Wien. Wien 1878;
- Buch der Freude. [Gedichte] Leipzig 1880;
- Bruder Rausch (Fragment eines Epos) 1883;
- Merlin. Operndichtung in 3 Akten. Musik von Karl Goldmark. Textbuch. Leipzig 1886;
- Homunculus. Eine Studie über 'Faust' und die Philosophie Goethes. Diss. Wien 1894;
- Kassandra. Drama 1910;
- Adam. Ein Vorspiel. Stuttgart 1913, Bern 1974;
- Hippolytos. Drama 1893;
- Der neue Don Juan. Trauerspiel in 5 Akten. Stuttgart 1914;
- Herr Thaddäus oder Der letzte Eintritt in Litauen: ein Epos aus der Napoleonischen Zeit. Von Adam Mickiewicz, übers. von S. L. Freiburg im Breisgau 1951.

Bibliography : Gabriele BREZINA, Siegfried Lipiner, dissertation, 1925. Hartmut von HARTUNGEN, Der Dichter Siegfried Lipiner, Dissertation, Univ. of Munich, 1932
