= Natalie Bauer-Lechner =

Austrian musician (1858–1921)

- Born: Natalia Anna Juliana Lechner; May 9, 1858; Penzing, Vienna, Austrian Empire
- Died: June 8, 1921 (aged 63); Vienna, First Austrian Republic
- Education: University of Music and Performing Arts Vienna
- Occupation: Violist
- Spouse: Alexander Bauer (m. 1875-85)
- Children: 1?

Natalie [Natalia Anna Juliana] Bauer-Lechner (Penzing, Vienna, 9 May 1858 – Vienna, 8 June 1921) was an Austrian violist who is best known to musicology for having been a close and devoted friend of Gustav Mahler in the period between 1890 and the start of Mahler's engagement to Alma Schindler in December 1901. During this period, she kept a private journal which provides a unique picture of Mahler's personal, professional and creative life during and just after his thirties, including an exclusive preview of the structure, form, and content of his third symphony.

== Biography ==
Bauer-Lechner was the eldest of five children (four girls and a boy) born to the Viennese bookshop owner and publisher Rudolf Lechner (1822–1895) and his wife Julie, née von Winiwarter (1831–1905). She was educated privately, and from 1866 to 1872 she and her sister Ellen (28 July 1859 – 24 March 1940) studied at the Vienna Conservatory. Both sisters completed their studies on 25 July 1872 with second prize (cf. Neue Freie Presse, Vienna, 28 July 1872, p. 7). Natalie was only 14 years old. In view of what occurred three years later (her sudden marriage and becoming the stepmother of three children), it is difficult to see how she would find time to take part in the orchestral rehearsals at the Conservatoire during Mahler's student years from 1875 to 1878, as Bauer-Lechner later claims in her memoirs on Mahler. However, from various press notices in the Viennese dailies it was clearly her sister Ellen (or Helene) who frequently appeared on such occasions, and also in chamber music concerts with director Joseph Hellmesberger Sr. In 1910 Ellen Schlenk-Lechner formed her own short-lived string quartet with three males. In 1883, she had already published a Polonaise in D Major Op. 1, for violin and piano.

=== Marriage and divorce ===
Most surprisingly and inexplicably, Natalie, only 17½ years old, married the 39-year-old widowed professor Dr. ph. Alexander Bauer (1836–1921) on 27 December 1875 in Vienna. His first wife Emilie (née Russell) had died from pneumonia on 22 March 1874, only one day after she had given birth to her third daughter (cf. Wiener Zeitung, 26 March 1874, p. 8). The two other children were eleven and eight years old respectively. It has therefore been speculated by the Danish Mahler scholar Knud Martner that the last-born daughter, christened in a Protestant church (though both parents were Catholics) on 7 April 1874 and named Minnie Emilie Forster Bauer (she died on 31 July 1956), was in fact the illegitimate child of young Natalie. By comparing photographs of Bauer-Lechner and the young Minnie Bauer, their features look strikingly similar, and she looks quite different from her two elder sisters.

Her marriage, however, childless as it appears to have been, was dissolved ten years later, on 19 June 1885. Nothing is known about Bauer-Lechner's life between 1885 and 1890. Apparently she did not take an active part in the Viennese musical scene during this period, at least not according to the daily newspapers. Not even her whereabouts are known.

=== The Soldat-Roeger String Quartet ===
In March 1895, Bauer-Lechner became the violinist of the newly-formed all-female Soldat-Roeger String Quartet, led by Joachim's student Maria Soldat-Roeger. Each year, the Quartet three concerts in Vienna (s total of 51 concerts between 1895 and 1913), and it also toured in Austria-Hungary, Germany, France, Britain and other European countries. After eighteen years, the Quartet was finally dissolved in March 1913. Between 1909 and 1912 Natalie Bauer-Lechner arranged four solo concerts in Vienna and appeared from time to time as soloist in various German cities. As a trained professional musician, Bauer-Lechner grasped the technical and aesthetic content of Mahler's conversation. She noted many of his statements about music, literature, philosophy and life at some length and apparently verbatim.

=== Later years ===
In her later years, Bauer-Lechner became an outspoken feminist, and in 1918 she allegedly published an article on the war and the need for female suffrage, which led to her arrest and imprisonment. The article in question has never been traced. Her health subsequently collapsed, and she died in Vienna in poverty, only a few months after her former husband.

=== Erinnerungen an Gustav Mahler ===
The publication history of her principal work is complicated. The source is a voluminous collection of notes entitled Mahleriana, apparently deriving from some thirty diaries which no longer exist. During her life, brief extracts were published in two Viennese journals: anonymously in Der Merker (March 1912, pp. 182–88), and under her own name in Musikblätter des Anbruch (1920, pp. 306–9). Erinnerungen an Gustav Mahler was published in January 1923, and represents an edited selection from the available materials — as does the later volume Recollections of Gustav Mahler compiled in English (1980). The first German edition was republished in Hamburg in 1984 (slightly altered and with additional materials, edited by Herbert Killian (Vienna), with footnotes and commentaries by Knud Martner (Copenhagen)).

Recently owned by the late Mahler scholar Henry-Louis de la Grange, the Mahleriana manuscript is not intact: numerous pages have been torn out by unknown hands, and there is no indication of what they might have contained. During her life, Natalie Bauer-Lechner was in the habit of lending her manuscript to friends and acquaintances; E.H. Gombrich reports that his parents had it in their possession for some time, and it is presumably this practice that allowed material to be removed.

A collection of notes recording conversations with Mahler's long-standing friend Siegfried Lipiner is understood to have once existed among her papers. Its current whereabouts are unknown.

== Publications ==
- Bauer-Lechner, Natalie: Fragmente: Gelerntes und Gelebtes (Vienna, 1907).
- Bauer-Lechner, Natalie: Erinnerungen an Gustav Mahler (Vienna-Leipzig, 1923)
- Bauer-Lechner, Natalie: Recollections of Gustav Mahler (tr. Dika Newlin, ed. Peter Franklin; London, 1980)
- Bauer-Lechner, Natalie: Erinnerungen an Gustav Mahler (ed. Herbert Killian und Knud Martner; Hamburg, 1984)

== In fiction ==
The director Beate Thalberg achieved a docudrama based on her diary: My time will come.
