= List of museums in Austria =

This is a list of museums in Austria.

== By state ==
- List of museums in Burgenland
- List of museums in Carinthia (state)
- List of museums in Lower Austria
- List of museums in Salzburg (state)
- List of museums in Styria
- List of museums in Tyrol (state)
- List of museums in Upper Austria
- List of museums in Vienna
- List of museums in Vorarlberg

== See also ==
- List of museums by country
- List of natural history museums in Austria
- List of libraries in Austria
