= List of museums in Burgenland =

This list of museums in the state of Burgenland, Austria contains museums which are defined for this context as institutions (including nonprofit organizations, government entities, and private businesses) that collect and care for objects of cultural, artistic, scientific, or historical interest and make their collections or related exhibits available for public viewing. Also included are non-profit art galleries and university art galleries.

== The list ==
Name	Image	Location	Type	Summary
Austrian Jewish Museum		Eisenstadt	History	website, history of the Jews in Burgenland, features private synagogue
Bad Tatzmannsdorf Spa Museum		Bad Tatzmannsdorf	History	website, history of the town's hot water spa
Bad Tatzmannsdorf Bread Museum		Bad Tatzmannsdorf	Food	website, history of bread making
Bauernmuseum Jennersdorf		Jennersdorf	Agriculture	website, historic farm implements, furniture, tools
Bernstein Rock Museum		Bernstein im Burgenland	Natural history	website, serpentine mining, rocks, minerals
Burg Güssing		Güssing	Historic house	Medieval castle with collections of art, music, books, food, hunting, cast iron pieces, miniatures dioramas
Burg Lockenhaus		Lockenhaus	Historic house	Romanesque and Gothis fortress castle, exhibit about the Knights Templar
Burg Schlaining		Stadtschlaining	Historic house	Medieval castle, includes the European Museum for Peace
Burgenland Fire Fighters Museum		Eisenstadt	Firefighting	website
Burgenland History House		Bildein	History	website, website, area history
Burgenland State Gallery		Eisenstadt	Art	website, exhibits of local contemporary visual art
Castle of Arts		Potzneusiedl	Art	website, display of icons, center of art and antiques
Diözesanmuseum Eisenstadt		Eisenstadt	Religious	website, ecclesiastical art and artifacts of the Roman Catholic Diocese of Eisenstadt
Dorfmuseum Mönchhof		Mönchhof	Open air	website, includes farm buildings, guest house, school, theater, town hall, fire department, handicraft workshops, shops, milk house, grist mill, church
Emigrant Museum - Josef Reichl House		Güssing	Local	information, two museums in one building, history of area immigration to America and exhibit on local poet Josef Reichl
European Museum for Peace		Stadtschlaining	Peace	website, causes and structures of violence and war, ways out of everyday violence, located in Burg Schlaining, operated by the European Peace University
Forchtenstein Castle		Mattersburg	Historic house	Medieval fortress castle with restored baroque interiors, decorative arts and weapons collections
Freilichtmuseum Bad Tatzmannsdorf		Bad Tatzmannsdorf	Open air	website, residential and commercial buildings from the late 18th century to the beginning of the 20th century
Freilichtmuseum Ensemble Gerersdorf		Gerersdorf	Open air	website, thatched houses, farm buildings, agriculture life
Haydn-Haus Eisenstadt		Eisenstadt	Music	website, one of the homes of composer Joseph Haydn, exhibits of area music history
Haydn Church		Eisenstadt	Religious	website, includes the Joseph Haydn Mausoleum, treasury
Lackenbach Palace		Eisenstadt	Natural history	website, Renaissance palace and nature theme park, museum with exhibit on nature and the history of mankind, archaeology, hunting and forestry, wood, climate issues, tourism, art and culture
Landesmuseum Burgenland		Eisenstadt	Local	website, local history, culture, archaeology, art, folklore, natural history
Landtechnik-Museum Burgenland		Sankt Michael im Burgenland	Agriculture	website, agriculture machinery, tractors, steam machines, processors, harvesters, tools
Franz Liszt's birthplace		Raiding	Music	website, the life of the composer Franz Liszt
Mining Museum Goberling		Stadtschlaining	Mining	website, mining of antimony
Museum Jois		Jois	Local	website, includes 1938 classroom, wine making, local history
Museum Oberschützen		Oberschützen	Local	website, local history, folk culture
Museum of Clocks and Watches		Aschau	Horology	website, clock works, watches and clock making
Pinkafeld City Museum		Pinkafeld	Local	website, city history, culture, fossils, archaeological finds
Roman Museum St. Martin		Sankt Martin an der Raab	Archaeology	website, excavated Roman artifacts and remains
Schloss Deutschkreutz		Oberpullendorf	Art	website, works by Anton Lehmden
Schloss Esterházy		Eisenstadt	Historic house	Baroque palace, gardens, wine museum
Schnapsmuseum Neusiedl bei Güssing		Neusiedl bei Güssing	Beverages	website, culture and the art of distilling
Stadtschlaining City Museum		Stadtschlaining	Local	website, city history, culture
Steinmetz Museum Kaisersteinbruch		Bruckneudorf	Local	website, history, stone quarrying
Tower Museum		Breitenbrunn	Local	website, city history, culture, natural history
Wine Museum Burgenland		Eisenstadt	Wine	Located in Schloss Esterházy, history of area wine-making
Windmill Podersdorf		Podersdorf	Mill	website, working windmill
Wine Museum Moschendorf		Moschendorf	Beverages	website, information
Wine Museum Neckenmarkt		Neckenmarkt	Beverages	website,
