= List of museums in Carinthia =

This list of museums in the state of Carinthia, Austria contains museums which are defined for this context as institutions (including nonprofit organizations, government entities, and private businesses) that collect and care for objects of cultural, artistic, scientific, or historical interest and make their collections or related exhibits available for public viewing. Also included are non-profit art galleries and university art galleries.

== The list ==
Name	Image	Location	Type	Summary
Amthofmuseum Feldkirchen		Feldkirchen	Local	website, local history, culture, natural history
Archaeological Pilgrim Museum		Globasnitz	Archaeology	website, archaeological excavations carried out on the Hemmaberg Mountain and the East-Gothic cemetery
Archaeological Park Magdalensberg		Magdalensberg	Open-air	website, excavated Roman buildings and artifacts
Auer von Welsbach Museum		Althofen	Science	website, life and discoveries of scientist and inventor Carl Auer von Welsbach including gas lightings, metal filament light bulbs and pocket lighters, and an originally equipped laboratory
BIOS - Nationalpark Hohe Tauern		Mallnitz	Natural history	website, natural science of the Alps
Bonsai Museum		Seeboden	Art	website, art of bonsai and Japanese garden design
Burg Friesach		Friesach	Historic house	website, modern hand-built construction of an early medieval castle complex
Burg Sommeregg		Seeboden	History	Features a museum of medieval torture
Carinthia Open Air Museum		Maria Saal	Open-air	website, Austrian traditional farmhouses and rural craft buildings
Carinthian Craft Museum		Baldramsdorf	Art	website, rural crafts and working workshops including farming, working in wood, leather, metal, textiles, food making, construction
Carinthian Museum of Modern Art		Klagenfurt	Art	website
Carniolan Bee Museum		Ferlach	Natural history	information, seasonal, bee keeping and products
Carolingian Museum Moosburg		Moosburg	History	website, features archaeological artifacts dating back to the Carolingian dynasty
Celtic World in Frög		Rosegg	Open-air	website, recreated Celtic buildings
Death Dance Museum		Metnitz	Art	website, large Austrian frescoes showing a 15th-century death dance
Eboardmuseum		Klagenfurt	Music	website, Europe's largest collection of electronic keyboard instruments
Ehrental Castle Agricultural Museum		Klagenfurt	Agriculture	website, area peasant farm life from manual labor to machine labor
Elberstein Castle		Globasnitz	Historic house	website
Elli Riehl Museum		Winklern	Doll	website, local culture and life shown through dolls
Eva Faschaunerin Home Museum		Gmünd	Local	information, story of the last person to be sent to the gallows from Gmünd
Emblem Hall at the Landhaus		Klagenfurt	Art	website, Baroque coat of arms paintings in the former palace
Freihausgasse Gallery		Villach	Art	website, municipal art gallery of Austrian and international contemporary art
Friesach City Museum		Friesach	Local	Local history, mining, trade, culture
Gailtaler Heimatmuseum		Maria Saal	Local	website, natural history, archaeology, industry, history, crafts, culture
Granatium		Radenthein	Mining	website, garnet mining
Heinrich Harrer Museum		Hüttenberg	Biographical	website, life and travels of explorer and mountaineer Heinrich Harrer, ethnographic artifacts
Helga Riedel Doll Museum		Hüttenberg	Doll	website, local culture and life shown through dolls
Hochosterwitz Castle		Sankt Veit an der Glan	Historic house	Medieval fortress castle
Klagenfurt Mining Museum		Klagenfurt	Mining	website, mining, minerals, fossils,
Klagenfurt State Gallery		Klagenfurt	Art	website
Knappenberg Mining Museum		Knappenberg	Mining	website, local mining, minerals, tour of an old mine
Koschatmuseum Klagenfurt		Klagenfurt	Biography	information, memorial to the famous Carinthian musician and columnist Thomas Koschat
Maria Luggau Mill Museum		Maria Luggau	Mill	website, working watermills open for tour
Millstatt Abbey		Millstatt	History	History of the former abbey and local history and culture
Missonihaus		Feldkirchen	Local	website
Museum Carantana		Molzbichl	History	website, early medieval pottery, jewelry, church artifacts
Museum des Nötscher Kreises		Nötsch	Art	website, modern art, features art by Sebastian Isepp, Anton Kolig, Franz Wiegele and Anton Mahringer
Museum Historama		Ferlach	Transportation	website, heritage railroad, technology museum, model trains, trams
Museum im Lavanthaus		Wolfsberg	Local	website, culture, history, nature, people of the Lavant valley region
Museum Liaunig		Neuhaus	Art	website, contemporary art
Museum St. Veit		St. Veit	Transportation	website, railways, postal service, telecommunication, motorization, model trains, town history
Porsche Automuseum Helmut Pfeifhofer		Gmünd	Transportation	website, private museum of Porsche vehicles
Prof. Harry Jeschofnig Museum		Knappenberg	Art	website, naturalistic and abstract sculpture
Regional Museum of Carinthia		Klagenfurt	History	website, area history and natural history
Robert Musil Literature Museum		Klagenfurt	Biography	website, life and work of writer Robert Musil
Roman Museum Teurnia		St. Peter-in-Holz	Archaeology	website, excavated Roman settlement
Schloss Porcia		Spittal an der Drau	Multiple	Includes the Museum of Popular Culture
Schloss Rosegg		Rosegg	Multiple	Includes room displays with life-size wax figures, a wildlife park and a maze
Schloss Straßburg		Straßburg	Multiple	Includes rural life artifacts, textile, pipes, changing exhibits
Seppenbauer Gasthof-Automuseum		Friesach	Transportation	website, guesthouse with collection of Porsche vehicles
St. Paul's Abbey in the Lavanttal		Sankt Paul im Lavanttal	Art	Benedictine monastery with large collections of graphics, coins, sacred art and painting
Villach Automotive Museum		Villach	Transportation	website, cars, motorcycles, scooters, mopeds, motor-assisted bicycles
Villach City Museum		Villach	Local	website, local history, art, culture
Völkermarkt History Museum		Völkermarkt	Local	website
Composing hut of Gustav Mahler		Maria Wörth	Gustav Mahler	website
Werner Berg Museum		Bleiburg	Art	website, work by area artist Werner Berg
Wood Museum		Gnesau	Art	website, art and wood carvings, woodworking tools
