= List of museums in Upper Austria =

This list of museums in the state of Upper Austria, Austria contains museums which are defined for this context as institutions (including nonprofit organizations, government entities, and private businesses) that collect and care for objects of cultural, artistic, scientific, or historical interest and make their collections or related exhibits available for public viewing. Also included are non-profit art galleries and university art galleries.

== The list ==
Name	Location	Type	Summary
Alpineum	Hinterstoder	Local	website, mountain life including mountain farming, skiing and sports, rescues, natural history, forestry
Anton Bruckner Center	Ansfelden	Biographical	website, music venue adjacent to the Anton Bruckner Museum, birthplace of composer Anton Bruckner
Ars Electronica Center	Linz	Science	Science, modern digital technology and art
Austrian Rock Art Museum	Spital am Pyhrn	Archaeology	website, petroglyphs and rock art
Austrian Paper Making Museum	Laakirchen	Industry	website, paper making, printing, bookmaking
Ampflwang Railway Museum	Ampflwang im Hausruckwald	Railway	Steam locomotives
Bauer Furniture Museum Hirschbach	Hirschbach im Mühlkreis	Decorative arts	website, handcrafted rustic furniture
Biology Centre Linz	Linz	Natural history	website, animal and plant world, rocks and minerals
City Museum Gmunden	Gmunden	Local	website, local history, ceramics and salt industries
City Museum Ulrichsberg	Ulrichsberg	Art	information, features glass pieces from area manufacturers
Composing hut of Gustav Mahler	Steinbach am Attersee	Gustav Mahler	
Crime Museum Scharnstein	Grünau im Almtal	Law enforcement	website, history of the Austrian judicial and security system from the late Middle Ages to the present day
Dye Museum	Gutau	Textile	information, dyeing process
Ebensee Memorial	Ebensee	History	Guided tours of World War II concentration camp, museum of area history between 1918 and 1955
Gleink Abbey	Steyr	Religious	Former Benedictine abbey with museum of ecclesiastical embroidery and objects
Hafner House	Leopoldschlag	Decorative arts	website, earthenware making
Hallstatt Salt Mine	Hallstatt	Mining	website, tours of the working salt mine, linked to the Hallein Salt Mine
Haenel Pancera Museum	Bad Ischl	Art	website, collection of decorative arts, many from Asia
Heritage Museum Achental	Sixenhof	Rural	website, rural life, trades and crafts
Kaiservilla	Bad Ischl	Historic house	Summer palace of Kaiser Franz Joseph I and Empress Elisabeth of Austria (Sisi)
Keltendorf Mitterkirchen	Mitterkirchen im Machland	Living	website, reconstructed Hallstatt village complex
Kremsmünster Abbey	Kremsmünster	Multiple	Guided tours of the Benedictine monastery, collections of art, natural history
Landesgalerie Linz	Linz	Art	website, modern and contemporary art
Lentos Art Museum	Linz	Art	Modern art and sculpture
Lignorama Wood and Tool Museum	Riedau	Art	website, integrated life of wood, woodworking, use in building and art
Mauthausen Memorial	Mauthausen	History	Located at the former Mauthausen-Gusen concentration camp
Mechanical Museum Museum	Riedau	Music	website, mechanical music instruments
Museum Car, Technology, Aviation	Bad Ischl	Technology	website, technical development in transportation and the civil, military and agricultural sectors
Museum Lauriacum	Enns	Archaeology	website, artifacts from the Roman Legion camp Lauriacum including military equipment, grave monuments, ceiling fresco
Museum Hallstatt	Hallstatt	Archaeology	website, Hallstatt culture artifacts, salt mining
Museum of Bad Ischl	Bad Ischl	Local	website, local history, culture, art, art and artifacts from Asia and around the world
Museum of Labor	Steyr	History	website, mechanisms of international integration of production and their impact on work, life and society
Natural History Museum Salzkammergut	Ebensee	Natural history	website, area plants and animals
Nordico	Linz	Local	website, city history, archaeology, art, culture
Ochzethaus	Altheim	Archaeology	website, museum of life in Ancient Rome, open air excavations of ancient Roman villa
OK Centrum	Linz	Art	website, contemporary art
Protestant Museum of Upper Austria	Rutzenmoos	Religious	website
Schloss Hartheim	Alkoven	History	Renaissance castle used by the Nazis as the Hartheim Euthanasia Centre
Schloss Museum Linz	Linz	Multiple	website, art, decorative arts and crafts, musical instruments, numismatics, ethnography, archaeology
SKGLB Museum	Mondsee	Railway	
Skulpturenpark Artpark	Linz	Art	Sculpture garden
Tower 9 – Leonding City Museum	Leonding	Local	website, local history, culture
Villa Franz Lehár	Bad Ischl	Historic house	website, home of composer Franz Lehár
Villa Ingenious	Rohrbach in Oberösterreich	Art	website, perception through the five senses
Weaving Museum Haslach	Haslach an der Mühl	Textile	website, preparation of flax, manual and mechanical weaving
