= European Peace University =

- Type: Private university
- Established: 1988
- Rector: Gerald Mader
- Location: Stadtschlaining, Austria

The European University Center for Peace Studies offered postgraduate political studies from 1990 to 2013 in Stadtschlaining, Austria.

The institution was founded in 1988 by Gerald Mader in his capacity as president of the ASPR, with the support of European UNESCO commissions, and is affiliated to the Austrian Study Center for Peace and Conflict Resolution (ASPR), also located at Stadtschlaining.

The original curriculum of EPU was designed along the lines of Johan Galtung’s ”Plan for a Master of Peace and Conflict Resolution” which he developed for the University of Hawaii. The EPU has been offering postgraduate programs in Peace Studies since 1990. In 1995, EPU was co-winner of the UNESCO Prize for Peace Education. The EPU's UNESCO Chair on Peace, Human Rights and Democracy was established in 1996.

Between 2010 and 2013, the institute gained accredited private university status and was renamed to "European Peace University (EPU) - Private Universität". In July 2013, EPU's accreditation was withdrawn by Austria's accreditation body; students currently enrolled in the "Master of Arts in Peace and Conflict Studies" programme may finish their studies until 2014.

Primary goals of the EPU are:

- Spreading the idea of peace in the spirit of the UNESCO
- Giving scientific and educational support to global peace
- Promoting a "world domestic policy" based on sustainable development, cooperative responsibility and ecological security
- Contributing to the development of a global peace culture
- Training and improving individual capabilities in peace-making and conflict resolution
