= Josef Schicklgruber =

Austrian footballer

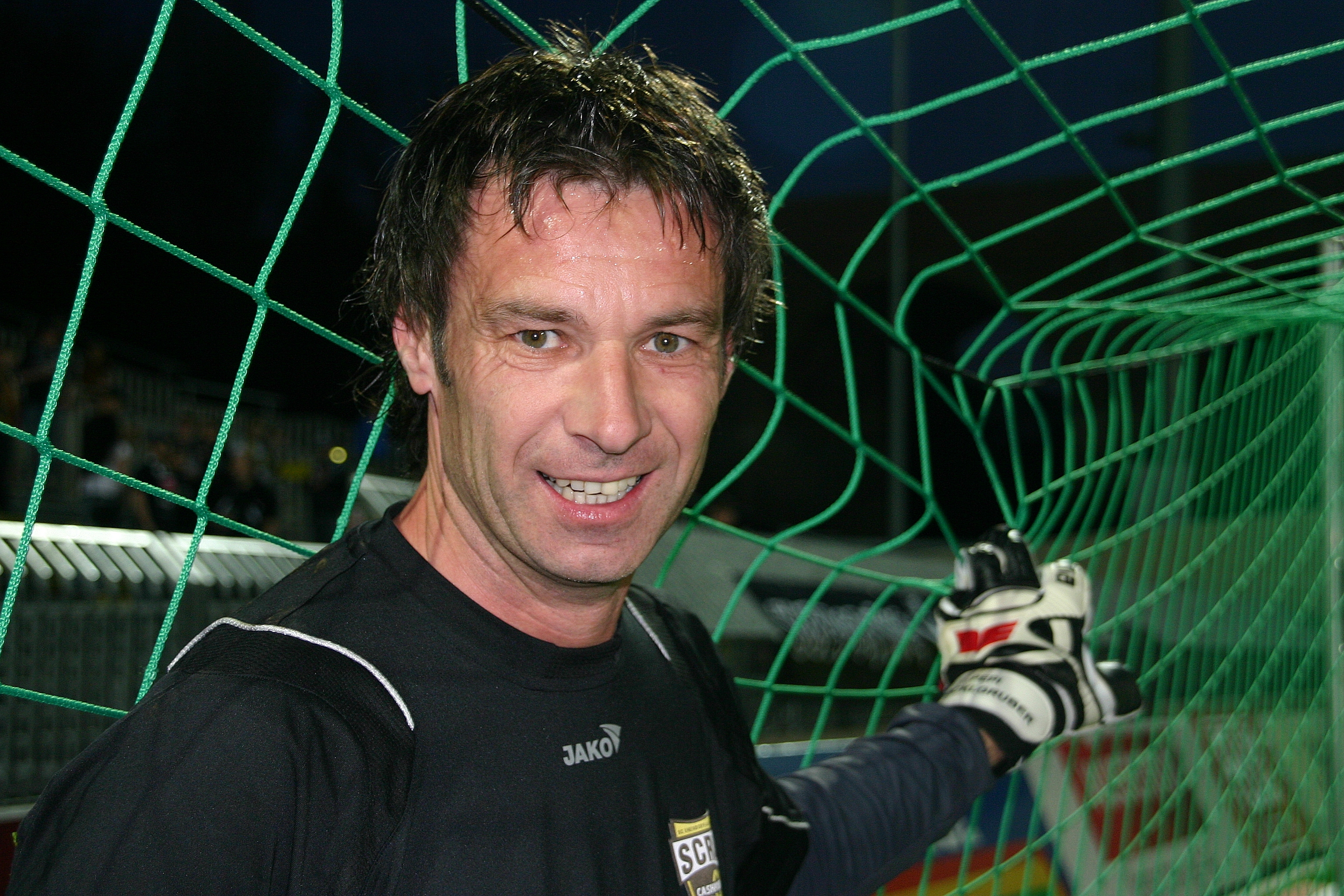

Personal information
- Date of birth: 21 July 1967 (age 59)
- Place of birth: Ansfelden, Austria
- Height: 1.87 m (6 ft 1 1/2 in)
- Position: Goalkeeper

Youth career
- Fußballakademie Linz

Senior career*
Years	Team	Apps	(Gls)
1990–1999	LASK Linz	190	(0)
1998–2001	SK Sturm Graz	51	(0)
2001–2007	ASKÖ Pasching	203	(0)
2007–2008	SK Sturm Graz	17	(0)
2009	SC Rheindorf Altach	14	(0)
2009–2011	FC Pasching	7	(0)
Total		482	(0)
- * Club domestic league appearances and goals

Josef Schicklgruber (born 21 July 1967) is an Austrian retired footballer who last played for FC Pasching.
