= Burg Schlaining =

Castle in Austria

Coordinates: 47°19′20″N 16°16′49″E

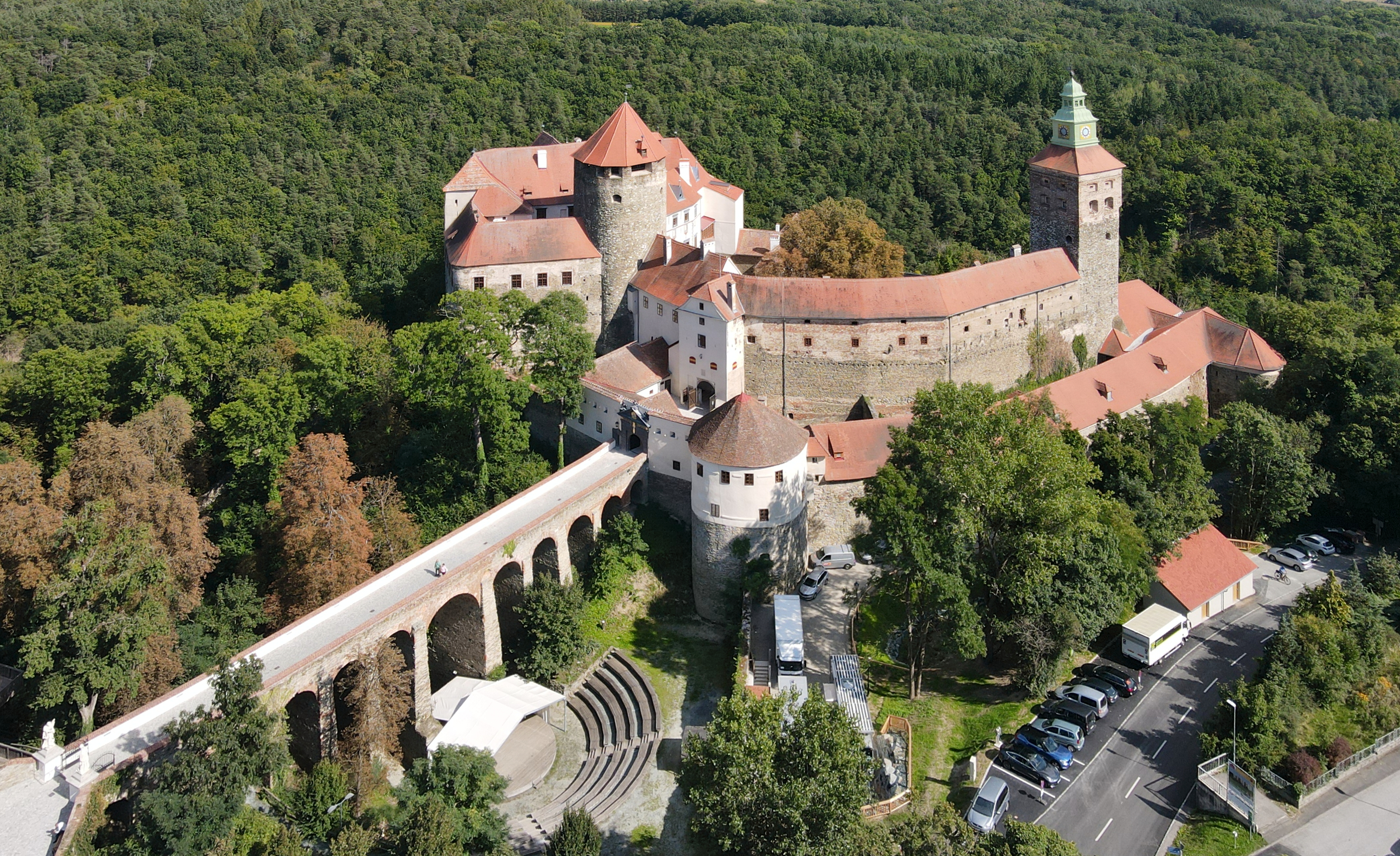
Aerial View of Burg Schlaining

Burg Schlaining is a castle in Stadtschlaining in the Austrian state of Burgenland. Burg Schlaining is 378 metres (1,240 ft) above sea level. Today, Burg Schlaining is home to the Austrian Study Centre for Peace and Conflict Resolution.

== See also ==
- List of castles in Austria
