= List of museums in Salzburg (state) =

This list of museums in the state of Salzburg (state), Austria contains museums which are defined for this context as institutions (including nonprofit organizations, government entities, and private businesses) that collect and care for objects of cultural, artistic, scientific, or historical interest and make their collections or related exhibits available for public viewing. Also included are non-profit art galleries and university art galleries.

== The list ==
Name	Image	Location	Type	Summary
1 Blick Hallein		Hallein	Art	website, art gallery
Bramberg Heritage & Mineral Museum		Bramberg am Wildkogel	Local	information, local history, culture, minerals
Burg Klammstein		Dorfgastein	Historic house	website, castle tours with exhibits on history, hunting, minerals, and the Gastein Valley trade route
Burg Mauterndorf		Mauterndorf	Historic house	Medieval castle tours with life-size figures displaying castle life
Cathedral Excavations Museum		Salzburg	Archaeology	website, excavated artifacts
Celtic Museum Hallein		Hallein	History	website, history and culture of the Celts in the area
Die Bachschmiede		Wals-Siezenheim	Local	Local history, art, culture, performing arts and cultural centre
Edelweiss-Alm Farm Museum		Wagrain	Agriculture	website, working traditional hill farm
Felberturm Museum Mittersill		Mittersill	Local	website, country arts and crafts, folk culture and heritage, minerals, sacred art, history of Alpine skiing
Fotohof		Salzburg	Photography	Center for Photography: gallery, publishing house, library, archive, workshops
Furnace Museum		Thomatal	Mining	website, restored blast furnace used for smelting
Georg Trakl Memorial Center		Salzburg	Biographical	website, birthplace and life of poet Georg Trakl
Hallein Salt Mine		Hallein	Mining	Tours of the underground salt mine
Haus der Natur		Salzburg	Natural history	website, dinosaurs, geology, animals, human body, space, Christian Doppler, an aquarium and a reptile zoo
Heimatmuseum Schloss Ritzen		Saalfelden	Multiple	website, minerals and fossils, carved nativity scenes, votive tablets, period room displays, agriculture, art exhibits
Hellbrunn Palace		Salzburg	History	Palace with trick gardens, museum of Salzburg folk culture including customs, folk piety, home living and folk medicine
Hohensalzburg Fortress		Salzburg	Historic house	Medieval fortress with military exhibits, also houses the Marionette Museum
Hohenwerfen Castle		Werfen	Historic house	Medieval fortress with historical falconry centre
Hüttschlag Valley Museum		Hüttschlag	Local	website, rural life, mining
Joseph Mohr House		Hintersee	Toy	website, collection of dolls, teddy bears, dollhouses and toys
Karl Heinrich Waggerl Museum		Wagrain	Literary	website, home of author Karl Heinrich Waggerl, features exhibit about composer Joseph Mohr
King of the Skies House		Rauris	Natural history	website, birds of prey, located in Nationalpark Hohe Tauern
Krimml Wonder World of Water		Krimml	Natural history	website, watershed of the Krimml Waterfalls
Landesskimuseum Werfenweng		Werfenweng	Sport	website, equipment, history and memorabilia of Alpine skiing
Marionette Museum		Salzburg	Puppet	website, located in Hohensalzburg Fortress, features historic puppets of the Salzburg Marionette Theatre
Michael-Haydn-Museum		Salzburg	Biographical	website, life of musician Michael Haydn
Michaelbeuern Abbey		Dorfbeuern	Religious	Abbey tours and religious art and artifacts
Mining and Gothic Museum Leogang		Leogang	Multiple	website, medieval period miner's house, minerals, late medieval religious art, tours of a show mine
Montanmuseum Altböckstein		Bad Gastein	Multiple	website, gold mining, salt, agriculture
Mozart's Birthplace		Salzburg	Biographical	website, life of composer Wolfgang Amadeus Mozart and his family
Mozart's Residence		Salzburg	Biographical	website, reconstructed 18th-century home of the family of composer Wolfgang Amadeus Mozart
Mozarthaus St. Gilgen		St. Gilgen	History	website, society and culture during the lifetime of the Mozart family
Museum am Kastenturm		Bischofshofen	Multiple	website, archaeology, sacred art, sculptures, paintings, liturgical instruments
Museum in Prince Stoeckl		Ebenau	Local	website, local history, forging tools and equipment, agriculture, hunting, forestry, defense
Museum in the Widumspfiste		Ebenau	Local	website, rural life, mining, crafts
Museum of Modern Art Salzburg		Salzburg	Art	website, two locations in Salzburg
National Park Worlds		Mittersill	Natural history	website, one of the visitor centres for Hohe Tauern National Park
Pilgrimage and Parish Museum Mariapfarr		Mariapfarr	Religious	website, ecclesiastical art and treasures of the parish church
Residenzgalerie		Salzburg	Art	Painting from the 16th to the 19th centuries
Roman Museum Wallsee-Sindelburg		Wallsee-Sindelburg	History	website, Ancient Roman artifacts and life in the area
Salzburg Baroque Museum		Salzburg	Art	website, progressive sketches and designs of monumental structures in the 17th and 18th centuries
Salzburg Cathedral		Salzburg	Historic house	17th-century baroque cathedral with collection of goldsmith works, textiles, sculptures and paintings of the Middle Ages and the Baroque
Salzburg Museum		Salzburg	Local	City history, furniture, archaeology, contemporary art exhibits, panorama of the city
Salzburg Open Air Museum		Großgmain	Open-air	website, over 100 reconstructed original buildings from agriculture, handicrafts, rural business and industry
Salzburg Residenz		Salzburg	Historic house	City palace of the Archbishops of Salzburg
Sigl House Museum		St. Georgen	Local	website
Silent Night and Heritage Museum Oberndorf		Oberndorf bei Salzburg	History	website, location of the first performance of Silent Night, history of its origin
Silent Night Museum Arnsdorf		Lamprechtshausen	Biographical	website, life of schoolteacher Franz Xaver Gruber, composer of Silent Night
Silent Night Museum Hallein		Hallein	History	website, early 19th-century period home of Franz Xaver Gruber, composer of Silent Night
Silent Night Museum Mariapfarr		Mariapfarr	Biographical	website, life of composer Joseph Mohr
Spielzug Museum		Salzburg	Children's	website, toys
Stefan Zweig Centre		Salzburg	Art	website, life and work of author Stefan Zweig
Stiegl-Brauwelt		Salzburg	Beverage	website, history of beer brewing
Taurach Railway		Mauterndorf	Railway	Heritage railway
Untersberg Museum		Grödig	Mining	website, marble quarrying and its effects on area economic, social and art history
Vehicle Museum Helmut Vötter		Kaprun	Automobile	website, classic cars from the 1950s to 1970s
Water Museum		Salzburg	History	website, elevated water tank and history of the city's water supply
