= List of museums in Tyrol (state) =

This list of museums in the state of Tyrol (state), Austria contains museums which are defined for this context as institutions (including nonprofit organizations, government entities, and private businesses) that collect and care for objects of cultural, artistic, scientific, or historical interest and make their collections or related exhibits available for public viewing. Also included are non-profit art galleries and university art galleries.

== The list ==
Name	Location	Type	Summary
Aguntum	Lienz	Archaeology	Excavated Ancient Roman city and artifacts
Alpbach Museum of Farming	Alpbach	Farming	information, working farm and museum of rural life and agriculture
Alpine Club Museum	Innsbruck	Sport	History of alpinism and the natural history of the Alps
Alpinarium Galtür	Galtür	Natural history	website, formation of the Alps, climate, erosion, precipitations, avalanches including the Galtür Avalanche
Ambras Castle	Innsbruck	Multiple	Historic castle with displays of art and weapons, includes the Chamber of Art and Curiosities
Anatomical Museum of Innsbruck	Innsbruck	Medical	website, anatomical specimens including human skeletons and skulls, animal skeletons, models, part of Innsbruck Medical University
Archaeology Museum Fliess	Fliess	Archaeology	website, artifacts from the Bronze Age, Ice Age, Roman and Hallstatt cultures
Archaeology Museum Innsbruck	Innsbruck	Archaeology	website, casts, copies and original art of ancient Greece and Rome, also from the Stone Age through the Middle Ages, part of University of Innsbruck
Art Space Innsbruck	Innsbruck	Art	website, contemporary art exhibition area
Augustinian Museum Rattenberg	Rattenberg	Religious	website, former Augustinian monastery with Gothic sculptures, gold and silverware and religious folk art
aut architecture und Tirol	Innsbruck	Architecture	website, exhibits about architecture and design
Burg Freundsberg	Schwaz	Local	Local history, mining
City of Lienz Museum	Lienz	Multiple	Located in Schloss Bruck, includes art, works by painter Albin Egger-Lienz, East Tyrolean folk art, natural history
Ehrenberg Castle	Reutte	History	Life in the medieval castle
Gallery in Taxispalais	Innsbruck	Art	website, art gallery
Golden Roof	Innsbruck	History	Medieval building with a golden roof, museum about the life of Maximilian I, Holy Roman Emperor and his family
Grassmayr Bells Museum	Innsbruck	History	website, bell foundry, museum and sound room
Hall Mint Museum	Hall	Numismatic	Hasegg Castle and mint that was the birthplace of the taler and the modern day dollar
Haus der Fasnacht	Imst	Amusement	website, costumes, culture and history of the pre-Lenten carnival known as Fastnacht
Hofkirche, Innsbruck	Innsbruck	Religious	16th-century Gothic church with tomb of Maximilian I, Holy Roman Emperor
Kitzbühel Museum – Alfons Walde Collection	Kitzbühel	Art	website
Kufstein Fortress	Kufstein	Historic house	Medieval fortress, includes local history museum
Museum der Völker	Schwaz	Ethnography	Culture of rituals in Africa and Asia
Museum in den Nagelschmiedhäusern	Rattenberg	Historic house	website, handcrafted furniture and household items in a historic nailsmith house, Tyrolean art and culture
Museum in the Ballhaus	Imst	Local	website, local history, culture, art
Museum of Local History Fügen	Fügen	Local	information
Museum of Tyrolean Farms	Kramsach	Open air	About 30 historic farmsteads and other historic rural buildings
Museum of Tyrolean Folk Art	Innsbruck	Decorative art	Includes artisan craftwork, applied arts, domestic industry, popular piety, masks, and traditional costumes
Museum St. Anton am Arlberg	St. Anton am Arlberg	Local	website, information, history of area skiing inside a restaurant
Museum Wattens	Wattens	Local	website, history of Swarovski, local paper industry, archaeological excavations of Prehistory and Classical antiquity in Volders, Wattens and Fritzens
National Park House in Matrei	Matrei in Osttirol	Natural history	One of the visitor centres for Hohe Tauern National Park
Ötztal Heritage Museum	Längenfeld	Open air	website, rural life buildings, local history
Radio Museum Innsbruck	Innsbruck	Technology	website, radios, telecommunications equipment
Schloss Anras	Anras	Local	website, medieval castle with exhibits of local history, art, culture, natural history
Schloss Landeck	Landeck	Multiple	website, local history, culture, art gallery
Schuh Paradies Shoe Museum	Imst	Fashion	website, shoes and shoe making
Schwaz Silver Mine	Schwaz	Mining	website, underground silver mine
Stift Wilten	Innsbruck	Religious	website, tours of the baroque monastery, abbey museum with ecclesiastical treasures
Swarovski Crystal Worlds	Wattens	Art	Art creations using Swarovski crystals
Tower Museum Oetz	Oetz	Art	website, alpine landscape paintings, religious art, period rooms
Tratzberg Castle	Jenbach	Historic house	Audio guided tours of the 16th-century castle
Tyrolean Bee World	Söll	Natural history	website, bee farm with museum about bees and beekeeping
Tyrolean Localbahn Museum	Innsbruck	Railway	
Tyrolean Panorama	Innsbruck	Multiple	website, painting of major stages of Tyrolean history, history of the Tyrolean culture, includes the Kaiserjäger Museum about the local infantry, website
Tyrolean State Museum	Innsbruck	Multiple	Local history, art, archaeology, natural history, crafts, musical instruments
Werner Berg Museum	Bleiburg	Art	website, features work by Werner Berg
Zeughaus	Innsbruck	Local	Tyrolean cultural history in the historic armory
