= DP Camp Haid =

Coordinates: 48°12′14″N 14°15′14″E

The DP camp Haid, officially Wohnsiedlung 121 Haid, was a camp for displaced persons, first under American administration, then Upper Austrian administration. It was located in the district of Haid, Ansfelden in Upper Austria. Displaced persons were civilians who were affected by the turmoil of World War II, first with unknown residence.

After the Second World War Ansfelden belonged to the American occupation zone. The camp was set up by the American military administration at the existing labor camp of the Wehrmacht from 1945. In September the same year between 8,000 and 9,000 captured SS men were guarded by American soldiers in the camp, who had to continue efforts to expand. In the following years, the camp was populated with displaced Jews from Poland and the homeless from Yugoslavia, Romania, Hungary, Germany, Czechoslovakia and Transylvania, Sudeten Germans and Croats. In October 1956, when in Hungary the uprising against Communist rule was crushed by Russian armored troops, some 700 refugees arrived in the last stocks of the camp.

== Location ==
The camp was located on the present territory of the district Haid and was about half a square kilometer in size. Around 100 properties were in it, most built from wood (barracks), a few were built of stone – primarily for the management and commercial purposes. The barracks were about 270 m² in size and consisted mostly of one room.

== Camp administration ==
In 1946 the camp administration under subordination of the Upper Austrian government took over the administration of the camp. Emil Lispky was the head of citizens from 1947 to 1964. He was assisted by officers, warehouse workers, employees and the Siedlungsrat. In 1949, the camp was occupied by 4.661 persons, 1.243 were fully occupied, 3.407 people got social welfare. From February to June 1957 the camp was administered by the League of Red Cross Societies.

== Social situation in the camp ==
The people in the camp had different former professions. Most of them were farmers. Artisans and entrepreneurs and members of the clerical occupations were among them. The job-seeking expellees were initially provided only in agriculture and later in the construction industry and much later in the industry. Lots of the camp residents escaped the death camps in their home countries and arrived sick and broken in Austria. Due to the economic situation even the best-qualified people would have small chances for permanent employment, so that many migrated to other countries. The mass of old and sick people and those who could build up an existence remained. For medical care two doctors and three nurses were situated in the camp.

== Commercial and business ==
In 1954 there were many shops in the camp: food, milk, meat, textiles and haberdashery, tailoring, hairdressing and photographer. Many of the inhabitants were into self-sufficiency with pigs, cows and small animals. In January 1949 a music school was opened.

== Closure of the camp ==
In 1953, the LAWOG was founded, whose aim was to eliminate the barrack misery. The local council of Ansfelden decided to become a member of the cooperative. The year 1956 marked the implementation of first housing projects, Haid transformed into one of the largest construction sites in Austria. Step by step, the barracks were torn down and rows of apartment blocks were built up.

== Literature and References ==
- Josef Fuchshuber: Ansfelden einst und jetzt. Teil 2. Published by Stadtgemeinde Ansfelden, 1988.
- Maria Weiss: D.P. Siedlung 121 Haid 1941 bis 1961. Historisch-biographische Fotodokumentation. Published by Stadtamt Ansfelden, 2004.
- Information des OÖ Landesarchives
