= Ansfelden =

- Municipality
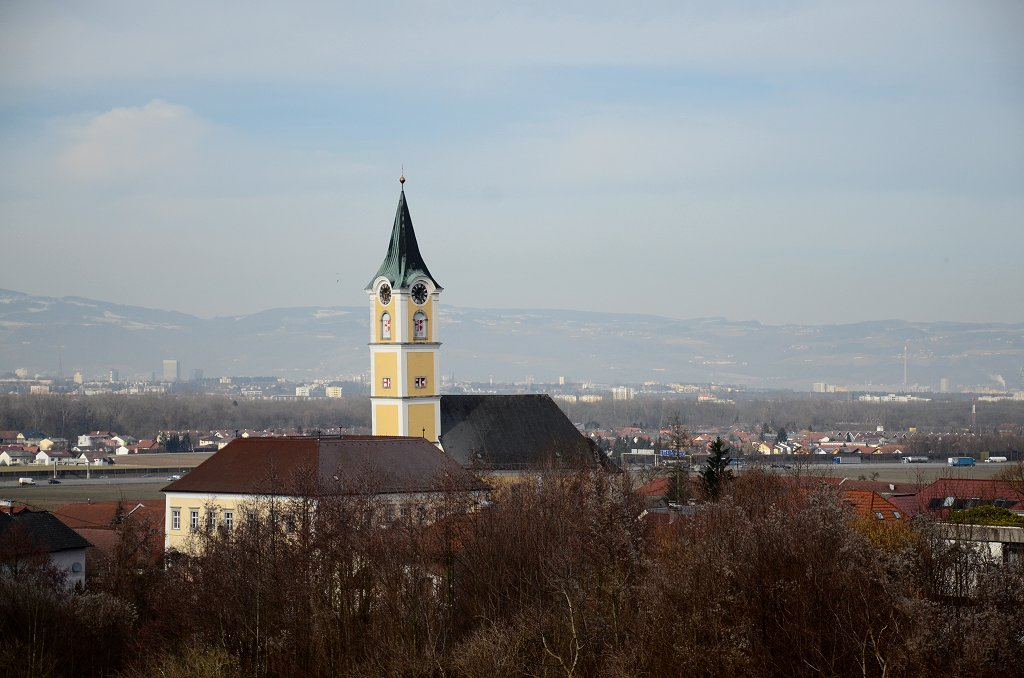

- Coat of arms

- Location within Austria
- Coordinates: 48°12′30″N 14°17′20″E
- Country: Austria
- State: Upper Austria
- District: Linz-Land

Government
  - Mayor: Christian Partoll (FPÖ)

Area
  - Total: 31.35 km^{2} (12.10 sq mi)
- Elevation: 289 m (948 ft)

Population (2024-01-01)
  - Total: 18,251
  - Density: 582.2/km^{2} (1,508/sq mi)
- Time zone: UTC+1 (CET)
  - Summer (DST): UTC+2 (CEST)
- Postal code: 4052 and 4053
- Area code: 07229, 07227 and 0732
- Vehicle registration: LL
- Website: www.ansfelden.at

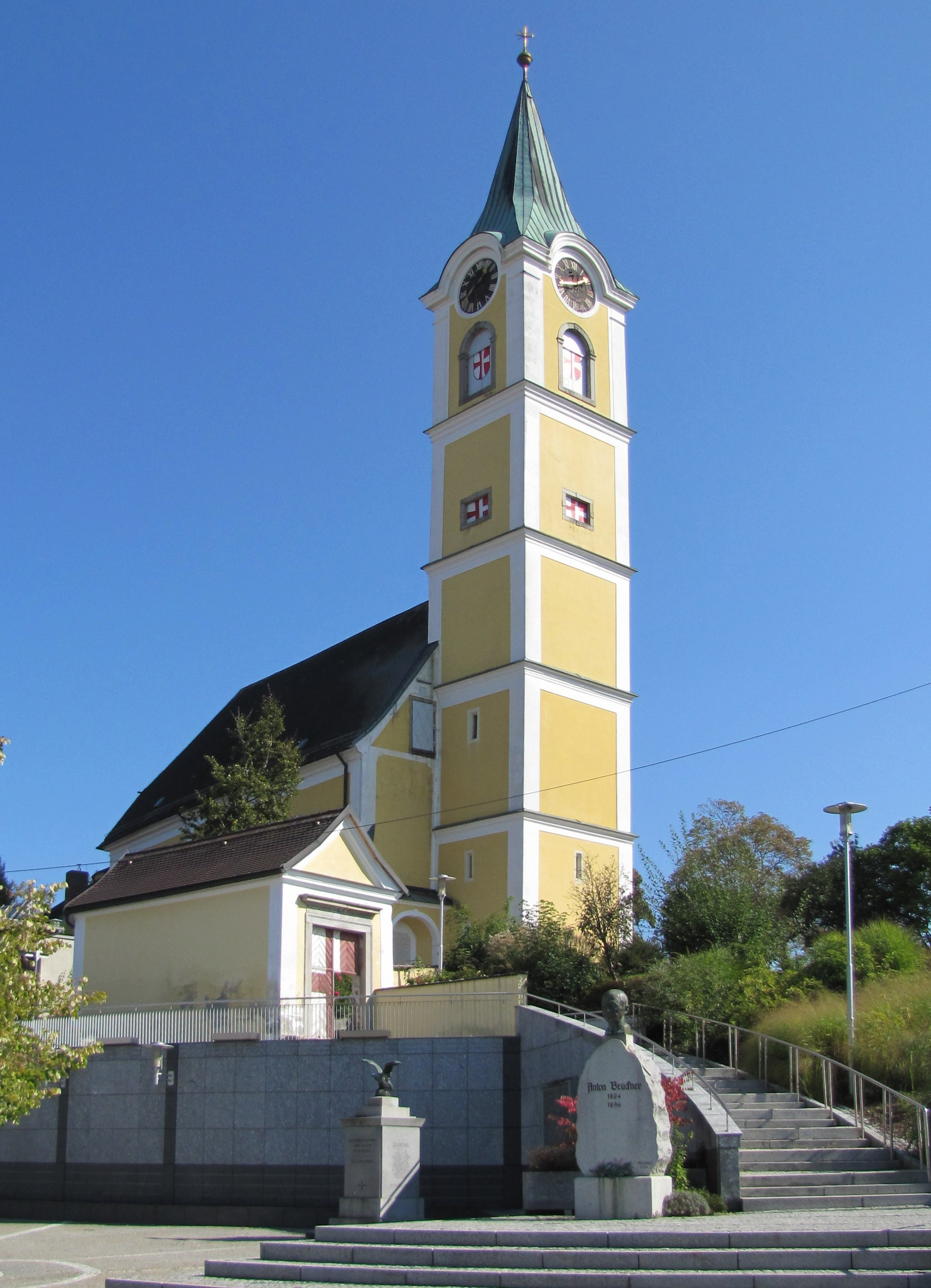
Church Ansfelden

Ansfelden is a town in the Austrian state of Upper Austria. The rivers Traun and Krems run through the municipality. The town is perhaps best known for being the birthplace of the composer and organist Anton Bruckner.

Ansfelden has two museums, the Anton Bruckner Museum and a museum of musical instruments.

In the town's coat of arms, granted on October 28, 1985, the wavy stripe represents the two rivers, the organ pipes the organist and composer Bruckner, and the cog-wheel the town's paper-mills and other older industries.

Between 1945 and 1964, the DP Camp Haid was located in the district Haid. The city is twinned with the city of Condega in Nicaragua.

== Population ==
Historical population
Year	Pop.	±%
1869	2,280	—
1880	2,491	+9.3%
1890	2,485	−0.2%
1900	2,720	+9.5%
1910	2,780	+2.2%
1923	3,056	+9.9%
1934	3,324	+8.8%
1939	3,646	+9.7%
1951	8,879	+143.5%
1961	7,941	−10.6%
1971	11,074	+39.5%
1981	13,324	+20.3%
1991	14,636	+9.8%
2001	14,789	+1.0%
2011	15,673	+6.0%

Largest groups of foreign residents
Nationality	Population (2025)
Romania	1088
Bosnia and Herzegovina	776
Croatia	573
Turkey	557
Hungary	275
Germany	234
Syria	144
Serbia	133
Slovenia	112
Slovakia	110
Bulgaria	89
Czech Republic	52
Iraq	51
Italy	44
Ukraine	42
Poland	33

== Local council (Gemeinderat) ==
Seats in the council, Elections 2015:

- FPÖ 15
- SPÖ 15
- ÖVP 5
- The Greens 2
- Total 37

== Sons and daughters of the city ==
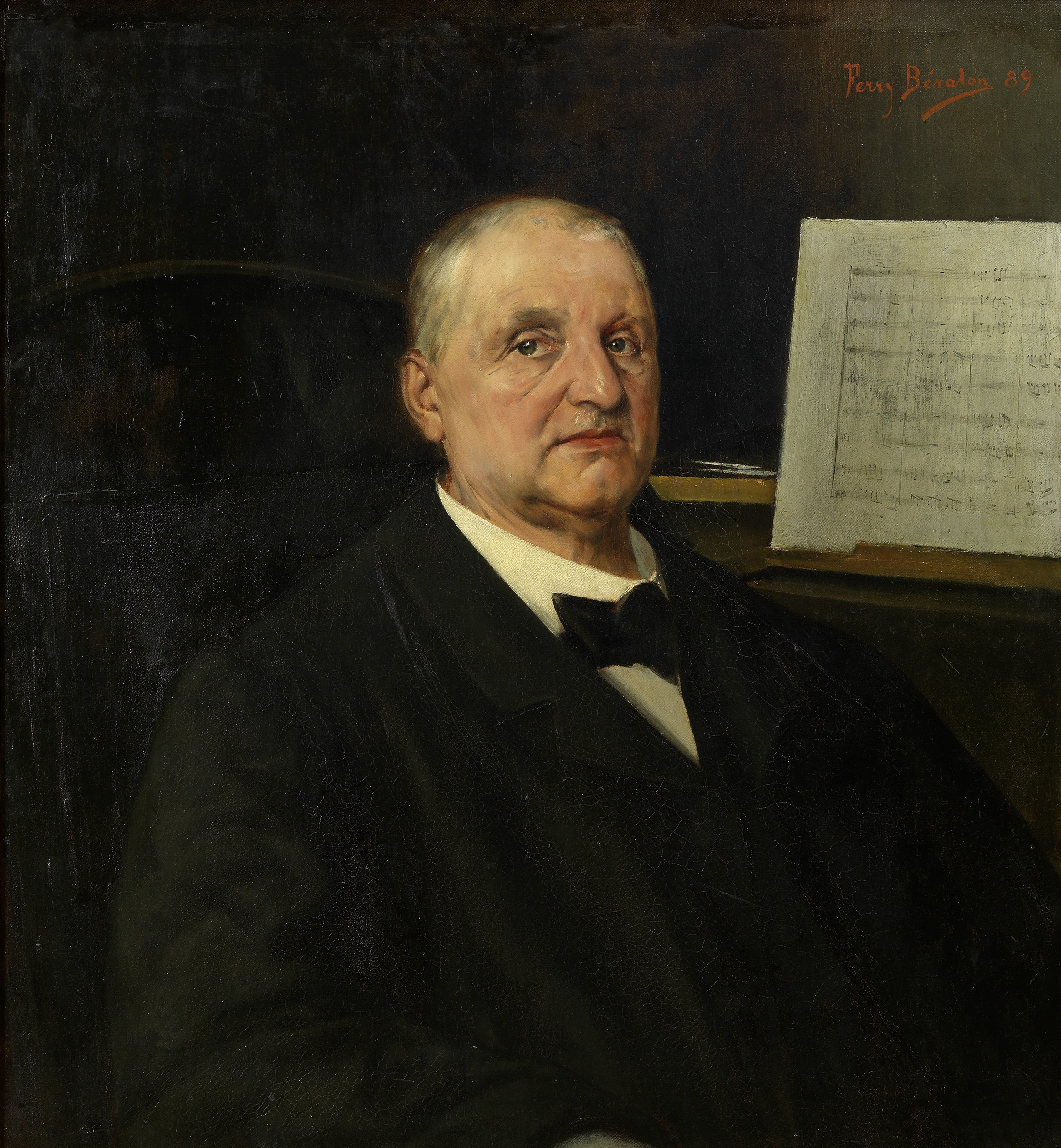
Anton Bruckner 1889

- Anton Bruckner (1824–1896), composer, organist and teacher of music theory and pipe organ performance
- Walter Wimmer (1919–2003), politician (SPÖ) and member of parliament
- Hermann Aichmair (born 1924), university professor, author, painter and sculptor
- Hermann Krist (born 1959), politician (SPÖ) and member of parliament
- Josef Schicklgruber (1967), football player (goalkeeper).

== People with relationship to the city ==
- Bernhard Sallmann (born 1967), German filmmaker; grew up in Ansfelden
- Werner Gruber (born 1970), neurophysicist and author; grew up in Ansfelden
