= Museum of Tyrolean Farms =

Open-air museum in Kramsach, Austria

Coordinates: 47.4636°N 11.9186°E

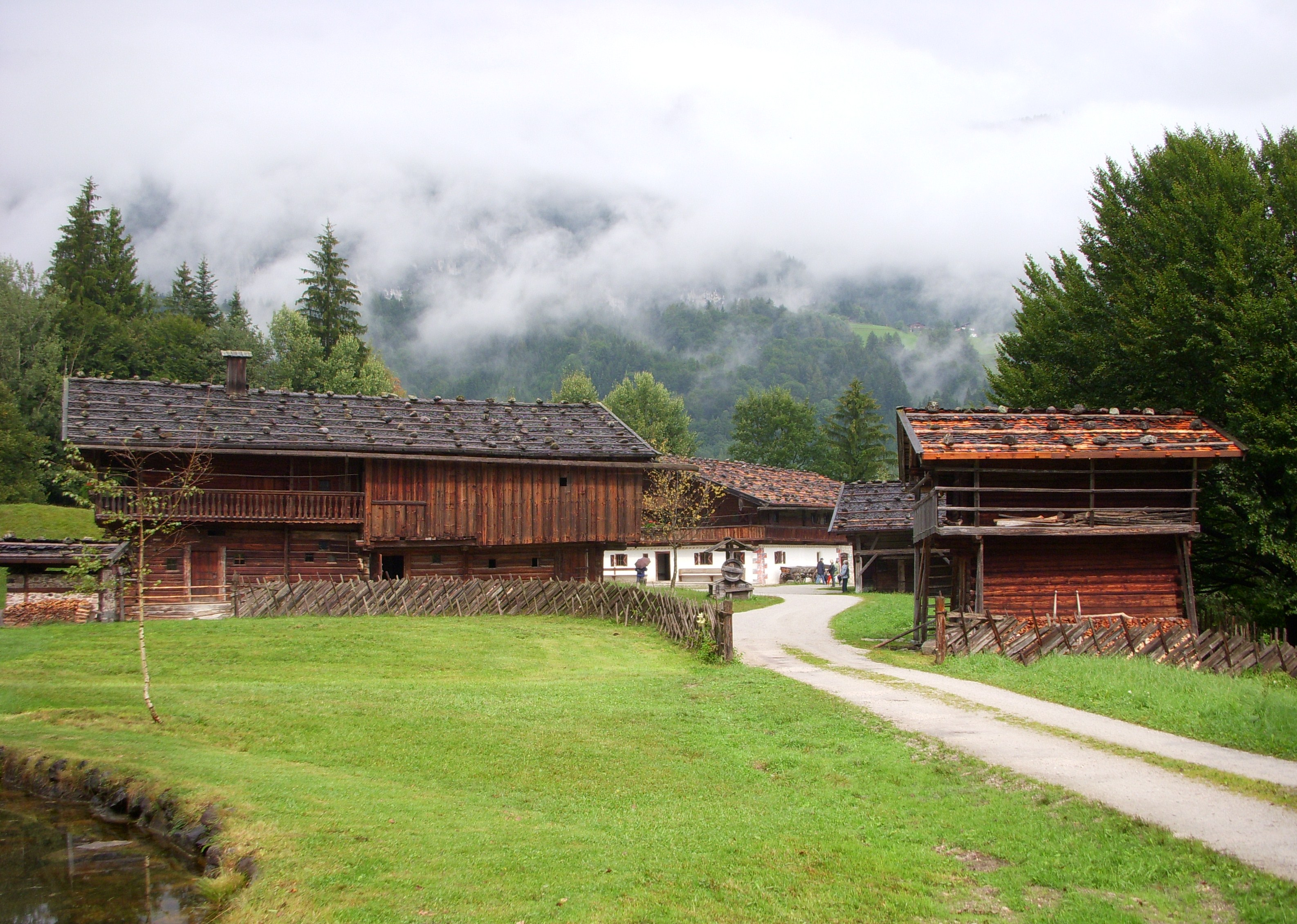
The museum terrain

The Museum of Tyrolean Farms (German: Museum Tiroler Bauernhöfe) is an open-air museum in Kramsach, Austria. As at 2009 the museum had around 30 historic farmsteads and other historic rural buildings as well as their associated barns, sheds, alms and storehouses.

== History ==
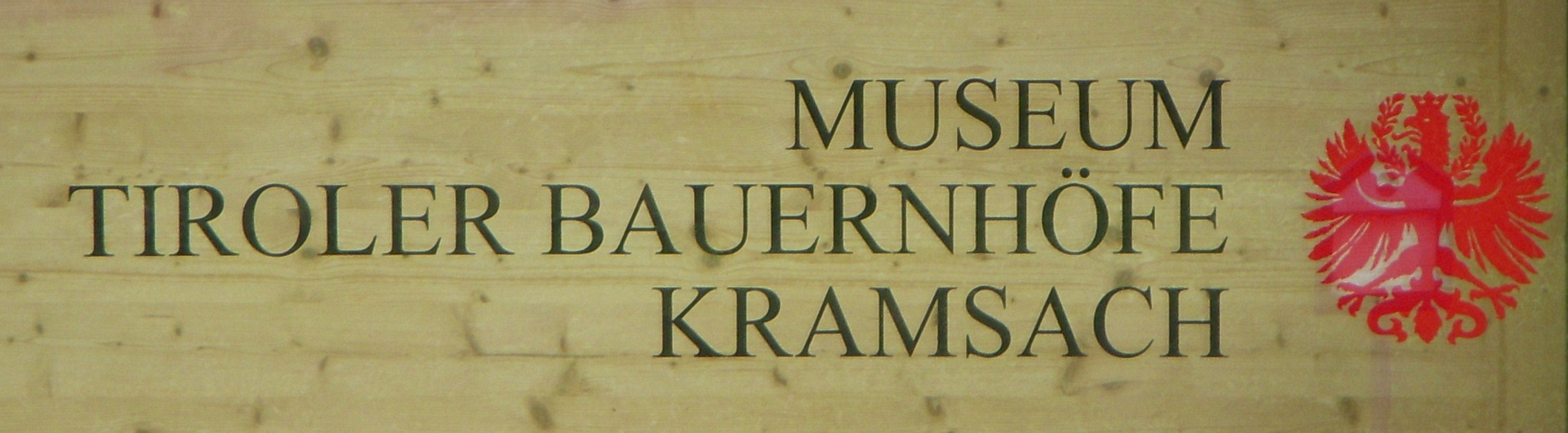

In 1974 the Museum of Tyrolean Farms Society was founded with the aim of transporting farmhouses typical of North, South and East Tyrol, together with all their buildings and equipment, to a site of about 8 hectares (20 acres) and rebuilding them there. The prototype was open-air museums in Scandinavia, for example the Skansen in Stockholm founded in 1891. Initially the number of farmhouses was 14; when the museum is full there will be 50 individual museum displays.

== The museum and its purpose ==
The museum farms are arranged along a valley that broadly represents the geographical situation of Tyrol. The farms are open and accessible and some of them are historically furnished and equipped. In each farm there is a detailed description of its construction, age and original location. As well as farms, the museum also has a school, a shooting range, a watermill, a smithy, a fire station and a public baths. The oldest farms are the Tierstaller from South Tyrol, a farmhouse with a Paarhof layout from before 1500 and the Alter Segger from East Tyrol with roots going back to the Middle Ages around 1400.

The museum carries out research, education and building conservation. Visiting schoolchildren are given a vivid insight into the agricultural history of the Tyrol.

== Gallery ==
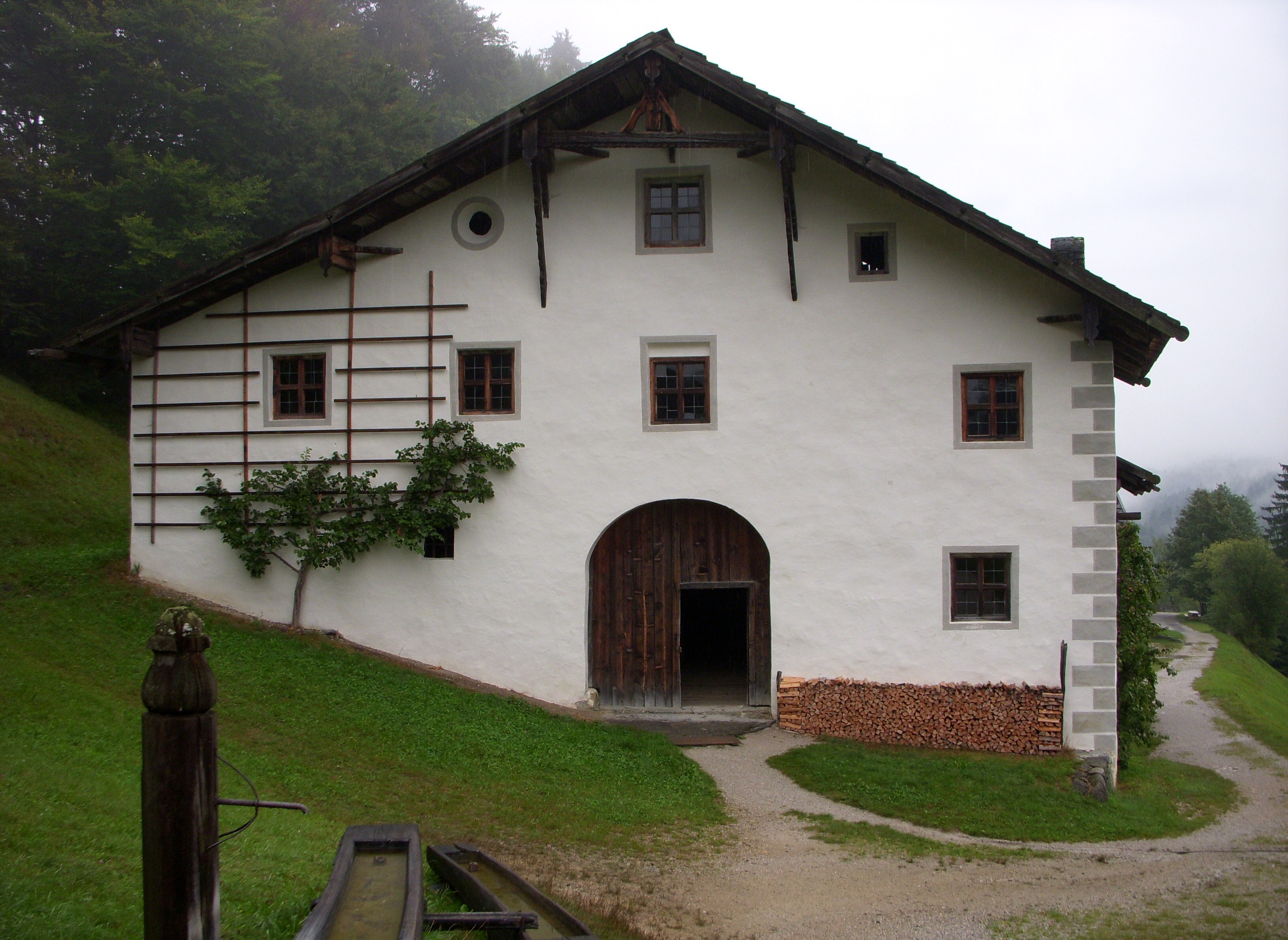
Trujer Gregörler farmhouse

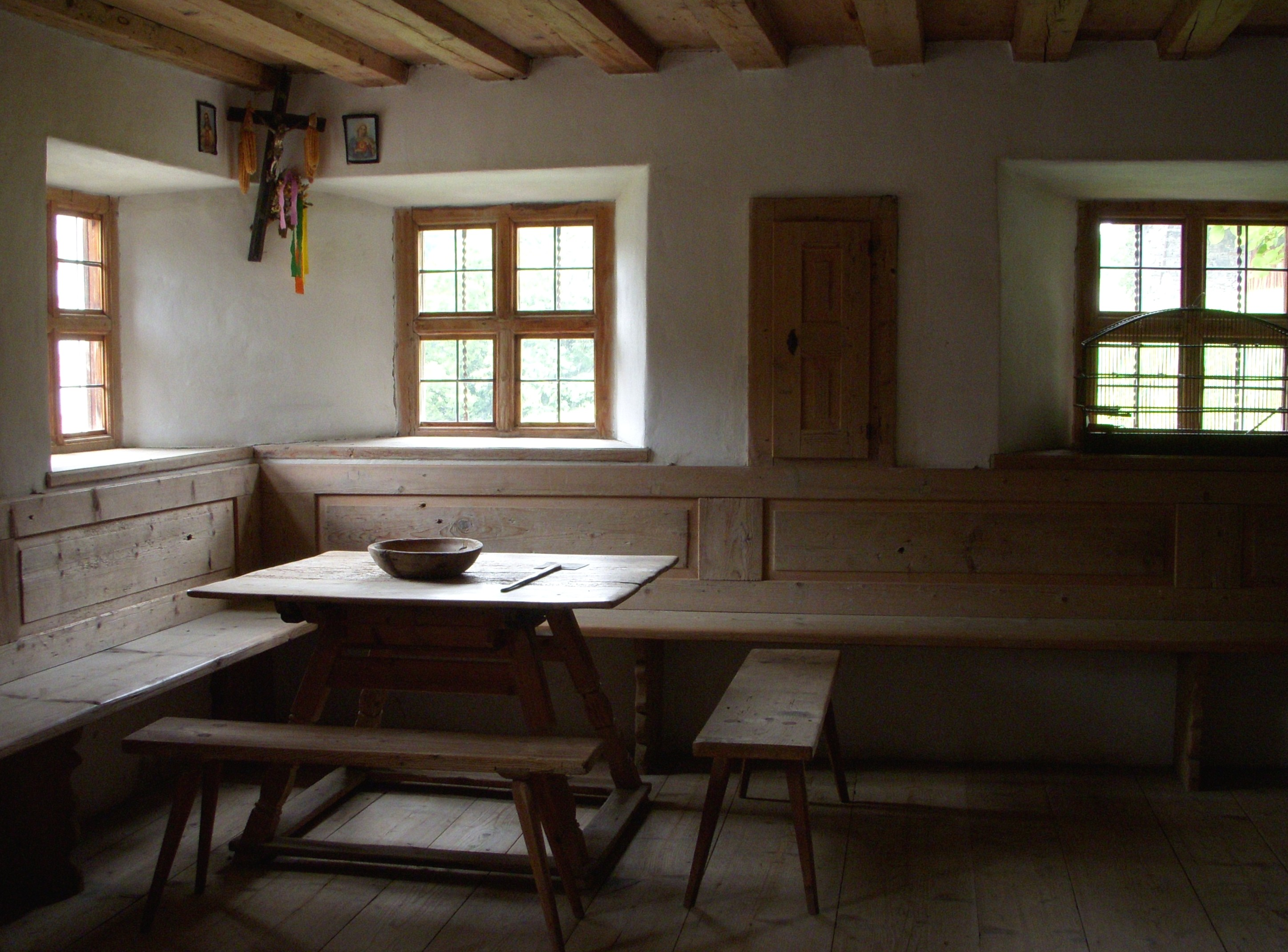
Trujer Gregörler farmhouse

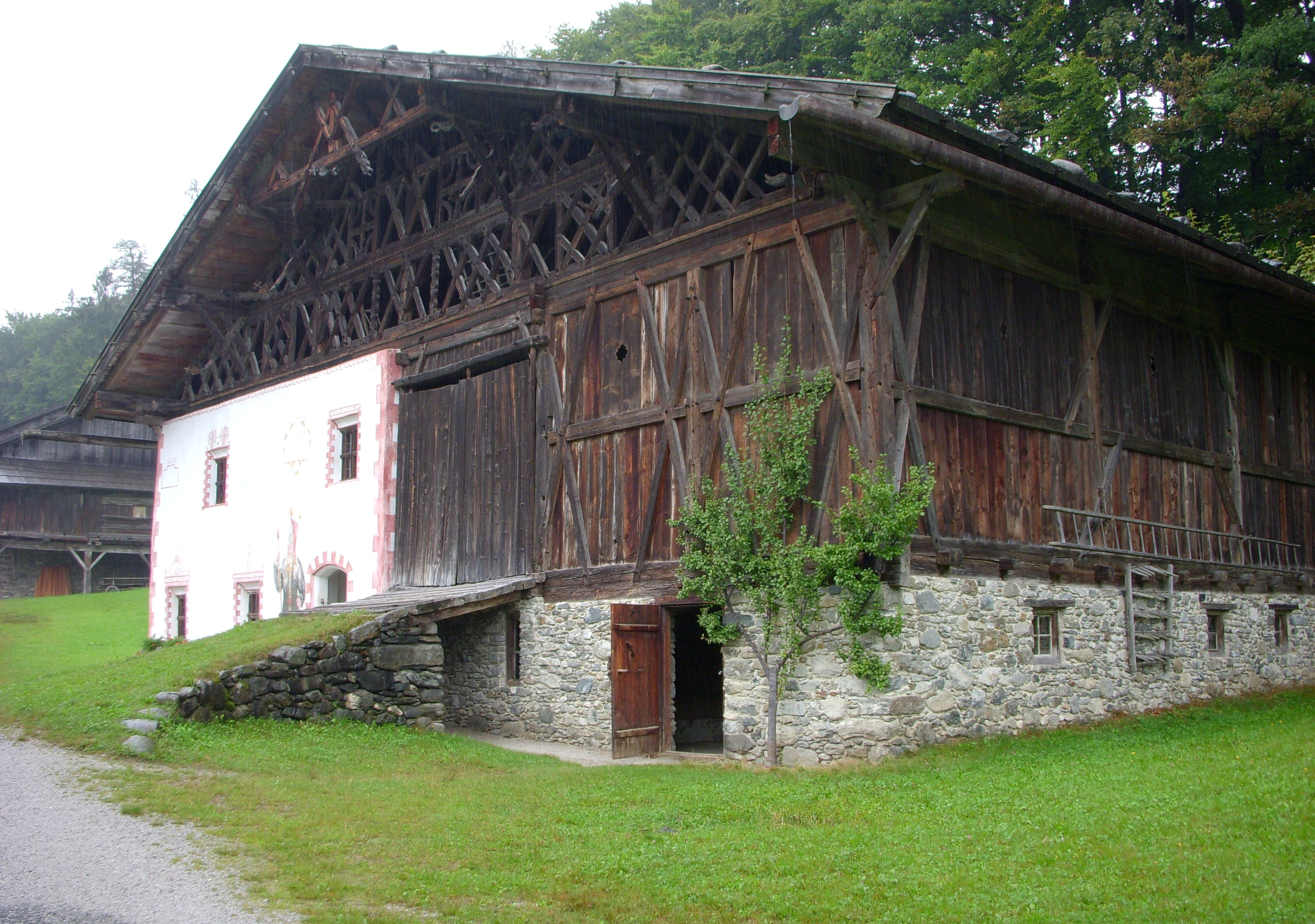
Falkner Schnaitter farmhouse

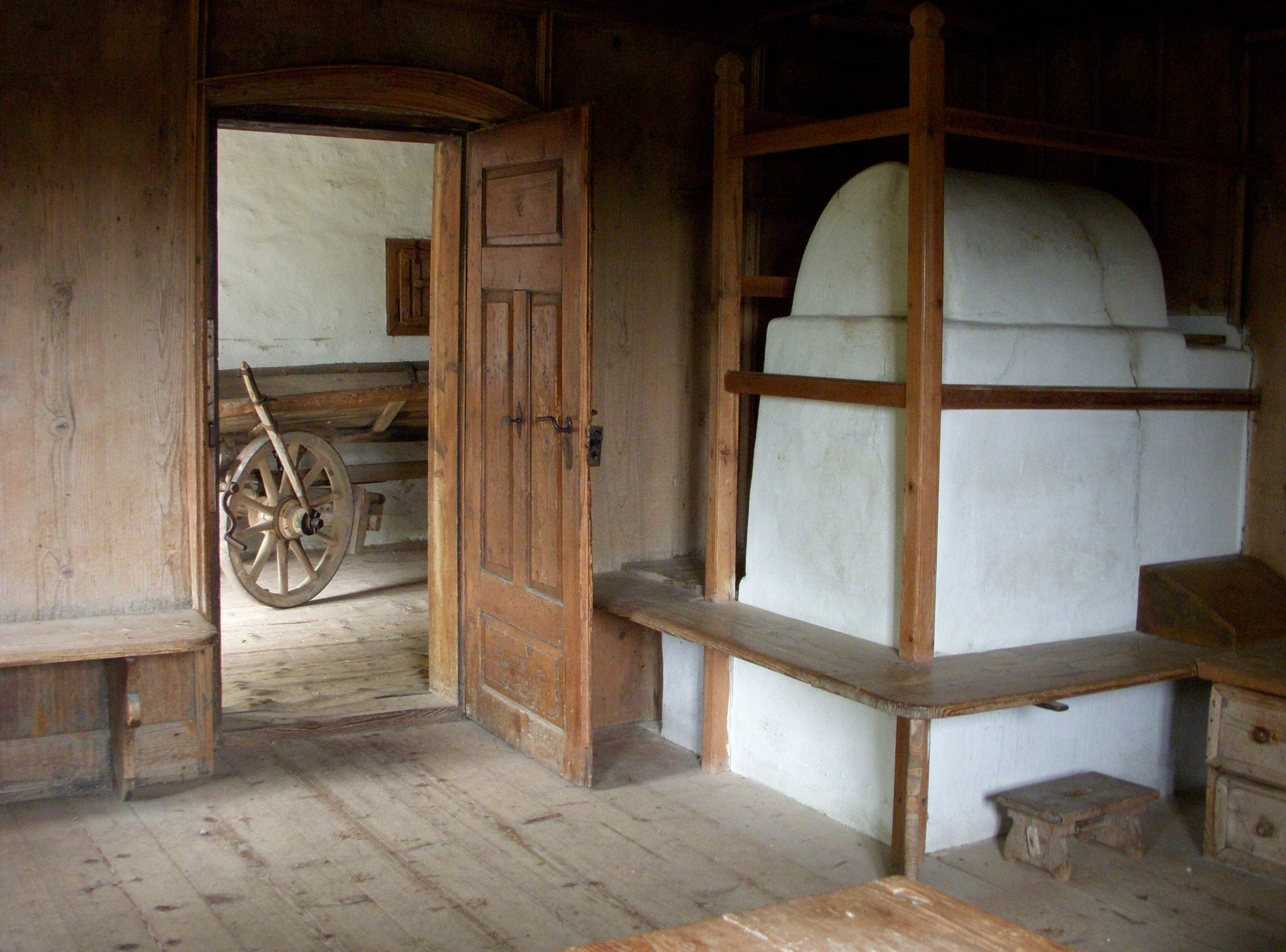
Falkner Schnaitter farmhouse

== Examples of farms displayed ==
- Hörl-Wetscher, Walchsee, Kufstein District (1577)
- Hackler, Alpbach, Kufstein District (1675)
- Gwiggen, Wildschönau, Kufstein District (1569)
- Schrofenaste, Zillertal, Schwaz District (1803)
- Franzl’s Klaisla’s, Ötztal, Imst District (1585)
- Zenzl, Pitztal, Imst District (1716)
- Burgas-Wechner, Lech valley, Reutte District (16. Jh.)
- Trujer-Gregörler, Fließ, Landeck District (1550/1646)
- Falkner-Schnaitter, Hatting, Innsbruck Land (17th-18th century)

== Sources ==
- Brochures issued by the Museum Tiroler Bauernhöfe.
