= Die Bachschmiede =

Coordinates: 47°47′27″N 12°57′51″E

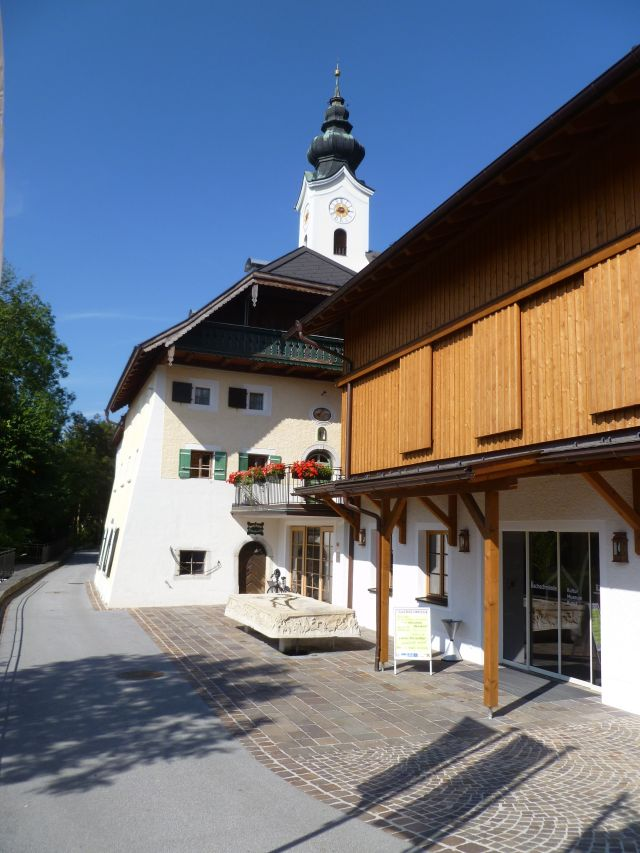
Bachschmiede in Wals

Die Bachschmiede is the cultural center of the Austrian community Wals-Siezenheim. It was opened in 2008.

== History ==
The history of the Bachschmiede can be traced back to the year 1567. At that time Georg Markhner built below the rock where the church of Wals-Siezenheim is situated, the Bachschmied-house at the River Mühlbach. In 1985 there was the thought about the revitalization of the building. Source of this idea was Sepp Forcher. Initially planned as a museum, it could then be opened in 2008 as a museum and cultural center.

On the place in front of the Bachschmiede the time stone can be seen. This is a four-time two meters high and eleven-ton stone out of the Untersberger marble. In his history of the community Wals shown in pictures. The artistic stone carvings were done by students of the vocational school in Walserfeld on a design by Franz Hirnsperger; each Student has signed its relief with its stone marks.

== Cultural opportunities ==
The museum's centerpiece is the beautifully restored forge of the former Bachschmied family Reischl, which is now a show-forge. In the former horseshoe chamber you will find the complete set of horseshoes Ebner family from Loig. Space on the first floor provide insight into the lifestyle of the 19th century and remember specifically to the Bachschmiede son Jakob Lechner, a former professor at the Vienna Military Veterinary Institute.

In the grown culture house is a museum that is dedicated primarily to the Salzburg-Bavaria topics. A first exhibition was referring 2008 to 1809 - Napoleon's army before Salzburg (Fourth Napoleonic War), a current exhibition is dedicated to the coinage of the past 2000 years (from the Roman denarius for Euro - 2000 Year money in Salzburg and neighboring Bavaria), the next exhibition comes to Sacred folk Art from the surrounding region.

As the permanent exhibition The Roman Villa Rustica is presented in Loig in the museum, a Roman country house, which was discovered in 1815 in the village of Loig. Particularly impressive here is the copy of Theseus Mosaic. The originals of the mosaics found, the stocks of the Kunsthistorisches Museum in Vienna.

Also located in the museum collection of antique toys, which goes back to the collecting activities of Karin Gugg. The changing exhibited historical and contemporary toys provide insight into the cultural history of toys and toy industry in the growing of the 19th and the 20th century.

In an art gallery (foyer of the event location) are regular exhibitions of different artists presented (including Robert Roubin, Ute Födermayr, Käthe Perner).

The variable design Sepp Forcher Hall is the place of theater performances, lectures, cabaret performances (including Martina Schwarzmann, Vince Ebert, Kernölamazonen, Monika Gruber), the International Walser film festivals and concert events.
