= Friesach =

- Municipality
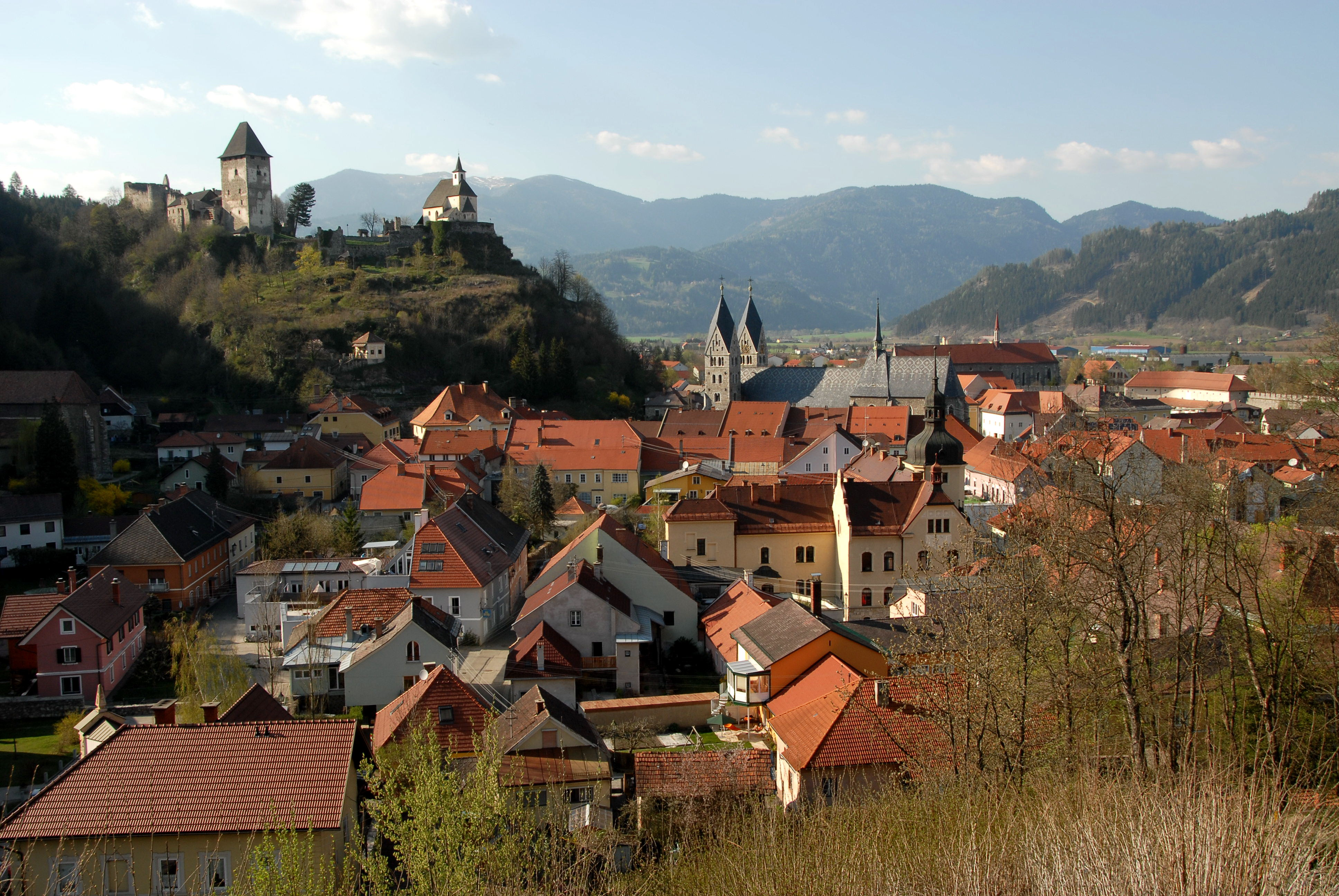
- Friesach with Petersberg Castle

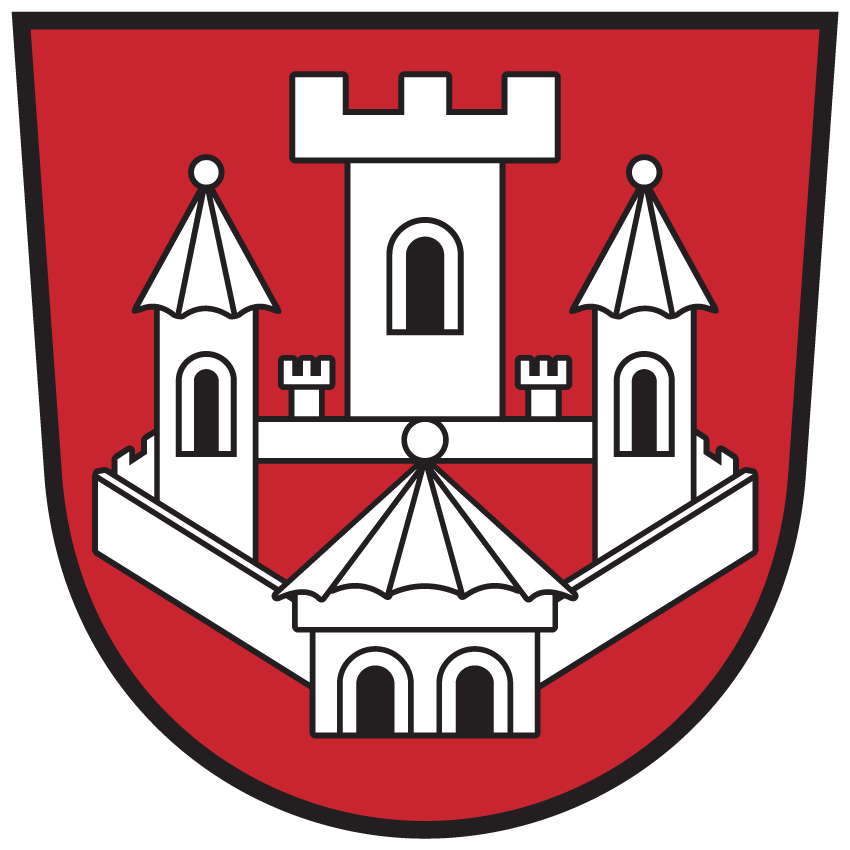
- Coat of arms

- Location within Austria
- Coordinates: 46°57′N 14°25′E
- Country: Austria
- State: Carinthia
- District: Sankt Veit an der Glan

Government
  - Mayor: Josef Kronlechner (SPÖ)

Area
  - Total: 120.81 km^{2} (46.65 sq mi)
- Elevation: 634 m (2,080 ft)

Population (2018-01-01)
  - Total: 4,947
  - Density: 40.95/km^{2} (106.1/sq mi)
- Time zone: UTC+1 (CET)
  - Summer (DST): UTC+2 (CEST)
- Postal code: 9360
- Area code: 04268
- Website: www.friesach.at

Friesach (Slovene: Breže) is a historic town in the Sankt Veit an der Glan district of Carinthia, Austria. First mentioned in an 860 deed, it is known as the oldest town in Carinthia.

== Geography ==
=== Location ===
Friesach covers an area of 120.83 km^{2} and its mean elevation is 631 meters above sea level. It is located in northern Carinthia near the border with Styria, about 40 km (25 mi) north of its capital Klagenfurt.

=== Populated places ===
The municipality of Friesach consists of the following cadastral communities (or katastralgemeinden): Friesach, St. Salvator and Zeltschach; while further subdivided into 43 populated places (with population in brackets as of 1 January 2022).

- Dobritsch (13)
- Dörfl (13)
- Engelsdorf (377)
- Friesach (Breže) (1933)
- Gaisberg (77)
- Grafendorf (246)
- Guldendorf (4)
- Gundersdorf (5)
- Gunzenberg (8)
- Gwerz (51)
- Harold (18)

- Hartmannsdorf (11)
- Hundsdorf (5)
- Ingolsthal (90)
- Judendorf (66)
- Kräuping (14)
- Leimersberg (12)
- Mayerhofen (8)
- Moserwinkl (22)
- Oberdorf I (24)
- Oberdorf II (13)
- Olsa (465)

- Pabenberg (45)
- Reisenberg (25)
- Roßbach (50)
- St. Johann (124)
- St. Salvator (528)
- St. Stefan (81)
- Sattelbogen (12)
- Schratzbach (31)
- Schwall (48)
- Silbermann (19)
- Staudachhof (38)

- Stegsdorf (16)
- Timrian (13)
- Wagendorf (6)
- Wels (5)
- Wiegen (9)
- Wiesen (11)
- Zeltschach (Selče) (187)
- Zeltschachberg (19)
- Zienitzen (134)
- Zmuck (17)

== History ==
In 860, King Louis the German of East Francia donated the lands of the estate ad Friesah - derived from Slavic Breza (birch) - in the Bavarian March of Carinthia (Carantania) to Archbishop Adalwin of Salzburg. From about 740 Bavarians had crossed the Central Eastern Alps and settled among the Slavic Carantanians.

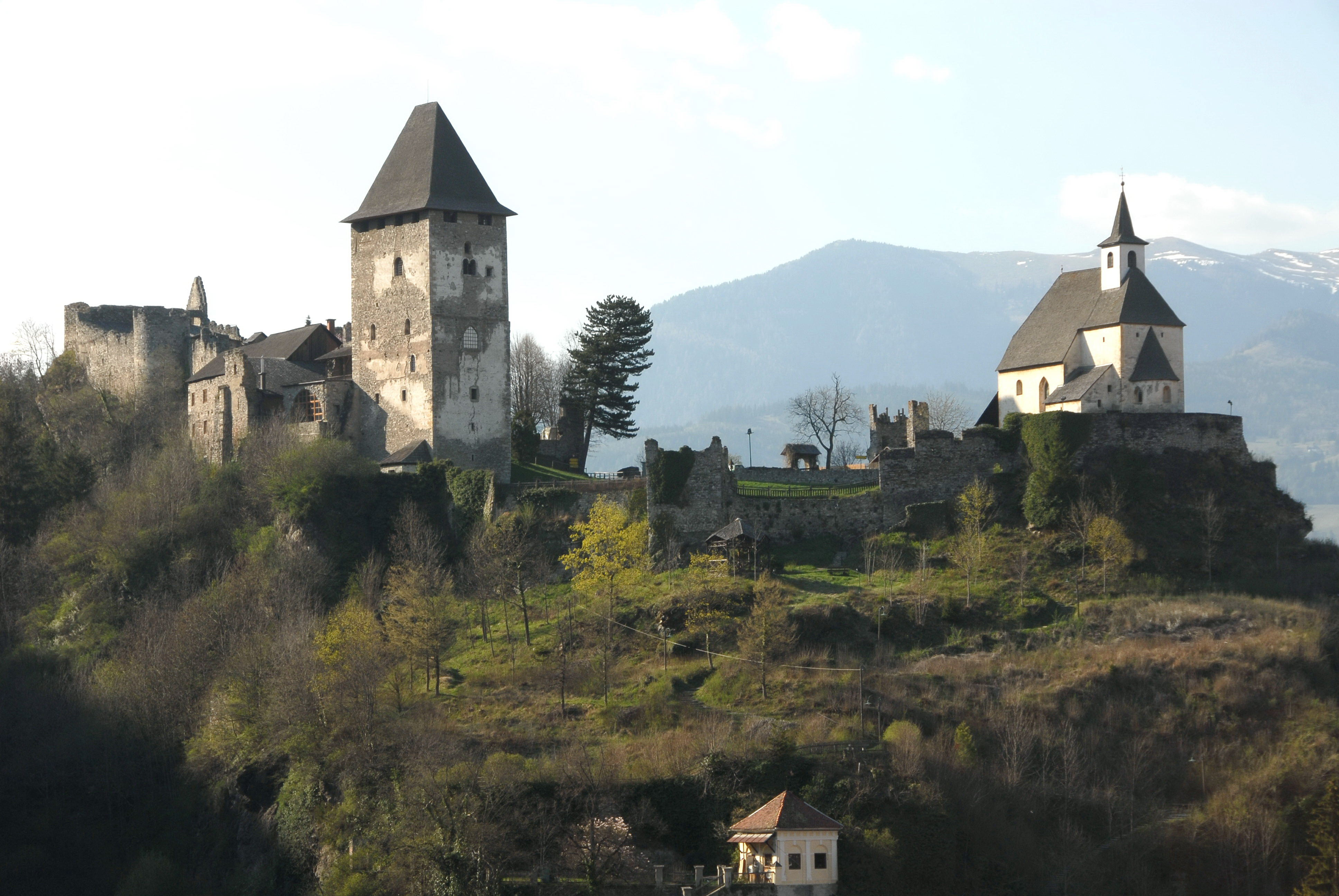
Petersberg Castle

After the formation of the Duchy of Carinthia in 976, Friesach remained a southern Salzburg exclusive and a strategically important outpost. About 1076 Archbishop Gebhard of Salzburg, a follower of Pope Gregory VII in the Investiture Controversy, had the Petersberg fortress erected above the town in order to prevent Emperor Henry IV from crossing the Alps. The archbishop also had fierce enemies in the Carinthian ducal House of Sponheim, who after his deposition made several attempts to take possession of Friesach. Constant attacks by Duke Engelbert were finally repelled in 1124. In 1149, King Conrad III of Germany stayed at the castle on his way back from the Second Crusade, as did Richard the Lionheart returning from the Third Crusade in 1192, attempting to elude the guards of Duke Leopold V of Austria.

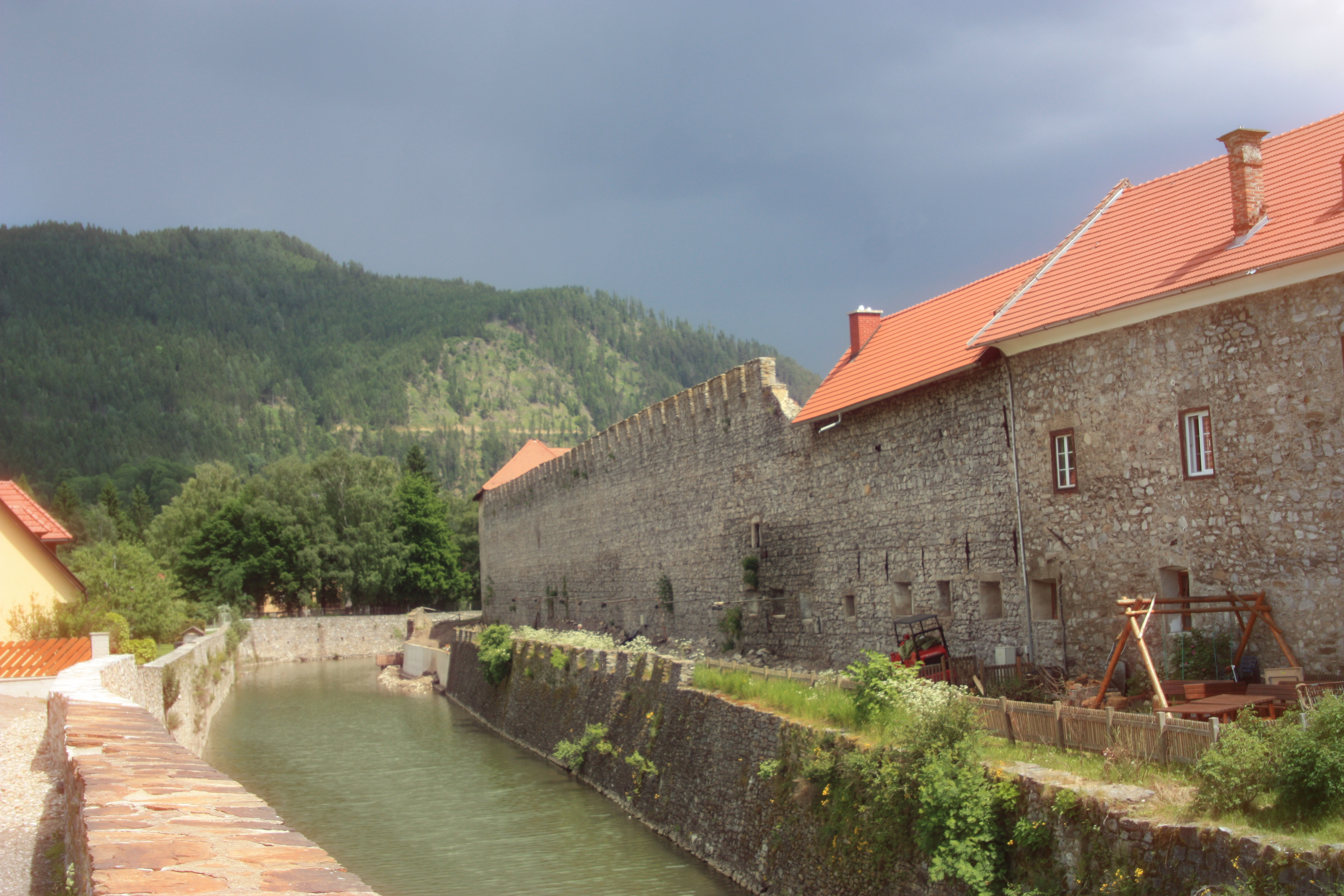
Town moat and fortification

The settlement of Friesach beneath Petersberg Castle received town privileges in 1215. During the Middle Ages, it was a principal market town and commercial centre due to an important trade route from Vienna to Venice that ran through the city. The town flourished when Archbishop Eberhard II of Regensberg (1200-1246) made it the second largest city in the Archdiocese of Salzburg and the most important town in Carinthia. From local silver resources it even minted its own currency called the Friesacher Pfennig or Frizatik, widely used within the Austrian and Hungarian lands in the 12th century. The town gained in regional importance, and by the 13th century the Friesach pfennig was the standard coin used in the eastern Alps - circulated even as far as Croatia. The importance of the town diminished with the rise of the House of Habsburg, Carinthian dukes since 1335. The fortress, however, continued to be an important power basis of the Salzburg prince-archbishops throughout the Middle Ages, once again enlarged and strengthened by Leonhard von Keutschach from 1495 onwards. It nevertheless belonged to Salzburg until the secularisation of the archbishopric in 1803, when Friesach finally fell to Carinthia.

== Demographics ==
At the 2001 census Friesach had 5,335 inhabitants. Of that, 89.8% are Roman Catholic, 2.6% are Protestant and 1.5% are Muslims. 4.8% of the population is non-religious.

== Objects of interest ==
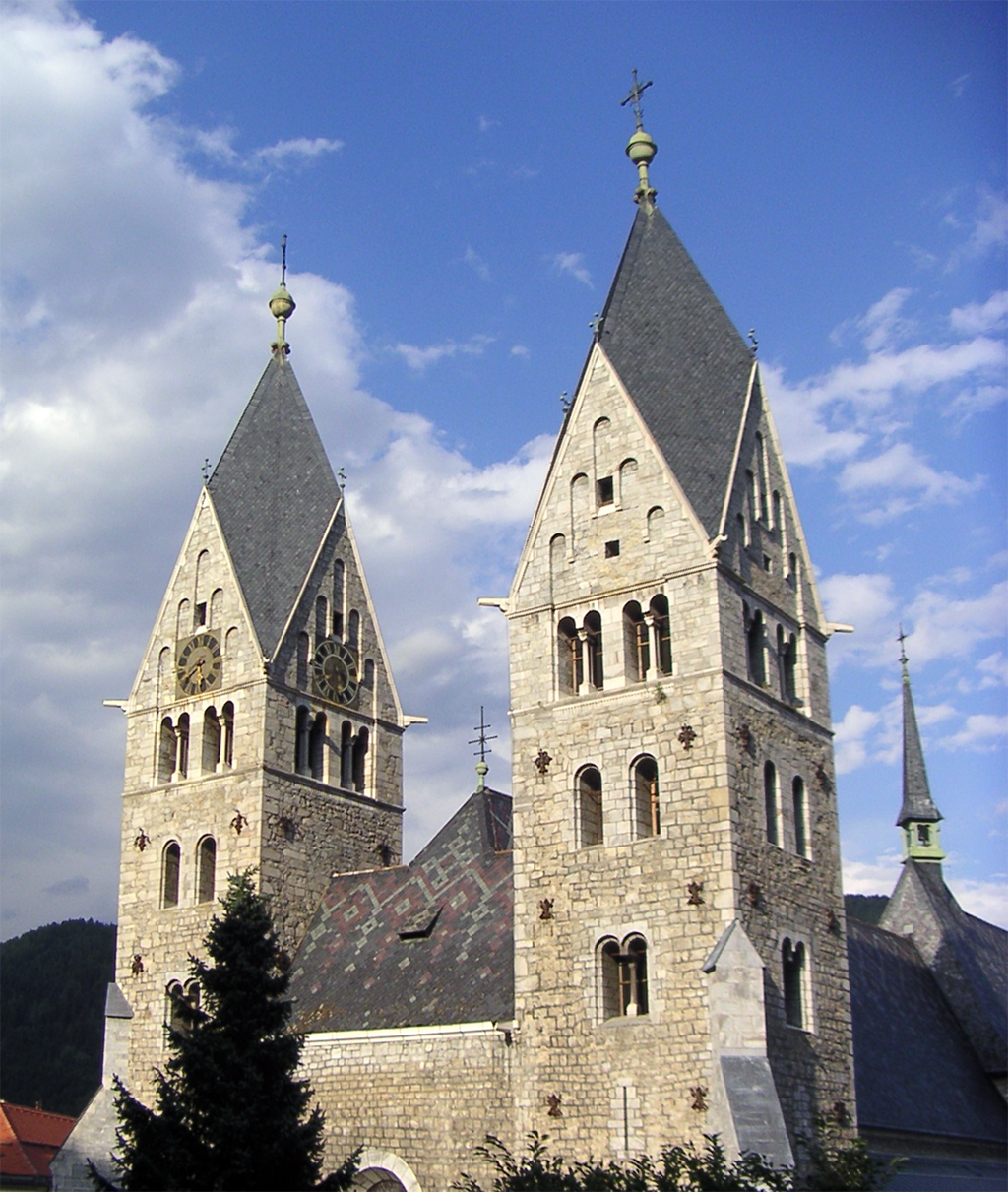
St. Bartholomew

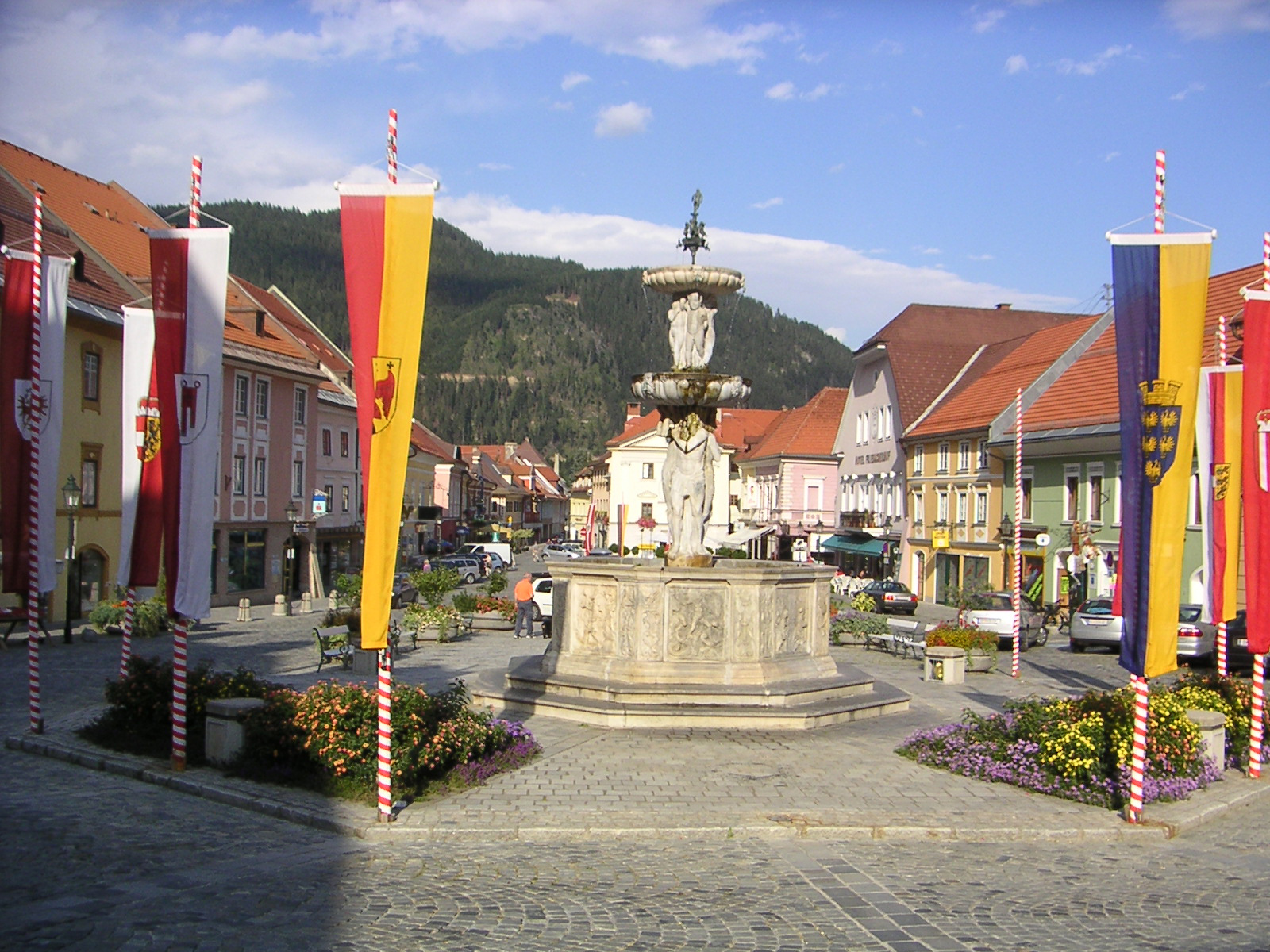
Town centre

The mediæval town around the Romanesque parish church of Saint Bartholomew and its city walls are preserved in quite good condition. From the 13th century on the Salzburg Archbishops stayed at the Fürstenhof residence. Other areas of interest include:

- Church of St. Blaise
- Dominican monastery, which contains noted medieval carvings and sculptures
- Teutonic Knights' church and hospital
- Burgruine Petersberg

== Economy ==
Friesach has several small to medium-sized industries, including metalworking and textilemaking. Like most regions of Carinthia, the town mainly depends on tourism (such as a ruined castle and a chocolate museum). With the Teutonic Order hospital, it is also a supraregional health centre.

== Sustainability ==
In 2021, the town began fulfilling much of the electricity and hot water demands by way of the largest solar farm in Austria, a nearby 5,750 square metre installation that generates 2.8 million kilowatt-hours of power per year.

== Politics ==
=== Municipal Council ===
The municipal council (Gemeinderat) consists of 23 members. Since the 2021 Carinthian local elections, it is made up of the following parties:

- Social Democratic Party of Austria (SPÖ): 12 seats
- Freedom Party of Austria (FPÖ): 5 seats
- Austrian People's Party (ÖVP): 4 seats
- Team Carinthia (TK): 2 seats

=== Twin towns ===
Friesach is twinned with:

- Cormons, Italy
- Bad Griesbach, Germany

== Notable people ==
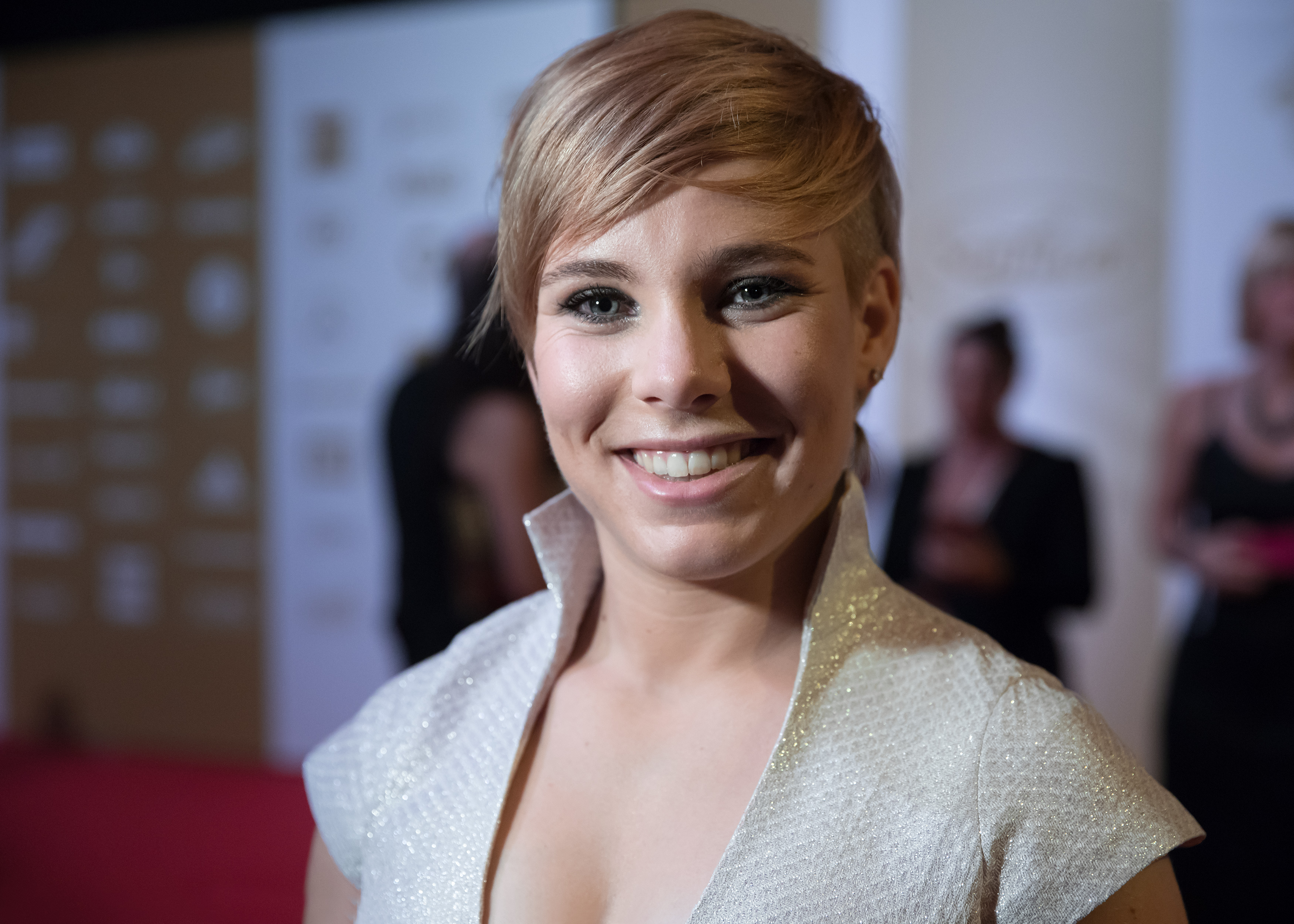
Nicole Schmidhofer, 2017

- Heinrich Harrer (1912 – 2006), Austrian mountaineer, sportsman, geographer, and author of the books Seven Years in Tibet (1952) and The White Spider (1959), died locally
- Nik P. (born 1962), real name Nikolaus Presnik, an Austrian schlager singer.
- Josef Bucher (born 1965), politician (BZÖ)
- Robert Stadlober (born 1982), actor and musician.

=== Sport ===
- Gerda Hofstätter (born 1971), professional billiards and pool player
- Jürgen Säumel (born 1984), football player, played 313 games and 20 for Austria
- Nicole Schmidhofer (born 1989), an Austrian former World Cup alpine ski racer and world champion at the FIS Alpine World Ski Championships 2017 – Women's super-G
