= Bad Tatzmannsdorf =

- Municipality
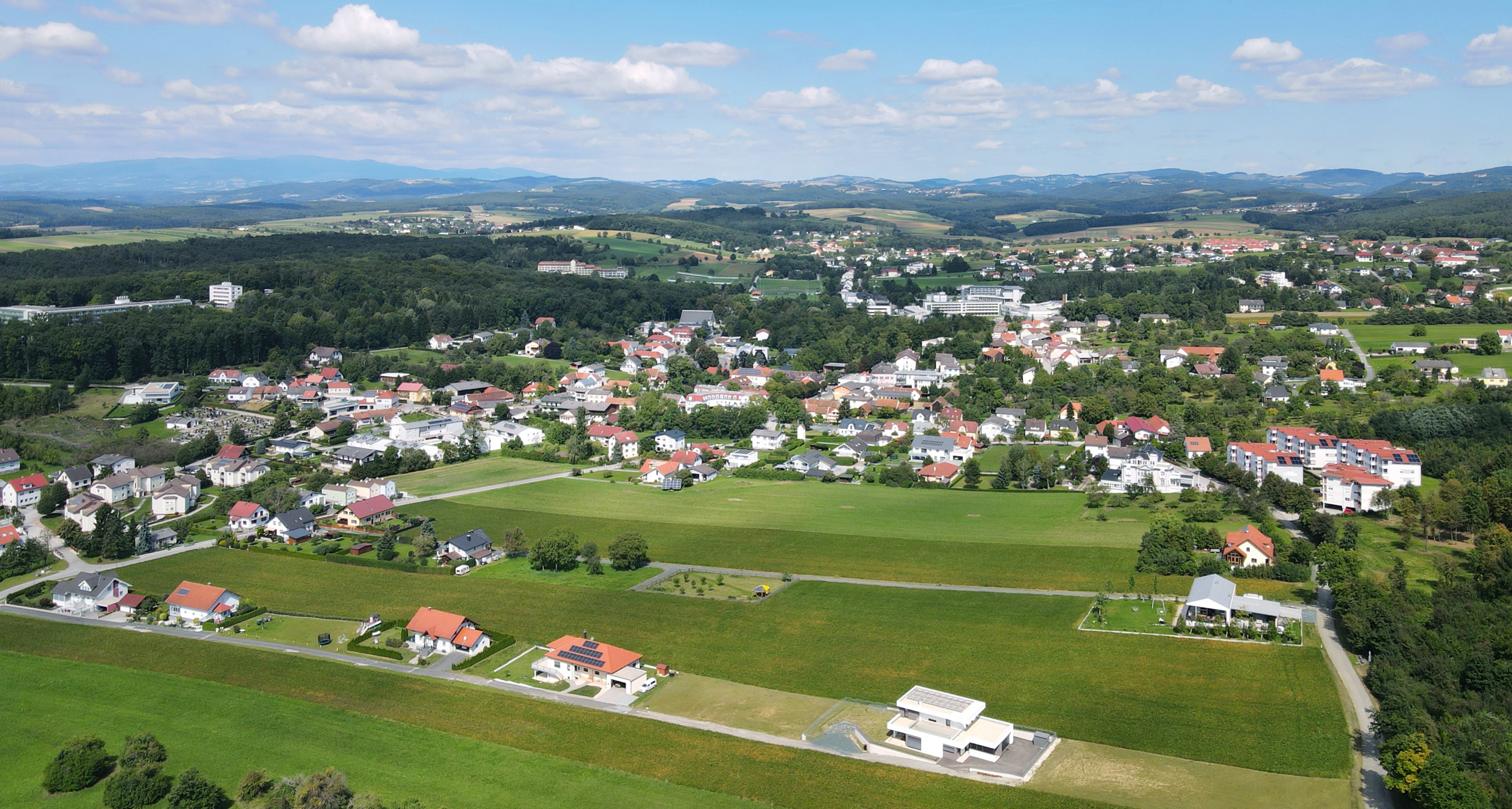
- Aerial view of Bad Tatzmannsdorf

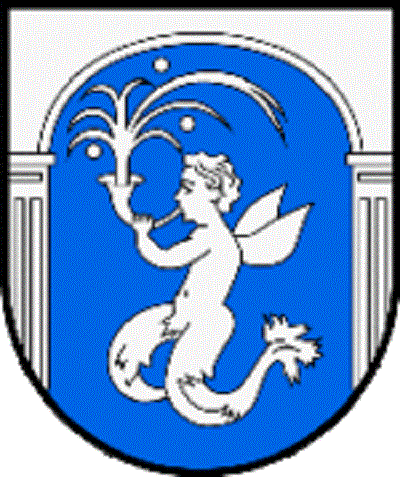
- Coat of arms

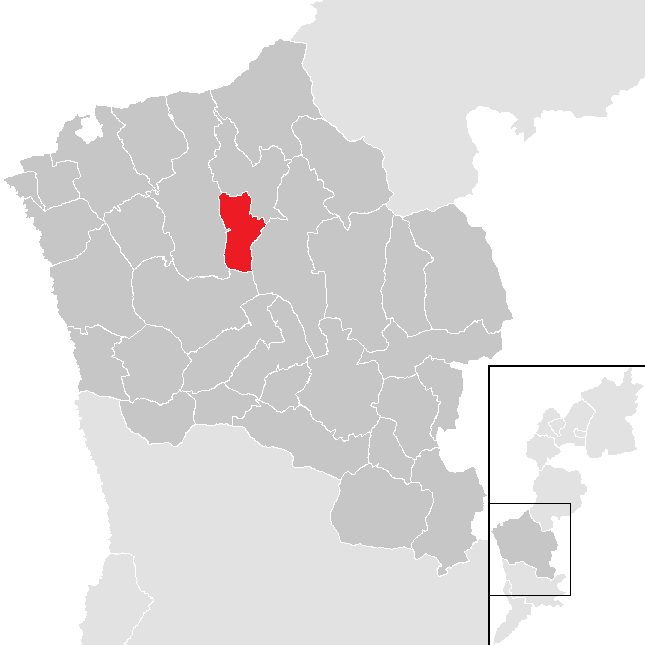
- Location within Oberwart district

- Location within Austria
- Coordinates: 47°20′N 16°14′E
- Country: Austria
- State: Burgenland
- District: Oberwart

Government
  - Mayor: Gert Polster (SPÖ)

Area
  - Total: 11.63 km^{2} (4.49 sq mi)

Population (2023-01-01)
  - Total: 1,647
  - Density: 141.6/km^{2} (366.8/sq mi)
- Time zone: UTC+1 (CET)
  - Summer (DST): UTC+2 (CEST)
- Postal code: 7431
- Website: www.bad-tatzmannsdorf.at

Bad Tatzmannsdorf (Hungarian: Tarcsafürdő, Croatian: Tarča) is a municipality in Burgenland in the district of Oberwart in Austria.

== Geography ==
Parts of the municipality are Bad Tatzmannsdorf, Jormannsdorf, and Sulzriegel.

The countryside has rolling hills which are popular with walkers.

In recent years the town has developed hot water spa facilities which are provided by a number of spa hotels and a public facility called the Burgenland Spa.

== History ==
Bad Tatzmannsdorf had a settlement as early as the 11th century. The earlier Hungarian name of Bad Tatzmannsdorf, Tarcsa, derives from its historical ownership by a minor noble family known as the “de Tarcsa”. The town is mentioned in Urbars as early as 1378. German settlers arrived in the 14th and 15th centuries. Devastated by the Turks in 1529 and 1532, the town was subsequently settled by Croats in 1572 under the leadership of Gregor Tarrody, and later acquired by the Batthyany family in 1633. It became a favored health resort for the Konigsberg, Erdody, Batthyany, and Esterhazy families. Bad Tatzmannsdorf has long been recognized as an important health resort, and there are numerous legends of remarkable cures associated with Bad Tatzmannsdorf. Its spring waters, composed of alkaline, iron, and acidulous mineral water, is known since the Roman times. Bad Tatzmannsdorf gained recognition as a health spa in the Regensberger History (Chronik) of 1621. During the first half of the 1800s and beyond, it became a popular destination for visitors from Vienna, as mentioned by Adelbert Stifter in his novels. The resort area now boasts a variety of world-class hotels, museums, sports complexes, and more.

Between 1869 and 1921 Bad Tatzmannsdorf belonged to Hungary, like the whole of Burgenland.

== Population ==
Historical population
Year	Pop.	±%
1869	921	—
1880	977	+6.1%
1890	993	+1.6%
1900	959	−3.4%
1910	861	−10.2%
1923	892	+3.6%
1934	915	+2.6%
1939	901	−1.5%
1951	847	−6.0%
1961	892	+5.3%
1971	1,052	+17.9%
1981	1,092	+3.8%
1991	1,134	+3.8%
2001	1,316	+16.0%
2011	1,369	+4.0%
2018	1,554	+13.5%
2021	1,624	+4.5%
2023	1,647	+1.4%

== Politics ==
Of the 19 positions on the municipal council, the ÖVP has 8, the SPÖ 7, and the FPÖ 4.
