= Burgruine Petersberg =

Castle in Austria

Coordinates: 46°57′05″N 14°24′09″E

- Carinthia, Austria
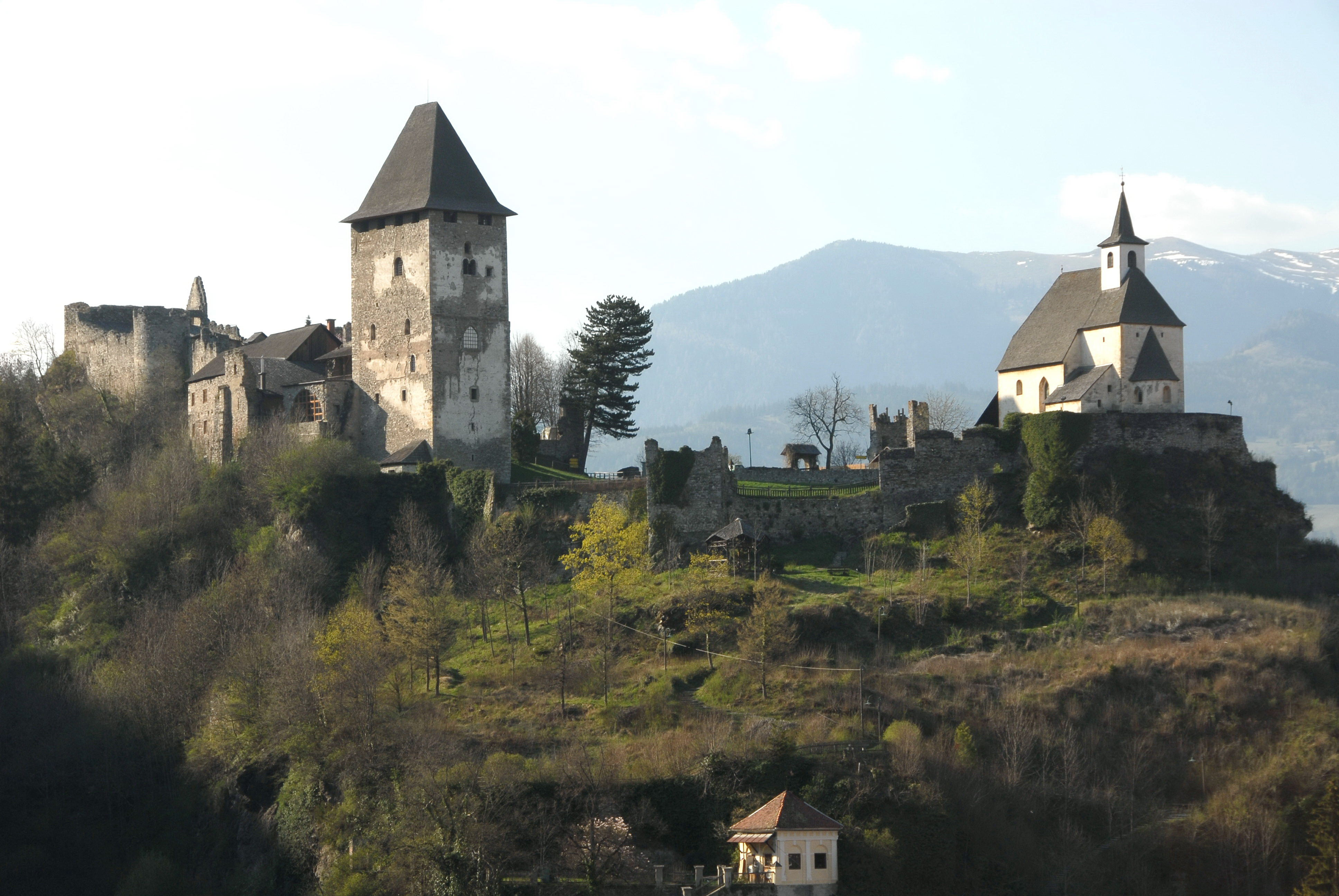

Site information
- Type: Castle

Site history
- Events: First referenced in 860

Burgruine Petersberg is a castle in Friesach, Carinthia, Austria.

Today the castle is home to the Friesach City Museum, which features exhibits about the town's history, culture, mining industry and trade.

== See also ==
- List of castles in Austria
