= Anton Bruckner Museum =

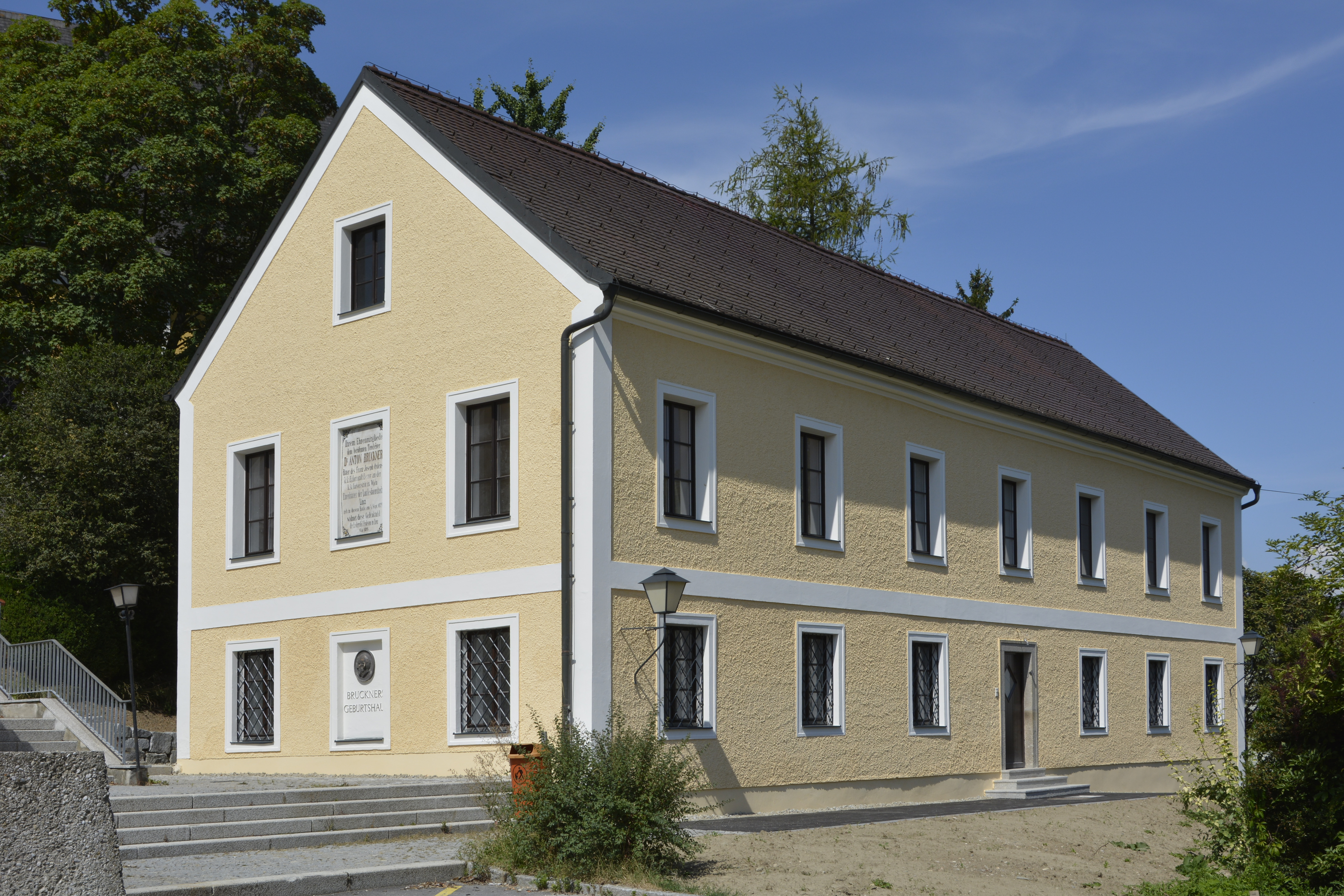

General information
- Address: Augustinerstraße 3, 4052 Ansfelden
- Country: Austria
- Coordinates: 48°12′33.8″N 14°17′27.6″E

Website
- Anton Bruckner Museum

The Anton Bruckner Museum is a museum about the composer Anton Bruckner (1824–1896), in Ansfelden, near Linz in Upper Austria. The building is the composer's birthplace.

== Description ==
=== Bruckner's life ===
The museum was originally a school building, and a residence for teachers. It was associated with the Bruckner family since 1777; Anton Bruckner's grandfather and father were schoolteachers here. Anton Bruckner was born in the schoolteacher's apartment on 4 September 1824. As a boy he sang in the choir of the Monastery of St Florian, in the nearby town of St Florian. Aged 17 he was an assistant teacher in Freistadt, and in 1851 became organist at the monastery of St Florian.

He became, after winning a competition, organist of Linz Cathedral in 1855. He moved to Vienna in 1868, where he was court organist, university lecturer, and became famous as a composer, particularly of symphonies.

He died in 1896; he is buried in the crypt of the Monastery of St Florian, next to the organ.

=== The museum ===
The building was replaced as a schoolhouse in 1907. In 1968 it was acquired by the State of Upper Austria, and in 1972 it was opened as a memorial site. It was updated in 1987, and after extensive renovation was re-opened in 2014.

In several rooms, the museum gives an impression of the life and work of the composer, and of the local community in his lifetime. There are items associated with the composer, in particular the baroque console of the organ of St Florian, which Bruckner played. There are musical instruments made in Linz in the mid 19th century, and a model of Ansfelden in 1820.

== See also ==
- List of music museums
