= Stadtschlaining =

- Municipality
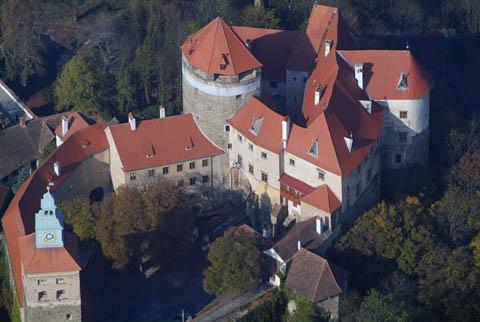

- Coat of arms

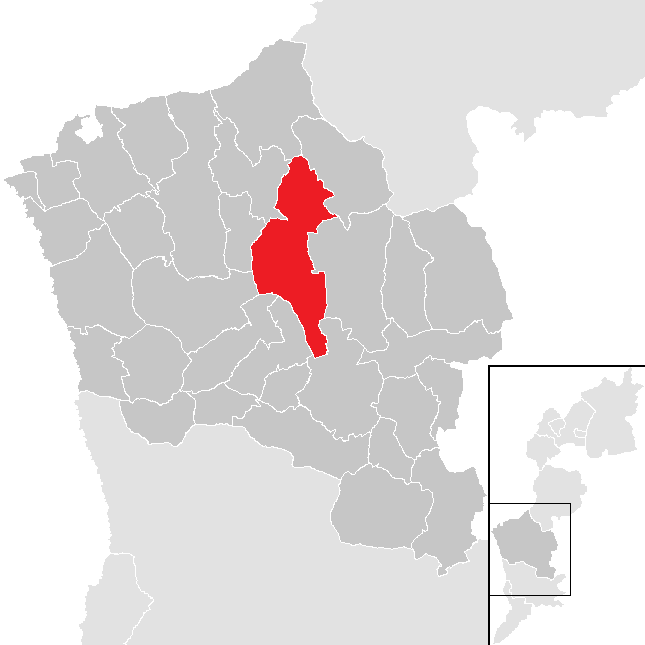
- Location within Oberwart district

- Location within Austria
- Coordinates: 47°19′N 16°16′E
- Country: Austria
- State: Burgenland
- District: Oberwart

Government
  - Mayor: Herbert Dienstl

Area
  - Total: 42.07 km^{2} (16.24 sq mi)
- Elevation: 409 m (1,342 ft)

Population (2018-01-01)
  - Total: 1,980
  - Density: 47.1/km^{2} (122/sq mi)
- Time zone: UTC+1 (CET)
  - Summer (DST): UTC+2 (CEST)
- Postal code: 7461
- Website: www.stadtschlaining.at

Stadtschlaining (Hungarian: Városszalónak, Város-Szalónak) is a town in the district of Oberwart in the Austrian state of Burgenland. The Burg Schlaining, built by Henry I Kőszegi, is located there, which hosts the Austrian Study Centre for Peace and Conflict Resolution (ASPR) and the Peace Museum.

== Population ==
The town is located in southern Burgenland on the western slopes of the Günser Gebirge.

Municipal division

The municipal area comprises the following five villages (in brackets: number of inhabitants as of January 1, 2023)

- Altschlaining (275)
- Drumling (231)
- Goberling (393)
- Neumarkt im Tauchental (388)
- Stadtschlaining (678)

The municipality consists of the cadastral communities of Altschlaining, Drumling, Goberling, Neumarkt im Tauchental and Stadtschlaining.

Historical population
Year	Pop.	±%
1869	3,586	—
1880	3,633	+1.3%
1890	3,675	+1.2%
1900	3,566	−3.0%
1910	3,121	−12.5%
1923	2,795	−10.4%
1934	2,695	−3.6%
1939	2,567	−4.7%
1951	2,424	−5.6%
1961	2,255	−7.0%
1971	2,273	+0.8%
1981	2,203	−3.1%
1991	2,284	+3.7%
2001	2,093	−8.4%
2011	2,064	−1.4%

== Gallery ==
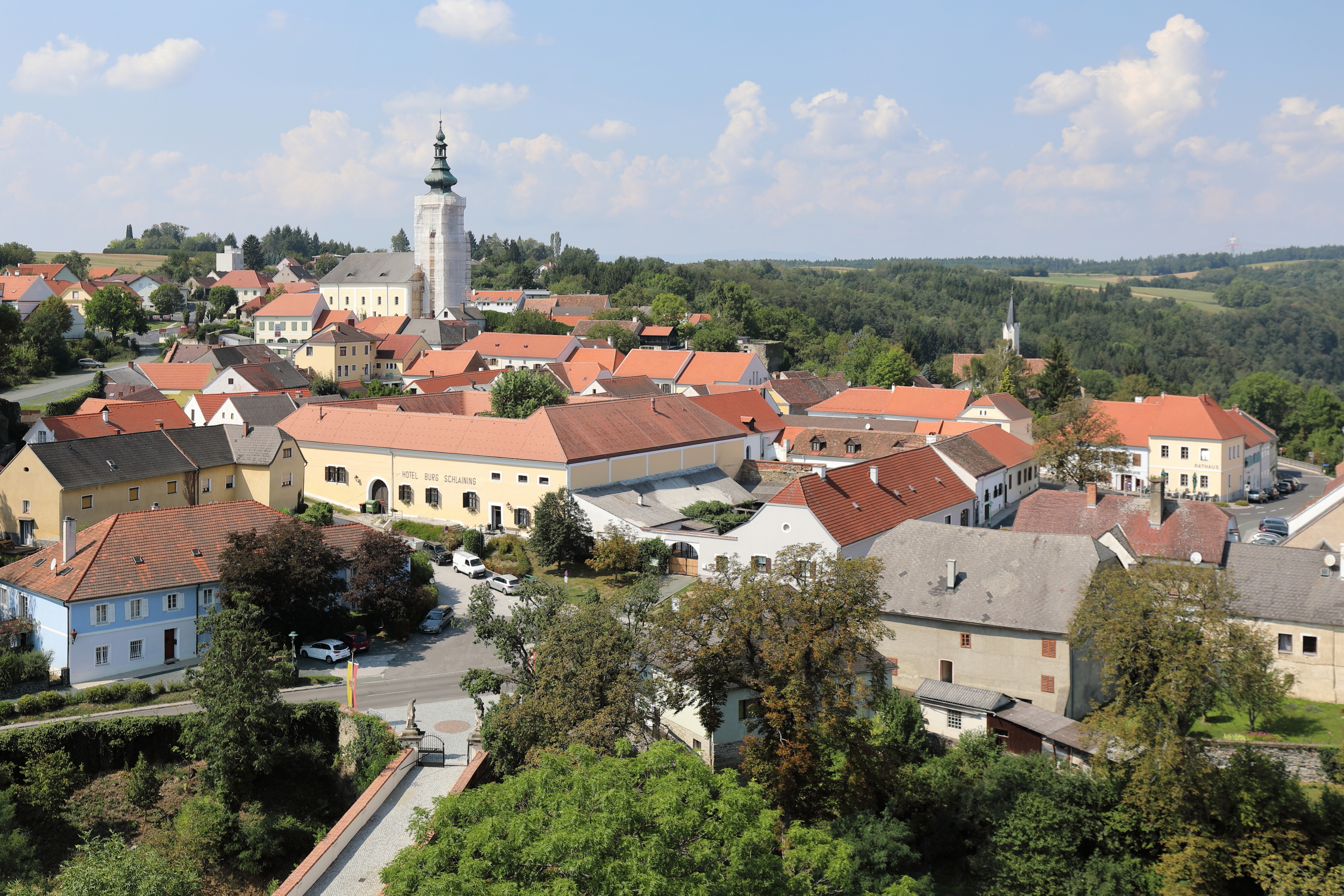
Center of Stadtschlaining

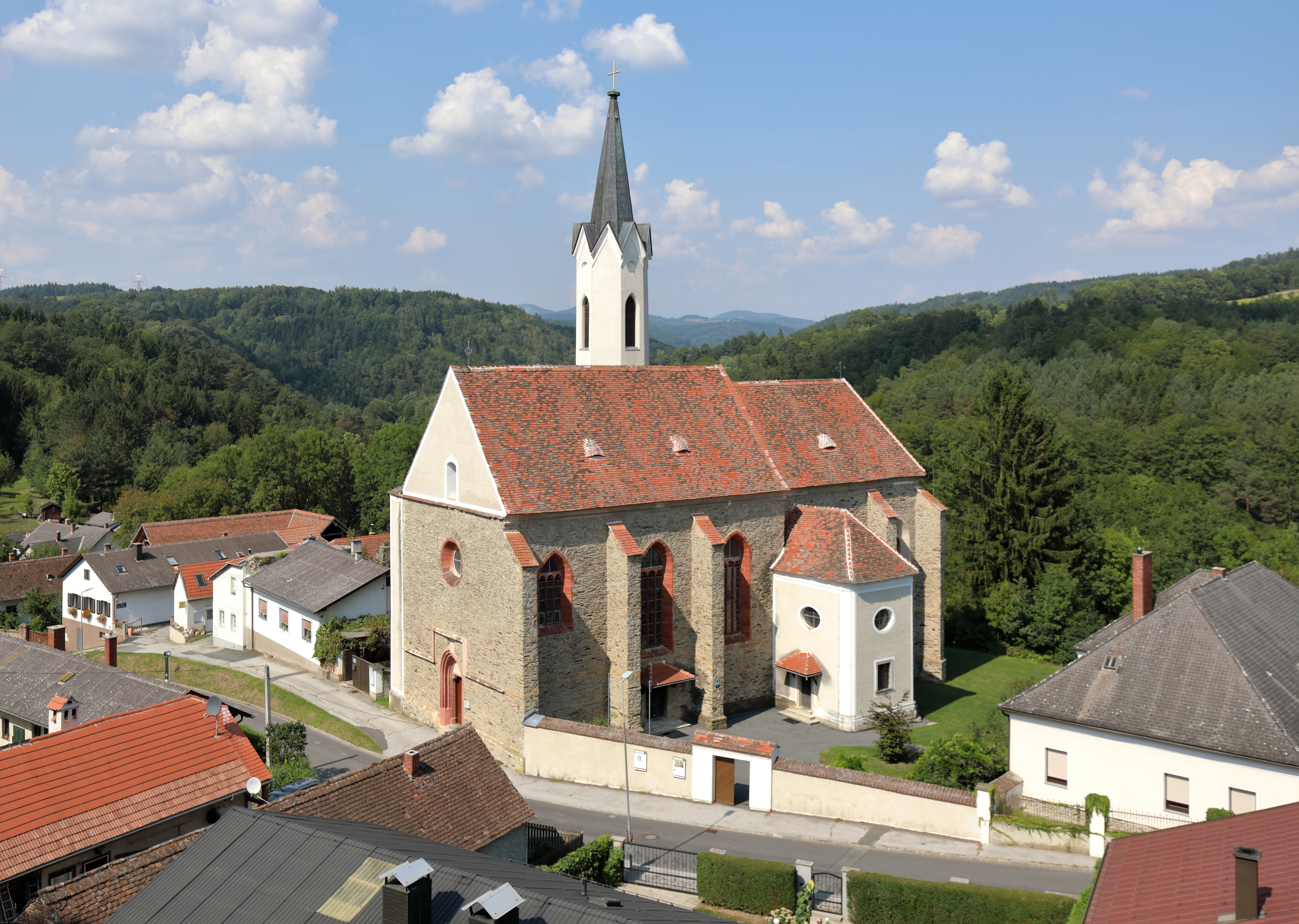
Catholic parish church

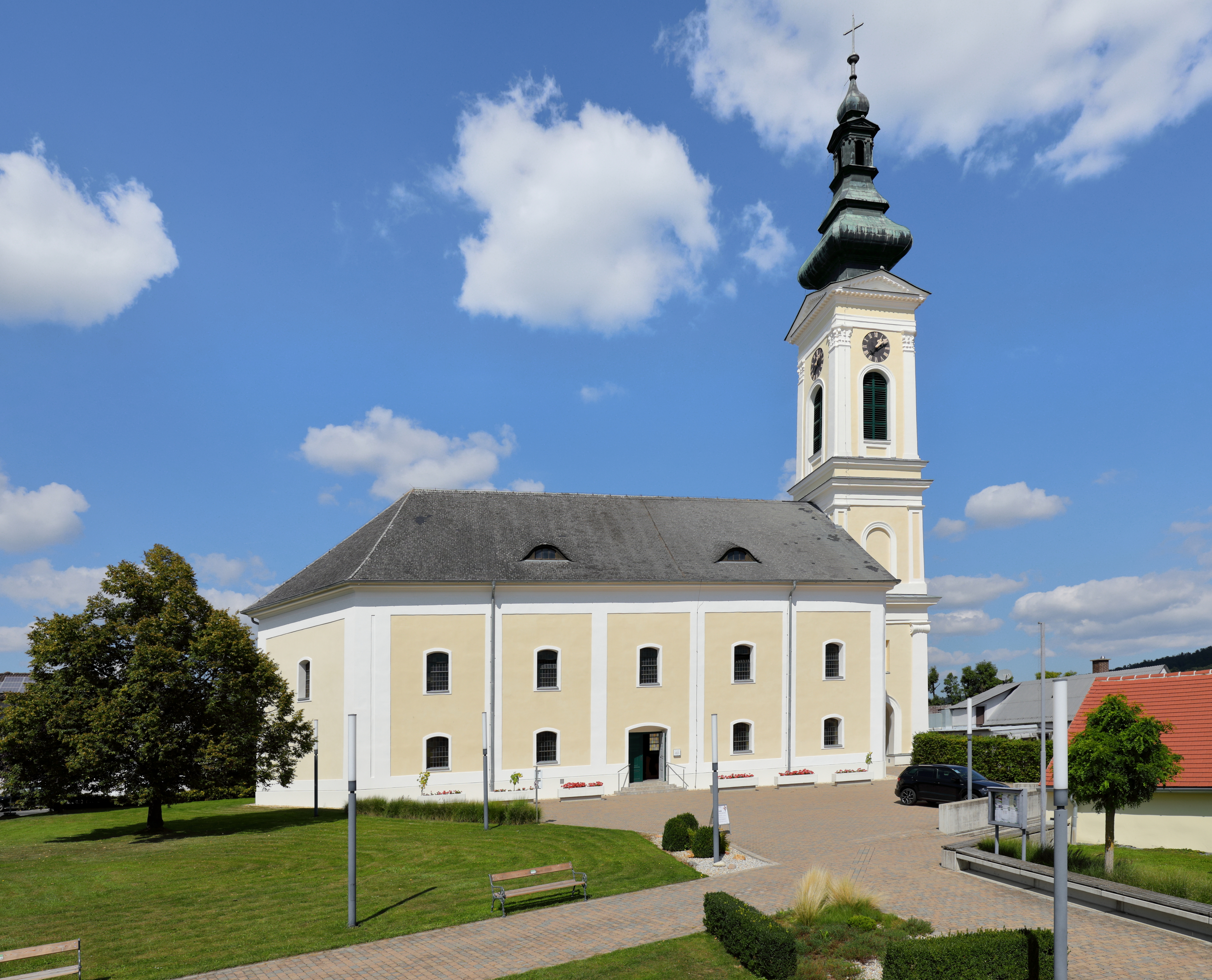
Protestant parish church

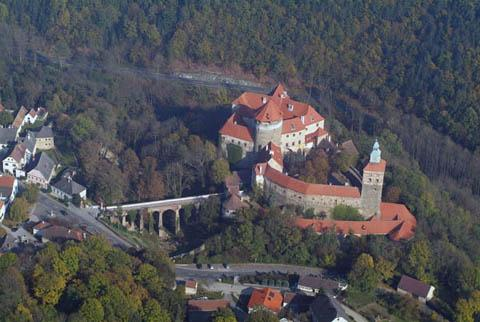
