= Composing hut of Gustav Mahler =

Composing hut of Gustav Mahler may refer to

- Composing hut of Gustav Mahler (Attersee), a little museum and memorial in Steinbach am Attersee, Austria
- Composing hut of Gustav Mahler (Wörthersee), a little museum and memorial in Maiernigg near Maria Wörth, Austria
- Gustav Mahler Stube, Trenkerhof, Composing hut of Gustav Mahler (Toblach), a little museum and memorial in Toblachin Altschluderbach, Toblach, Italy
