= Symphony No. 7 (Mahler) =

Instrumental symphony composed by Gustav Mahler

- by Gustav Mahler
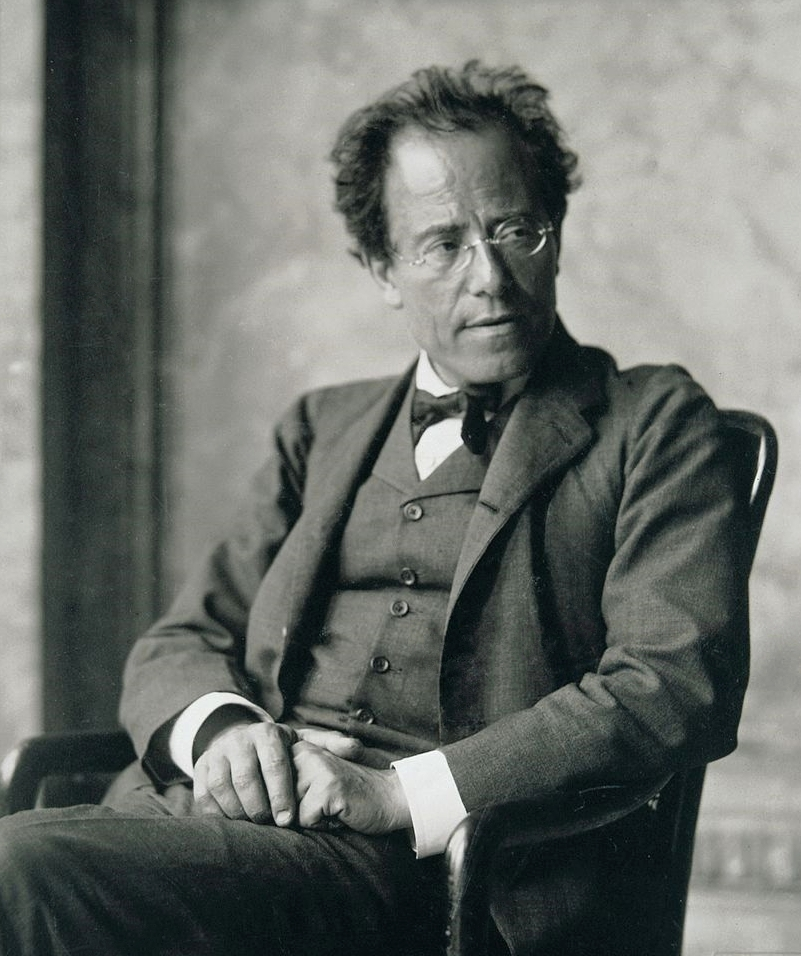
- Gustav Mahler in 1907
- Other name: Song of the Night or Lied der Nacht
- Key: (E minor –) C major
- Composed: 1904–05: Maiernigg
- Published: 1909: Berlin
- Publisher: Bote & Bock
- Duration: 75-80 minutes
- Movements: 5

Premiere
- Date: 19 September 1908
- Location: Prague
- Conductor: Gustav Mahler
- Performers: Czech Philharmonic

The Symphony No. 7 by Gustav Mahler is a symphony in five movements composed in 1904–05, sometimes referred to by the title Song of the Night (German: Lied der Nacht), which was not the composer's own designation. Although the symphony is often described as being in the key of E minor, its tonal scheme is more complicated. The symphony's first movement moves from B minor (introduction) to E minor, and the work ends with a rondo finale in C major. Thus, as Dika Newlin has pointed out, "in this symphony Mahler returns to the ideal of 'progressive tonality' which he had abandoned in the Sixth".

== Background ==
In 1904, Mahler was enjoying great international success as a conductor, but he was also, at last, beginning to enjoy international success as a composer. His second daughter was born that June, and during his customary summer break away from Vienna in his lakeside retreat at Maiernigg in the Carinthian mountains, he finished his Symphony No. 6 and sketched the second and fourth movements (the two Nachtmusik movements) for Symphony No. 7 while mapping out much of the rest of the work. He then worked on the Seventh intensively the following summer. While Mahler later claimed to take just four weeks to complete the first, third and fifth movements, scholars have asserted that a timeframe of six to seven weeks is more plausible.

The completed score was dated 15 August 1905, and the orchestration was finished in 1906; he laid the Seventh aside to make small changes to the orchestration of Symphony No. 6, while rehearsing for its premiere in May 1906. The Seventh had its premiere on 19 September 1908, in Prague with the Czech Philharmonic, at the festival marking the Diamond Jubilee of Emperor Franz Joseph.

The three years which elapsed between the completion of the score and the symphony's premiere witnessed dramatic changes in Mahler's life and career. In March 1907 he had resigned his conductorship of the Vienna State Opera, as the musical community in Vienna turned against him (which was why he chose Prague for the work's debut); on 12 July his first daughter died of scarlet fever; and, even as she lay on her deathbed, Mahler learned that he was suffering from an incurable heart condition. Musicologists surmise that this is why the optimism and cheerfulness of the symphony was subsequently tempered by the small but significant revisions Mahler made in the years leading up to its premiere.

The symphony was first published in 1909 by the firm Bote & Bock. In 1960, a critical edition of the symphony edited by Erwin Ratz appeared, correcting about 800 printing errors. Two years later, Hans Redlich's edition of the symphony was published without any of Mahler's amendments to the score made after publication, unlike Ratz's edition. In 2012, a new critical edition (Volume VII as part of the New Critical Complete Edition of Gustav Mahler's Works; edited by the International Gustav Mahler Society) prepared by Reinhold Kubik was published. As of 2019, Breitkopf & Härtel has plans to publish score and parts for the Seventh Symphony as part of their complete "Gustav Mahler - The Symphonies."

== Instrumentation ==
The symphony is scored for large orchestra. As in some of his other symphonies (particularly his 5th and 6th), Mahler's use of unconventional instruments is displayed in the 7th with the scoring of tenorhorn, cowbells, guitar and mandolin. The orchestra consists of the following:

Woodwinds
piccolo
4 flutes (4th doubling 2nd piccolo in movement 1)
3 oboes
cor anglais
E♭ clarinet
3 B♭ and A clarinets
bass clarinet
3 bassoons
contrabassoon

Brass
tenorhorn (used only in movement 1) (Note: Mahler's specification of a Tenorhorn in the scoring of this work has often caused confusion. In Britain, the name 'tenor horn' is often given to the instrument that in the US is called the alto horn (in E♭ or F); in Germany this (a contralto saxhorn) is known as the Althorn in E♭ or F, and is not the instrument requested by Mahler. Nor does Mahler intend a euphonium, which in German is called either Euphonium or Baryton. The German Tenorhorn is actually a B♭ instrument similar to the instrument known in Britain and the USA as the baritone horn.)
4 horns
3 trumpets
3 trombones
tuba

Percussion
4 timpani
bass drum
snare drum (used only in movement 1)
cymbals
triangle
cowbells (used offstage in movement 2; onstage in movement 5)
tambourine (used only in first movement)
tam-tam
rute (used in movements 2 and 5)
untuned bells (used only in movement 5)
glockenspiel (keyboard and mallet)

Strings
mandolin (used only in movement 4)
guitar (used only in movement 4)
2 harps

1st violins
2nd violins
violas
cellos
double basses

== Structure ==
The duration of the symphony is around 80 minutes. There is, however, an exceptionally lengthy recording by Otto Klemperer, which is 100 minutes long. Another recording by Hermann Scherchen with the Toronto Symphony Orchestra is 68 minutes long.

The work is in five movements:

=== I. Langsam – Allegro risoluto, ma non troppo ===
I. Langsam – Allegro

(E minor, beginning B minor)

The movement is in sonata form. It begins with a slow introduction in B minor, launched by a dark melody played by a Tenorhorn.

The accompaniment rhythm

was said to have come to Mahler whilst rowing on the lake at Maiernigg after a period of compositional drought. The principal theme, presented by horns in unison in E minor, is accompanied similarly, though much faster and in a higher register.

The second theme is then presented by violins, accompanied by sweeping cello arpeggios.

This theme is infected with chromatic sequences. At one point the violins reach an F♯_{7} (the highest F♯ on a piano). The exposition is wrapped up with a march theme from the introduction, which is followed by a repeat of the principal theme.

This leads straight into the development, which continues for some time before suddenly being interrupted by pianissimo trumpet fanfares and a slow chorale based on the march theme from the introduction.

This section has been interpreted as a "religious vision". It has also been asserted that this section contains the chains of fourths that impressed Arnold Schoenberg. After this section plays itself out, a harp glissando propels the music into a new section based on the second theme and the march/chorale theme. But before a climax can be articulated, the final cadence is interrupted by the music from the introduction and the baritone horn arioso. This leads into the recapitulation, but before the actual recapitulation occurs, there is an incredibly difficult high note for trumpet. In fact, the principal trumpet for the work's premiere even confronted Mahler, saying "I'd just like to know what's beautiful about blowing away at a trumpet stopped up to high C♯." Mahler had no answer, but later pointed out to his wife Alma that the man did not understand the agony of his own existence.

The recapitulation is very similar to the exposition, although it is significantly more agitated. There is a grand pause during the first thematic section that leads into a massive climax. The second theme is also considerably shortened. The march theme from the introduction leads straight into an epic coda that features march rhythms and multiple high points in the orchestral texture, before ending on an E major chord.

The lengthy and dramatically intense first movement is followed by three distinct pictures of night: two movements entitled "Nachtmusik" (i.e. nocturne) and a "shadowy" scherzo in between them.

=== II. Nachtmusik I ===
II. Nachtmusik

Allegro moderato. Molto moderato (Andante) C major – C minor

The Night Watch by Rembrandt. Mahler compared the first Nachtmusik with this painting.

The first of the two Nachtmusik movements is said to represent a Nachtwanderung ("wandering by night"). Mahler, who described the movement in vague terms, compared it to Rembrandt's painting The Night Watch, though he did not intend to evoke the painting itself. Overall, the movement possesses a grotesque quality, but always with friendly intentions. The movement progresses through a series of marches and dances and naturalistic nocturnal descriptions. One remarkable aspect of the movement is its symmetrical form; it is a rondo following the structure (I)–(A)–(B)–(I/A)–(C)–(I/A)–(B)–(A)–(I), where (I) is an introductory section and (I/A) combines the introductory music and the (A) theme.

The second movement opens with horns calling to each other.

The second horn is muted, however, to create the illusion of distance. Scampering woodwinds imitating somewhat grotesque bird calls pass off into the distance, as the trumpets sound the major/minor seal from Symphony No. 6. The horns introduce a rich, somewhat bucolic (A) theme, surrounded by dancing strings and a march rhythm from his song "Revelge".

This theme leads to some confusion about the key, as it switches between C major and C minor every few beats. The rural mood is heightened by a gentle, rustic dance for the (B) section – typical of Mahler at his most carefree and childlike – as well as by the gentle clanking of distant cowbells in the returns of the introductory section. The malicious (C) theme, upon its return, is arabesqued by the "Revelge" rhythms and bird calls from earlier in the movement.

=== III. Scherzo ===
III. Scherzo

Schattenhaft. Fließend aber nicht zu schnell ("Shadowy. Flowing but not too fast") D major

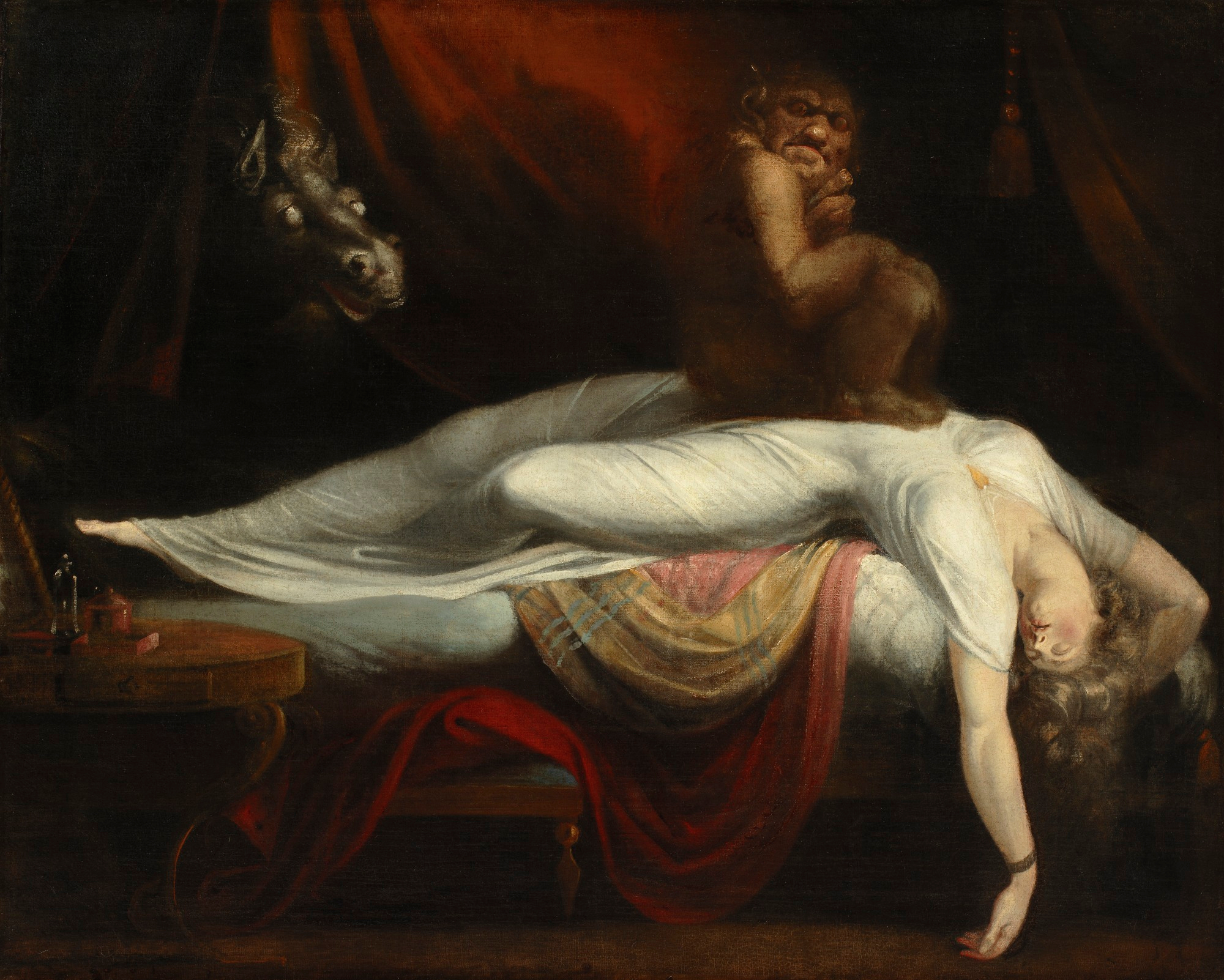
The Nightmare by Henry Fuseli, illustrating the sinister mood that pervades this scherzo

There is an undercurrent of night about the spooky third movement; while "scherzo" means "joke", this movement is remarkably spooky and even grim. If the first Nachtmusik possessed a friendly mood disguised in grotesqueries, this movement is a demon sneering at the listener. Nonetheless, as the Spanish musicologist José L. Pérez de Arteaga points out, this movement is really "a most morbid and sarcastic mockery of the Viennese waltz".

The movement begins with a strange gesture: a pianissimo dialogue between timpani and pizzicato basses and cellos with sardonic interjections from the winds. After some buildup, the orchestra sets off on a threatening waltz, complete with unearthly woodwind shrieks and ghostly shimmerings from the basses, with a recurring "lamenting" theme in the woodwinds. The scherzo is contrasted by a warmer trio in the major mode, introduced by and containing a "shrieking" motif beginning in the oboes and descending through the orchestra.

The brilliance of this movement lies in its extraordinary and original orchestration, which gives this movement a strongly nightmarish quality. Multiple viola solos rise above the texture, and there is a persistent timpani and pizzicato motif that pervades the dance. The theme and its accompaniment are both passed around the orchestra rather than being played by a specific instrument. At one memorable point in the score, the cellos and double basses are instructed to play pizzicato with the volume fffff, with the footnote, "pluck so hard that the strings hit the wood".

IV. Nachtmusik 2

=== IV. Nachtmusik II ===
Andante amoroso. F major

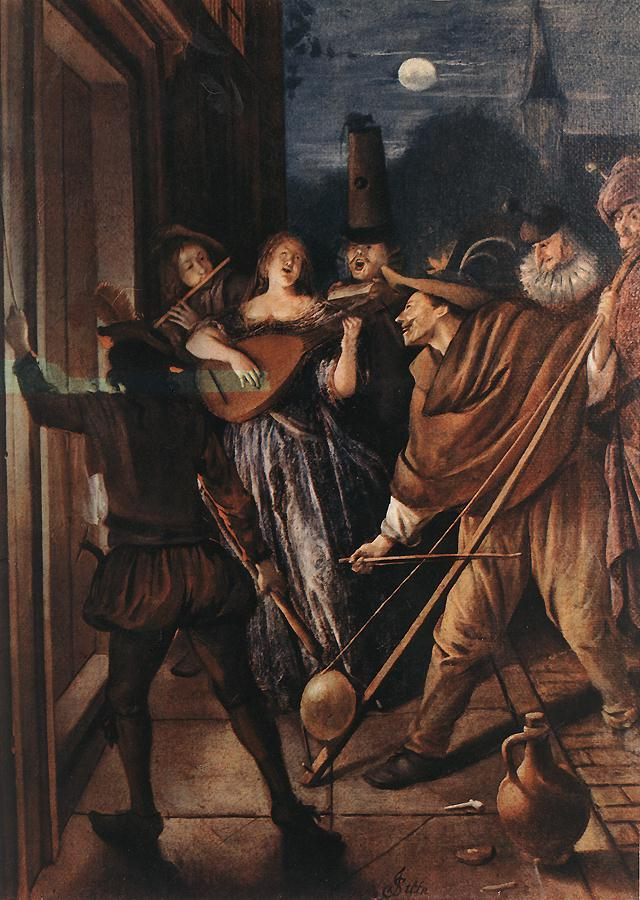
Nocturnal Serenade by Jan Steen, depicting an intimate serenade of the kind Mahler parodies in "Nachtmusik II"

The fourth movement (the second Nachtmusik) contrasts with the first in that it illustrates a more intimate and human scene. With its amoroso marking and reduced instrumentation (trombones, tuba and trumpets are silent and the woodwinds are reduced by half) this movement has been described as "a long stretch of chamber music set amidst this huge orchestral work". A solo violin introduces the movement,

while a horn solo above the gentle tones of a guitar and mandolin create a magical serenade character.

However, sardonic dissonances give this movement a more satirical and even diseased feel. The trio contrasts with this, and more reflects the intimate mood that would be expected from a Viennese serenade. The movement ends in transcendence, providing a peaceful backdrop for the finale's abrupt entrance.

Hans Heinrich Eggebrecht accounted for the unusual musical episodes of this movement by offering a program in which Mahler walks through Vienna one evening,

at night, and takes in all the music he can hear: happy violins, quivering mandolins, guitar and the clarinet, the voices of all the other instruments. Schrammel music, strummed pianos—and then he walks on, happy, filled with beauty. There are other sounds, melodies and strains from the left and from the right. There is also the Opera house, music from the Volkstheater, and at the end the coffee-houses close, the music fades, the lights go out, night falls.

Thomas Peattie thus described it as "nothing less than an aural mapping of the city at night". He noted that the metaphor of walking was often heard musically as a succession of fragmentary tableaux. (Note: While the metaphor of the urban walk is also a common trope in modernist literature (e.g., Woolf's Mrs. Dalloway, Arthur Schnitzler's Lieutenant Gustl, Joyce's Ulysses) Peattie emphasized the nostalgia for an idealized Vienna here.)

=== V. Rondo Finale ===
V. Rondo Finale

Boisterous timpani joined by blazing brass set the scene for the riotous final movement in C major.

The long, arduous first movement, after three shorter movements developmental in mood, is finally equalled by a substantial "daylight" finale. The movement is a rondo combined with a set of eight variations, capped off by a dramatic coda. There are parodies of Wagner's Die Meistersinger von Nürnberg and Franz Lehár's The Merry Widow. There are many strange and abrupt interruptions of climactic buildups, including at the very end of the coda. The texture is, for the most part, based on a banal descending broken scale motif.

There is also a heavy emphasis on acerbic brass chorales and relentlessly satirical rustic dances. Little wonder that, of all the symphony's movements, this has come in for the greatest amount of criticism and puzzlement. It has been seen by many as something of a let-down and somewhat superficial, dodging questions set by the previous movements; its virtually unrelenting mood of celebration seems quite at odds with the dark character of the earlier movements. "A vigorous life-asserting pageant of Mahlerian blatancy", is how Michael Kennedy describes it, and Mahler himself explained it with the aperçu "The world is mine!" The principal theme of the first movement crops up amidst the outrageously exuberant finale, but is soon quelled and reappears in the major mode. Cowbells from the first Nachtmusik and the unpitched low bells from Mahler's Symphony No. 6 also make appearances. The movement (and therefore the symphony) ends in a very strange way; a seemingly random stray G♯ changes the harmonic quality from major to augmented, the music suddenly drops to piano before a stubborn fff C major chord ends the work.

== Reception ==
=== Performances ===
==== Mahler's Central Europe premieres ====
Mahler conducted the premiere of his Symphony No. 7 in Prague in 1908. A few weeks later he conducted it in Munich and the Netherlands. The audience and performers were confused by the work in Prague, and it was not well received.

==== Mitropolous in New York, Downes–Schoenberg exchange ====
On November 12, 1948, The New York Times' critic Olin Downes reviewed a New York Philharmonic concert led by Dimitri Mitropoulos, calling the symphony an "atrocity" of "dreary platitudes" and conceding only "chacun à son goût" (to each his own taste). Alma likely sent it to Arnold Schoenberg in Los Angeles, underscoring "This malicious ...".

The Second Viennese School, including Anton Webern, revered the Seventh. Schoenberg drafted a two-page essay addressed to Downes, typed by pupil Patricia Carpenter. It included annotated musical examples from the last two movements and argued that music critics must not rely on aesthetic taste, but study scores to identify "strokes of genius". He feared he lacked fighting energy, he wrote Alma, but felt an "example had to be put forth".

Schoenberg was not alone, and on November 21, Downes addressed others' replies. On December 12, the Times published most of Schoenberg's letter alongside Downes' public reply, and on December 16, Downes replied to Schoenberg privately.

==== Bernstein's advocacy and later reception ====
With the advocacy of Leonard Bernstein and others, the symphony gained a more positive reception later in the 20th century. It remains one of Mahler's less popular works in terms of recordings and performances.

=== Critical analysis ===
The harmonic and stylistic structure of the piece may be viewed as a depiction of the journey from dusk till dawn. The piece evolves from uncertain and hesitant beginnings to an unequivocal C major finale, with its echoes of Wagner's Die Meistersinger von Nürnberg, and its overture followed the symphony at the premiere.

This journey from night to day proceeds via the third movement scherzo, marked schattenhaft (shadowy), which may have been what prompted Schoenberg to become a particular champion of the work. The abundance of themes based upon the interval of a fourth has parallels with the First Chamber Symphony.

The piece has several motifs in common with the Symphony No. 6, notably the juxtaposition of major with minor chords, the march figure of the first movement, and the use of cowbells within certain pastoral episodes.

Andrew Thomson has examined Mahler's use of fourth-based chords in the symphony. John Williamson has discussed in detail Mahler's first movement introduction in the context of Mahler's introductions in his earlier symphonies. Martin Scherzinger has analysed the fifth movement of the symphony from a deconstructionist perspective informed by the methodology of Jacques Derrida. The work's tonal scheme has been analyzed in terms of "interlocking structures".

== Premieres ==
- World premiere: 19 September 1908, Prague, with the Czech Philharmonic conducted by the composer.
- Dutch premiere: 2 October 1909, The Hague, with the Concertgebouw Orchestra conducted by the composer.
- British premiere: 18 January 1913, London, conducted by Henry Wood.
- American premiere: 15 April 1921, Chicago, conducted by Frederick Stock.

== Selected discography ==
- Claudio Abbado:
  - Chicago Symphony Orchestra (Deutsche Grammophon 289 445 513–2, 1984)
  - Berlin Philharmonic Orchestra (Deutsche Grammophon 289 471 623–2, 2002)
  - Lucerne Festival Orchestra (DVD, Euroarts Musik 80242 54628, 2005)
- Maurice Abravanel, Utah Symphony Orchestra (Vanguard VSD 71141/2, 1965)
- Vladimir Ashkenazy, Sydney Symphony Orchestra (Sydney Symphony Live SSO201104, 2011)
- Daniel Barenboim, Staatskapelle Berlin (Teldec 2564 62963–2, 2006)
- Leonard Bernstein:
  - New York Philharmonic (Columbia, 1966)
  - Vienna Philharmonic Orchestra (DVD, Unitel/Deutsche Grammophon, 1974)
  - New York Philharmonic (Deutsche Grammophon 289 479 454–3, 1986)
- Gary Bertini, Kölner Rundfunk-Sinfonie-Orchester (EMI Classics)
- Alexandre Bloch, Orchestre national de Lille (Alpha ALPHA592, 2020)
- Pierre Boulez:
  - The Cleveland Orchestra (Deutsche Grammophon 289 447 756–2, 1996)
  - Royal Concertgebouw Orchestra (DVD, 425008 378046, 2012; live performance from January 2011)
- Riccardo Chailly:
  - Royal Concertgebouw Orchestra (Decca 289 444 446–2)
  - Leipzig Gewandhaus Orchestra (DVD, Accentus Music ACC20309 [standard DVD] and ACC10309 [Blu-Ray], 2015)
- Gustavo Dudamel, Simón Bolívar Symphony Orchestra (Deutsche Grammophon 289 479 170–0, 2014)
- Ádám Fischer, Düsseldorf Symphony Orchestra (AVI Music AVI8553349)
- Iván Fischer, Budapest Festival Orchestra (Channel Classics CCSSA38019, 2019)
- Simon Gaudenz, Jena Philharmonic (Odradek Records ODRCD450, 2024)
- Valery Gergiev, London Symphony Orchestra (LSO Live LSO0665, 2008)
- Michael Gielen:
  - SWR Sinfonieorchester Baden-Baden und Freiburg (Hänssler HAEN93030)
  - Berlin Philharmonic Orchestra (live September 1994 performance, Testament SBT1480, issued in 2013)
- Bernard Haitink:
  - Concertgebouw Orchestra (Philips, analogue recording, 1971)
  - Concertgebouw Orchestra (Philips 289 410 398–2, digital recording, 1983)
  - Berlin Philharmonic Orchestra (Philips 289 434 997–2, 1995)
  - Berlin Philharmonic Orchestra (live recording from 1992; DVD, Philips 44007 43133, issued in 1995)
  - Concertgebouw Orchestra (live recording from 25 December 1985 Kerstmatinee [Christmas Matinee], Philips 289 464 321–2; 1999 issue)
  - Bavarian Radio Symphony Orchestra (live recording from February 2011, BR Klassik 900209, issued in 2023)
- Michael Halász, Polish National Radio Symphony Orchestra (Naxos 8550531)
- Hartmut Haenchen, Netherlands Philharmonic Orchestra (Capriccio C10643)
- Gábor Hontvári, Junges Philharmonisches Orchester Niedersachsen (live recording from NDR Konzerthaus, Großer Sendesaal, Hannover 4 August 2024. Released 19 February 2025)
- Jascha Horenstein, New Philharmonia Orchestra (live recording from 29 August 1969, Royal Albert Hall, 1969 Proms; BBC Legends BBCL 4051–2, issued in 2000)
- Eliahu Inbal:
  - Frankfurt Radio Symphony (Denon 5715532, 2010)
  - Czech Philharmonic (Exton SACD EXCL-00077, 2011)
  - Tokyo Metropolitan Symphony Orchestra (Exton SACD OVCL-00517 & OVXL-00084 "One point microphone version", 2013)
- Paavo Järvi, Frankfurt Radio Symphony (DVD, C Major 729508 [standard DVD] and 729604 [Blu-Ray], 2015)
- Mariss Jansons:
  - Oslo Philharmonic (SIMAX PSC1271, 2009)
  - Bavarian Radio Symphony Orchestra (live recording, BR Klassik 403571900101, 2009)
  - Royal Concertgebouw Orchestra (live recording from 8 June 2007, RCO Live RCO15002, 2015)
  - Royal Concertgebouw Orchestra (RCO Live RCO17006, 2018)
- Neeme Järvi, Residentie Orchestra (Chandos CHAN 5079, 2010)
- Otto Klemperer, New Philharmonia Orchestra (EMI Classics, originally recorded in 1968)
- Kirill Kondrashin
  - Leningrad Philharmonic Orchestra (Melodiya, 1975)
  - Concertgebouw Orchestra, Amsterdam (live performance of 29 November 1979, Tahra TAH451, issued in 2002)
- Rafael Kubelík:
  - Bavarian Radio Symphony Orchestra (Deutsche Grammophon, 1970)
  - Bavarian Radio Symphony Orchestra (live recording from 5 February 1976, Audite 95476)
  - New York Philharmonic (live recording from 28 February 1981; New York Philharmonic Special Editions NYP 9801-NYP 9812, 1999)
- Yoel Levi, Atlanta Symphony Orchestra (Telarc 2CD-80514, 1999)
- James Levine, Chicago Symphony Orchestra (RCA Red Seal RD84581, 1983)
- Lorin Maazel:
  - Vienna Philharmonic (CBS Masterworks M3K 42495, 1985)
  - Philharmonia Orchestra (Signum SIGCD362, 2015)
- Kurt Masur, Leipzig Gewandhaus Orchestra (Berlin Classics BC 2058-2 [reissue], original recording from 1982, reissue from 1992)
- Václav Neumann:
  - Leipzig Gewandhaus Orchestra (Berlin Classics 0090462BC [reissue], original recording from 1970, reissue from 1995)
  - Czech Philharmonic Orchestra (Supraphon, 1980)
- Jonathan Nott, Bamberg Symphony Orchestra (Tudor BR TUD7176, 2012)
- Seiji Ozawa, Boston Symphony Orchestra (Philips 289 426 249–2, 1990)
- Kirill Petrenko, Bavarian State Orchestra (BSO Recordings, BSOREC0001, 2021)
- Simon Rattle:
  - City of Birmingham Symphony Orchestra (live performance from 1991, EMI Classics CDC 7 54344 2, 1992)
  - Berlin Philharmonic (live recording; Berliner Philharmoniker BPHR200361, 2021)
  - Bavarian Radio Symphony Orchestra (BR Klassik 900225, 2025)
- Hans Rosbaud:
  - Berlin Radio Symphony Orchestra, 1952
  - SWR Sinfonieorchester Baden-Baden (1957 radio broadcast, SWR Music SWR19099CD, issued 2020)
- Yutaka Sado, Tonkünstler Orchestra (Tonkünstler Orchestra TON2015, 2024)
- Hermann Scherchen:
  - Vienna Symphony (Westminster, 1953)
  - Toronto Symphony Orchestra
- Leif Segerstam, Danish National Symphony Orchestra (Chandos CHAN9057W, 1992)
- Giuseppe Sinopoli, Philharmonia Orchestra (Deutsche Grammophon, 1992)
- Sir Georg Solti, Chicago Symphony Orchestra (Decca, 1971)
- Markus Stenz, Gürzenich Orchestra Cologne (Oehms Classics OC652)
- Emil Tabakov, Sofia Philharmonic Orchestra (Capriccio C49056, 1996)
- Klaus Tennstedt, London Philharmonic Orchestra:
  - EMI Classics CDS7 47879–8, 1983 (studio recording)
  - EMI Classics 7235 5 55294 2 8, 1995 (live recording from the Royal Festival Hall, May 1993)
- Michael Tilson Thomas:
  - London Symphony Orchestra (RCA Victor Red Seal 09026635102, 1999)
  - San Francisco Symphony (SFS Media SFS0009, 2005)
- Osmo Vänskä, Minnesota Orchestra (BIS BIS2386, 2020)
- Edo de Waart, Netherlands Radio Philharmonic (RCA Victor Red Seal 74321 276012 [complete cycle], 1995)
- Hans Zender, Rundfunk-Sinfonieorchester Saarbrücken (CPO 9994782, 2000)
- David Zinman, Tonhalle-Orchester Zürich (RCA Victor Red Seal 88697506502, 2009)

=== Recordings of arrangements by other composers ===
- Arrangement for chamber orchestra by Klaus Simon: Thomas Søndergård, Musicians from the Royal Scottish National Orchestra (Linn Records CKD 669)

== Bibliography ==
- Downes, Olin (12 November 1948). "Work by Poulenc Is Concert Feature: Composer Assists Mitropoulos and Philharmonic in Doing Harpsichord 'Champetre'". The New York Times. New York. ISSN 0362-4331.
- Downes, Olin (21 November 1948). "Mahler Again: Reactions of Disputatious Correspondents, Their Views and Dissenting Opinions". The New York Times. New York. ISSN 0362-4331.
- Downes, Olin (12 December 1948). "Exchange of Views: Distinguished Composer Discusses Mahler, Himself and Criticism—The Reply". The New York Times. New York. ISSN 0362-4331.
- George, Graham (1970). Tonality and Musical Structure. London: Faber & Faber. ISBN 978-0-571-08468-5.
- Keathley, Elizabeth L.; McCoy, Marilyn L., eds. (2019). Schoenberg's Correspondence with Alma Mahler [with annotations]. Schoenberg in Words. Vol. 7. New York: Oxford University Press. ISBN 978-0-19-538196-2. OCLC 1152328285.
- Peattie, Thomas (2015). Gustav Mahler's Symphonic Landscapes. Cambridge: Cambridge University Press. doi:10.1017/CBO9781139225243. ISBN 978-1-107-02708-4.
