= Composing hut of Gustav Mahler (Wörthersee) =

- Gustav Mahler-Komponierhäuschen
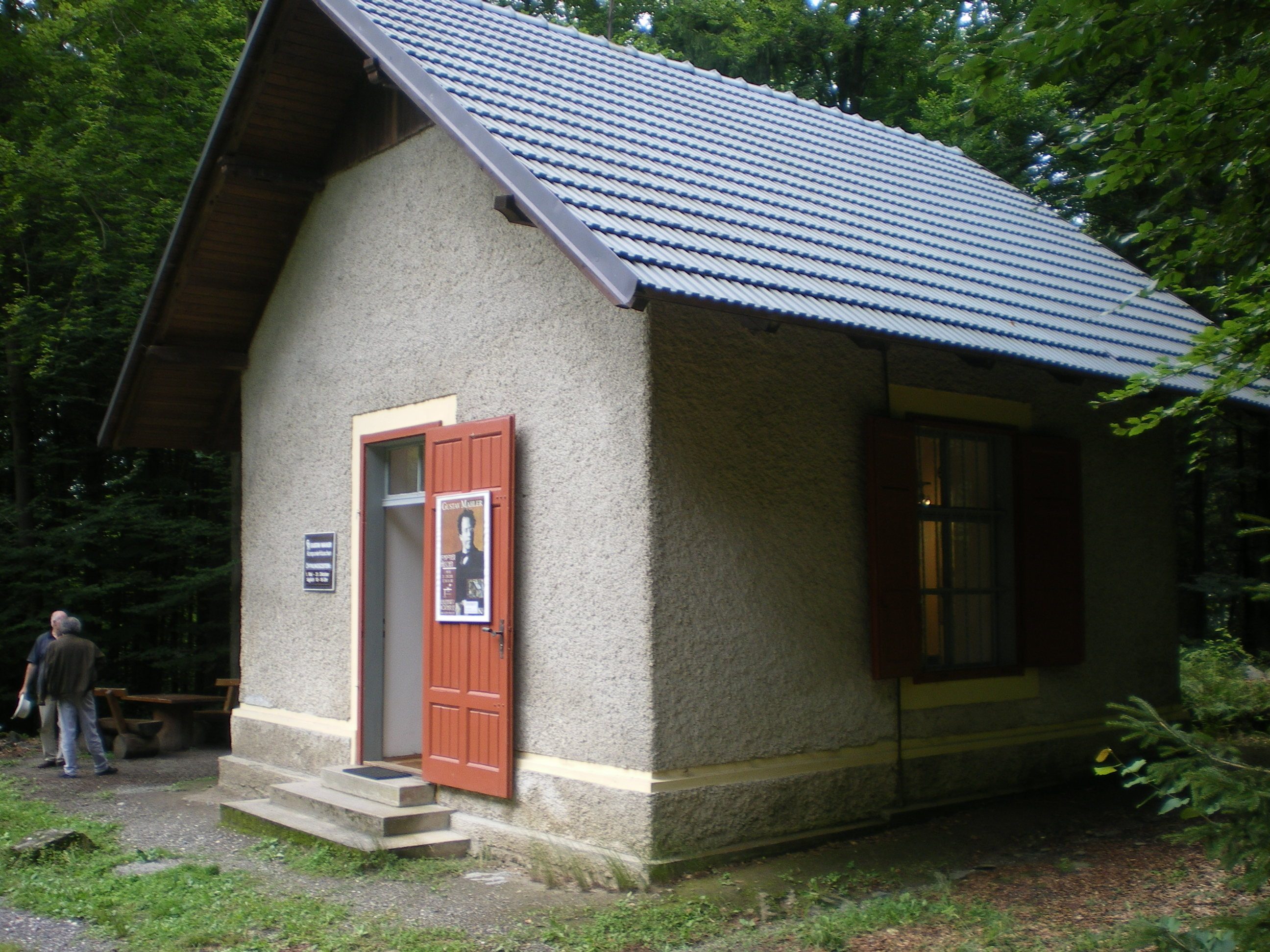
- image of 2008

- Location within Austria
- Established: 7 July 1986
- Location: Maiernigg, near Maria Wörth
- Coordinates: 46°36′40.24″N 14°14′4.56″E
- Type: biographical museum
- Collections: about Gustav Mahler
- Architect: Friedrich Theuer

The composing hut of Gustav Mahler (German: Gustav Mahler-Komponierhäuschen) is a small museum and memorial in Maiernigg, near Maria Wörth in Carinthia, Austria. It is dedicated to the classical composer Gustav Mahler (1860–1911). He retreated into this hut from 1900 to 1907 to compose music. Since 7 July 1986, a permanent exhibition has been established here.

There is also a composing hut at the Attersee, Upper Austria, and one next to the Gustav Mahler Stube in South Tyrol, Italy.

== Collection ==
In a display cabinet, visitors can view articles that remind of the composer, including photographs, original sheet music, postcards, letters and his death certificate. A bronze bust is placed in the room. A small library can be consulted there.

Visitors can listen to Mahler's music inside as well as outside the hut through loudspeakers. Since the renewal of 2016, art expressions have also been allowed near the hut.

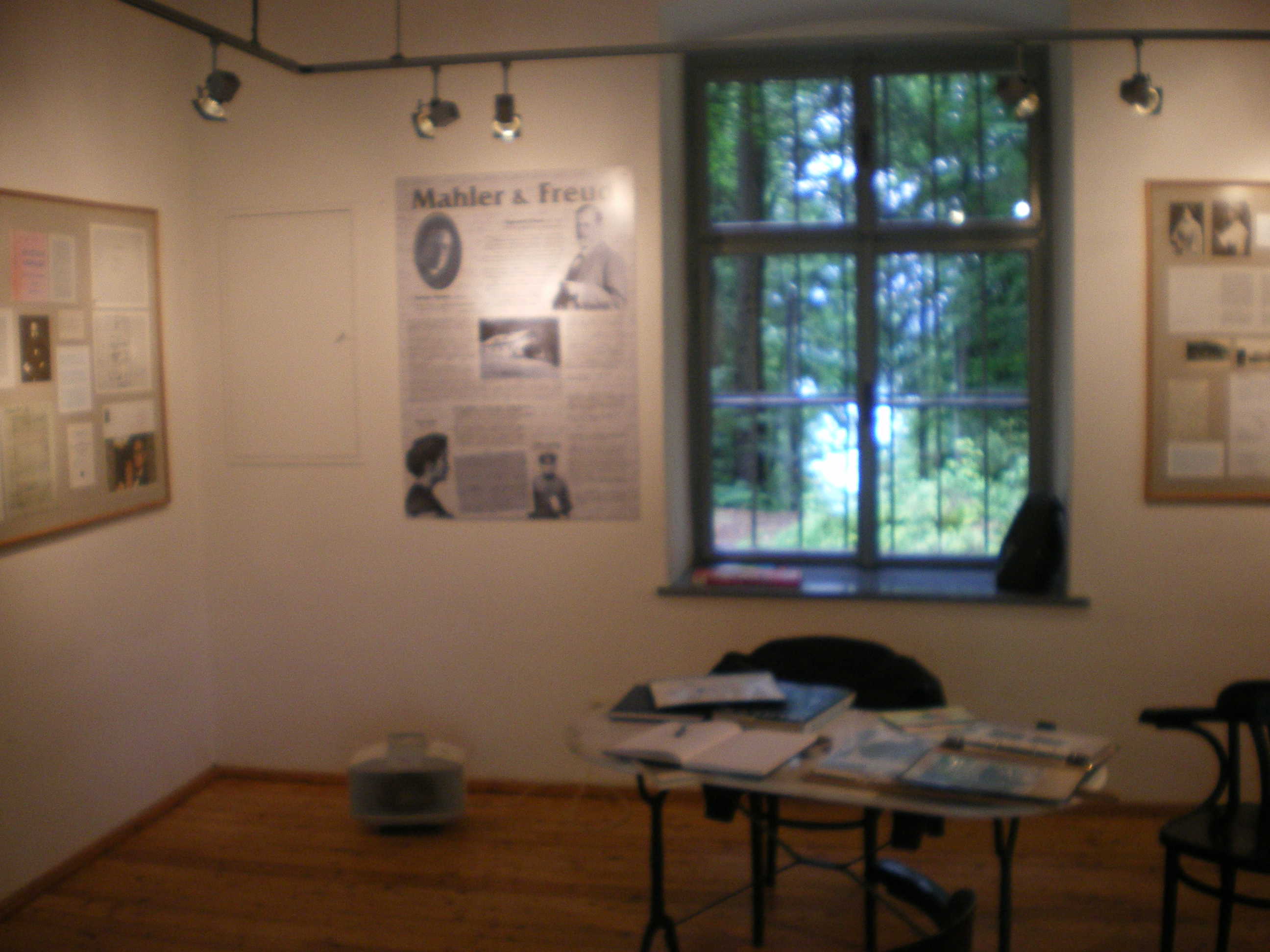

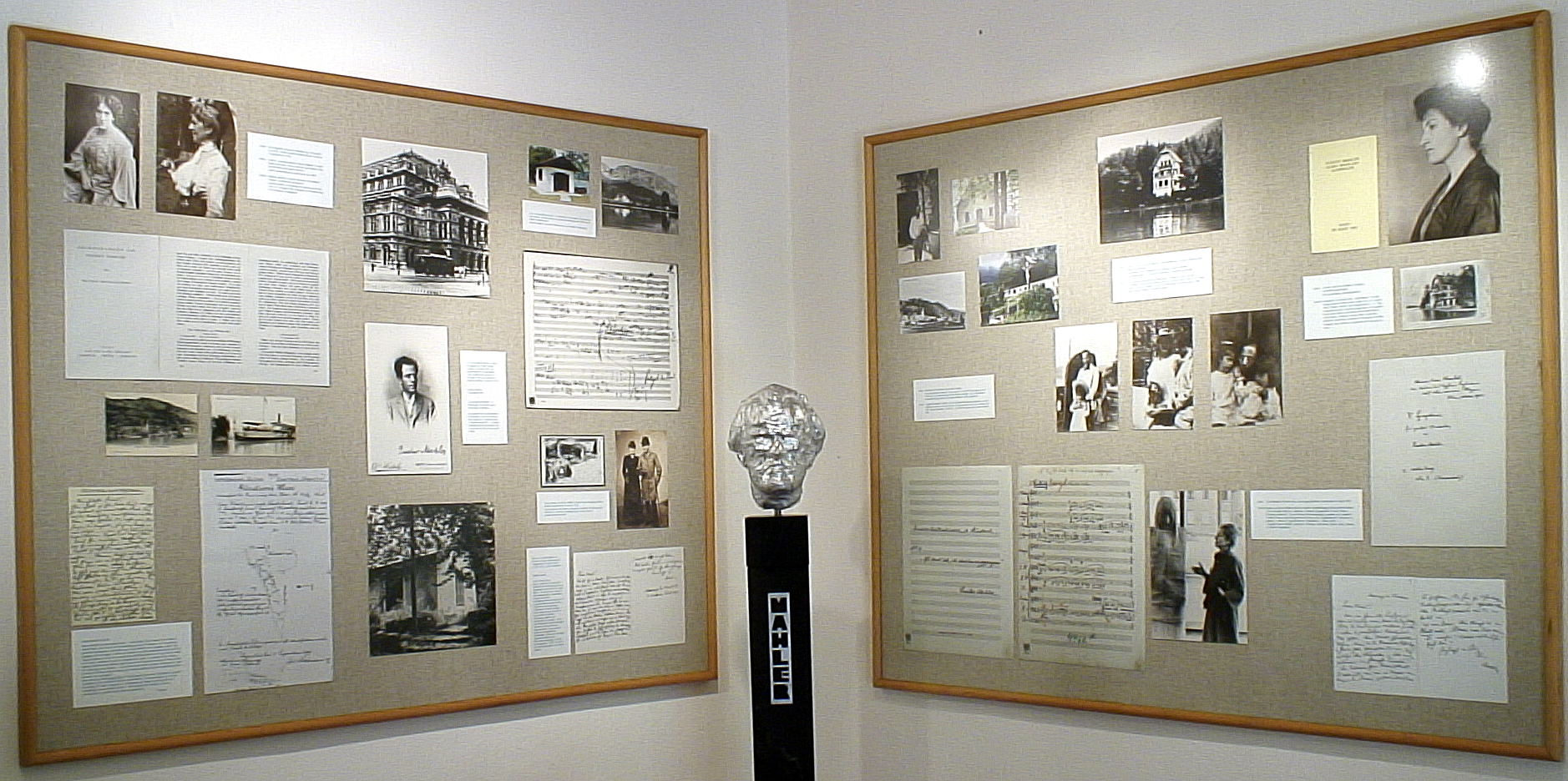
View in the museum (before the renewal of 2016)

== History ==
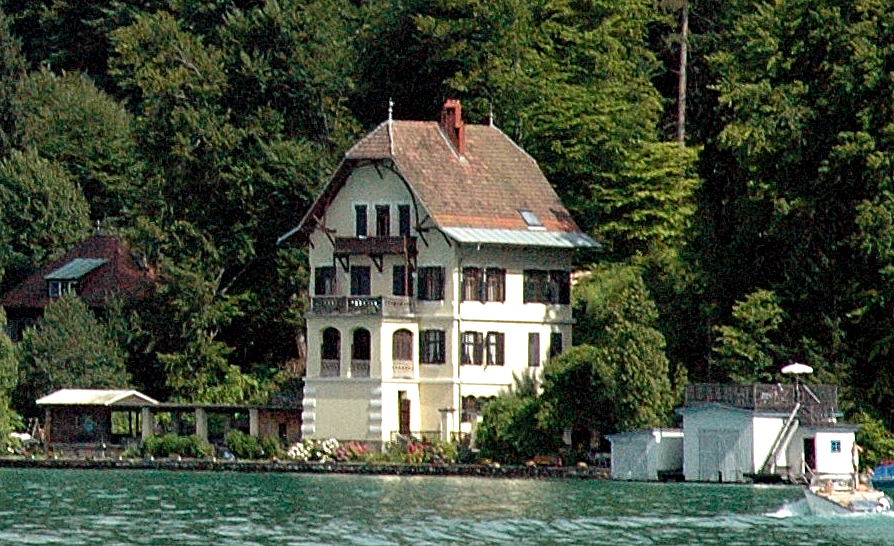
Villa Mahler

Mahler came to Maiernigg in 1900 and had this composing hut built by Friedrich Theuer from 1900 to 1901. He retreated to this hut in order to compose music. At the time, he was director and conductor of the court opera of Vienna (later the Vienna State Opera). The hut was of practical use for Mahler, because there was no time left for him to compose when he was in Vienna. He called the hut Study auf dem Kogel.

In Maiernigg he completed his 4th, 5th, 6th, 7th and parts of 8th Symphony. After his daughter Maria died on 12 July 1907, Mahler left his vacation home and went to Schluderbach in South Tyrol, then still part of Austria, where he spent the rest of his vacation.

The composing hut was declared a cultural heritage in 1981. In 1985, it was renovated by the Gustav Mahler society from Klagenfurt, and was opened on 7 July 1986. This society does not exist anymore, but the composing hut is now being maintained by the city of Klagenfurt. It was renewed once again in 2016.

== See also ==
- List of museums in Austria
- List of music museums
