= Pyramidenkogel =

Mountain in Carinthia, Austria

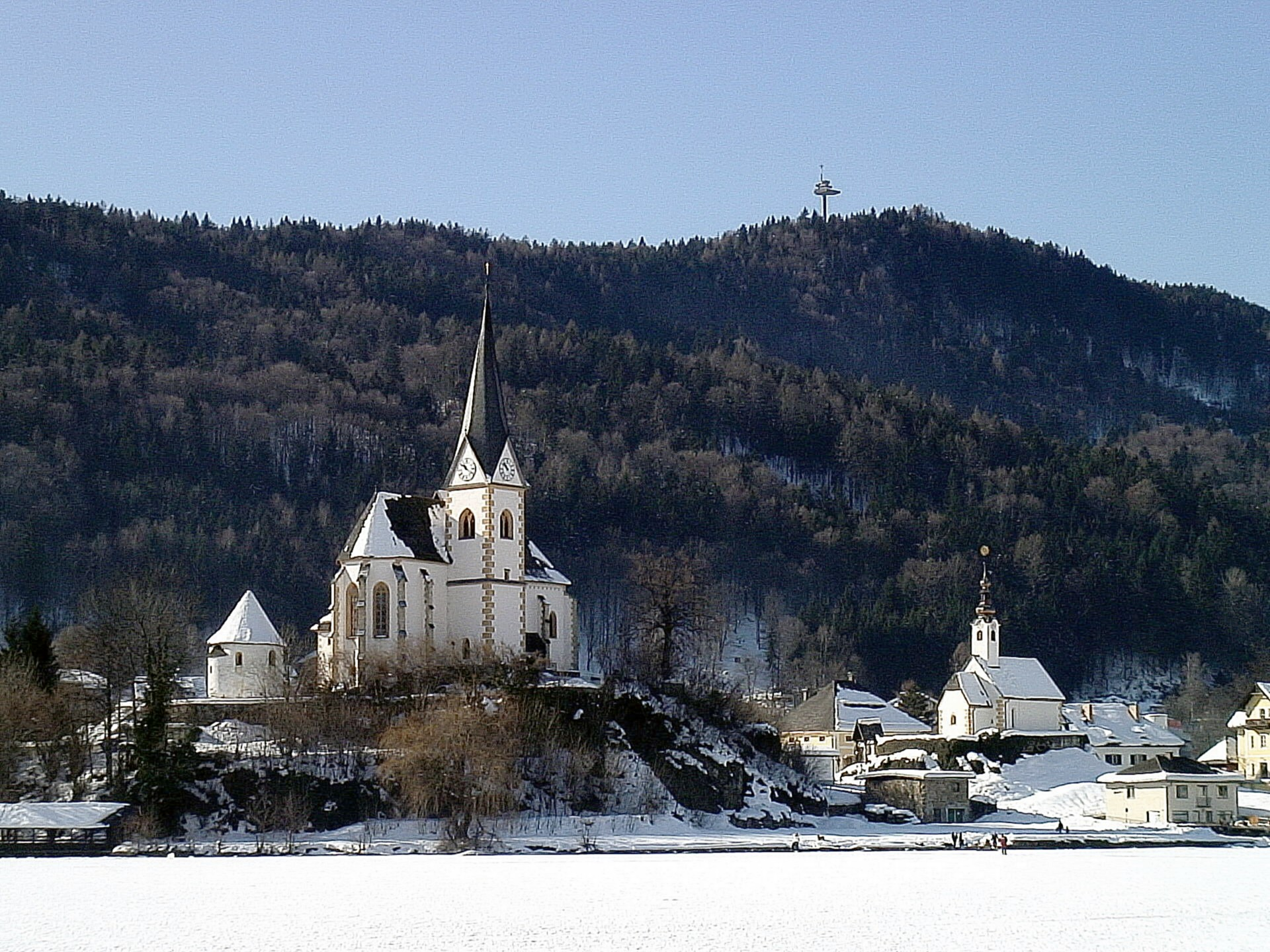
- View of the Pyramidenkogel from Maria Wörth

Highest point
- Elevation: 851 m (2,792 ft)
- Coordinates: 46°36′32″N 14°08′43″E

Geography
- Location within Austria
- Location: Carinthia, Austria

Pyramidenkogel is an 851-metre-high (2,792 ft) mountain in Carinthia, Austria. It is located to the south of the Wörthersee and near the town of Maria Wörth, in an area that is a boundary between speakers of German and Slovenian. The old Slovenian name is Jedvovca. The mountain has been a tourist attraction since at least the late 19th century. The view from its top is mentioned in Karl Baedeker's 1879 The Eastern Alps.

Another mountain named Pyramidenkogel can be found in Austrian Totes Gebirge mountain range. Located south-east of the Almsee, its height is 1961 m.

== Structures on the mountain ==
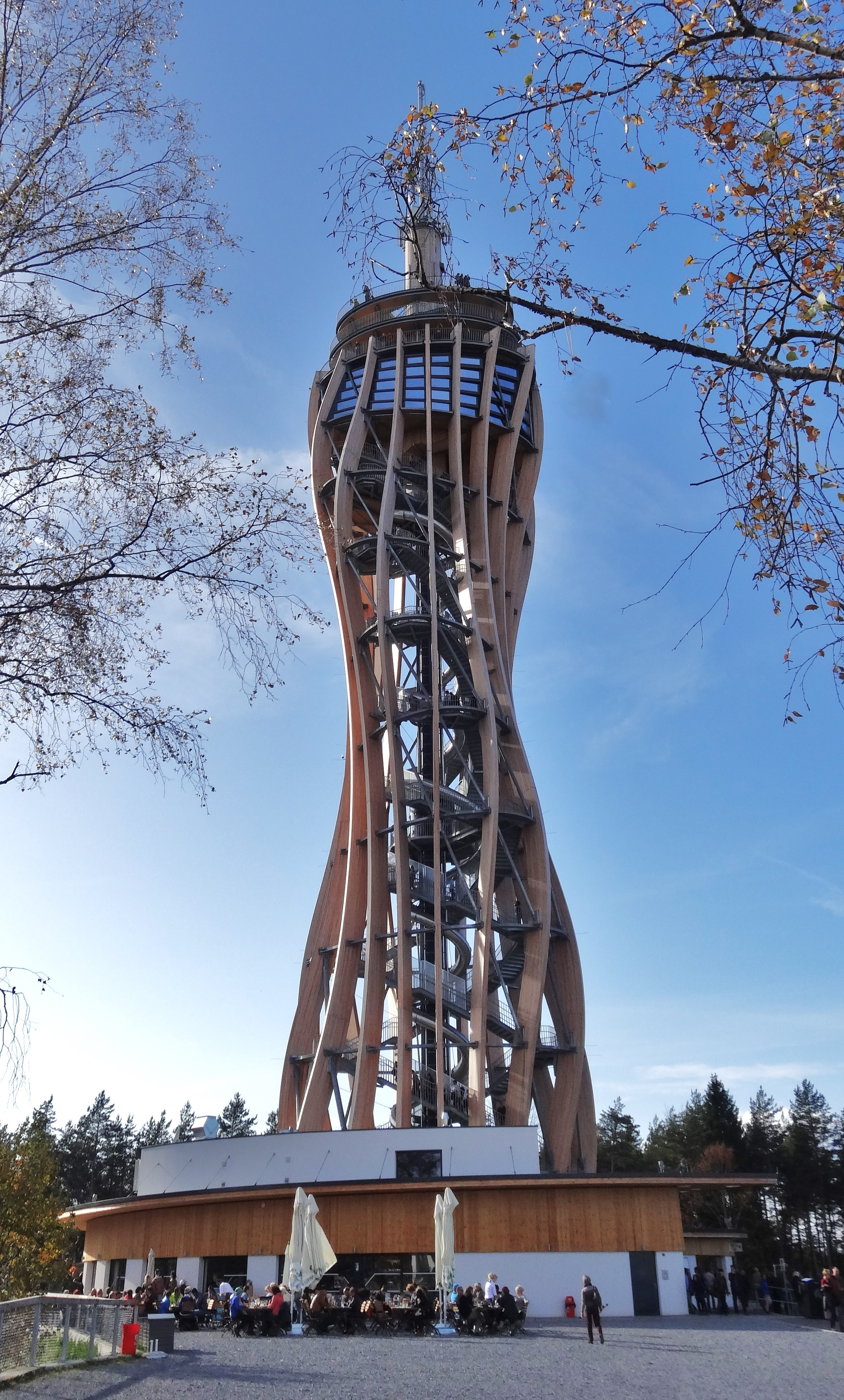
The new Pyramidenkogel Tower

=== First structure and cross ===
A wooden observation platform had been built in 1950, as was a cross to remember the dead of World War I and World War II and "victims of the mountains." The cross was consecrated on 20 August 1950. An annual "Trausteinmesse," a special Mass, is celebrated at the end of summer.

=== First Pyramidekogel Tower (1968–2012) ===
A 54-metre-tall (177 ft) observation and broadcasting tower of steel and concrete, the Pyramidenkogel Tower, was built between 1966 and 1968 and was a well-known "futuristic" tourist attraction, according to the Rough Guide to Austria; Lonely Planet calls it "avant-garde." In 2008, the last summer season before construction of a new edifice, the tower welcomed the five-millionth visitor. The tower was eventually demolished on October 12, 2012.

=== Current tower (2013–present) ===
In July 2006, plans were made to tear down the existing tower and replace it with a new building, a multi-purpose activity centre, which was approved in 2007 and for which the Carinthian government set aside €10 million in 2008. A competition for the new design was started in 2007; the architectural firm of Klaura & Kaden won the competition. Construction was to have begun by late 2008, and the old tower was to be imploded in October 2008, but was postponed and financial and political difficulties prevented any new construction. The demolition was planned once again for September 2010 but was postponed again. The last opening day was on September 30, 2012, and the first existing tower was demolished on October 12, 2012.

The new tower, finished in 2013, was described by Dietmar Kaden as a "Himmelsleiter aus gestapelten Ellipsen," a ladder into heaven made of stacked ellipses, and is to function as a "Leuchtturm der Holzbranche," a lighthouse for the timber industry. No name has been decided on; Markus Klaura has proposed "Isis Noreia," for the goddesses Isis and Noreia (the latter a Germanic deity, the Roman equivalent of Isis).

The new tower is built of wood and steel, and at a height of 100 metres it is the tallest wooden observation tower in the world. Architects Markus Klaura and Dietmar Kaden of Klagenfurt and structural engineer Markus Lackner of Villach have designed a structure which features a visitors platform at 83 metres, a cafe at 70 metres, and a 66-metre-long (217 ft) slide (the longest slide in Europe). The tower is PEFC-certified.

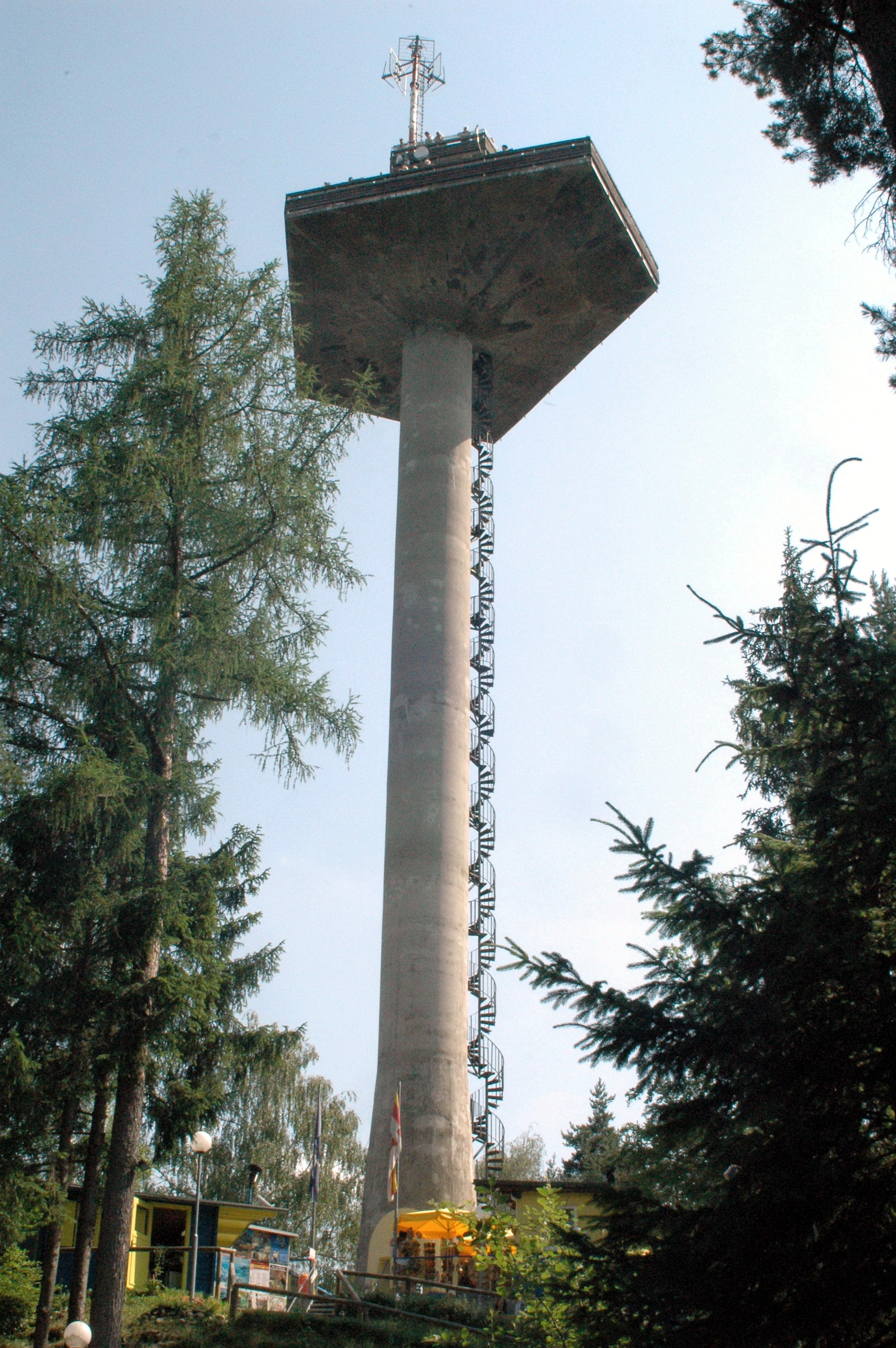
The demolished Pyramidenkogel Tower, built in 1968

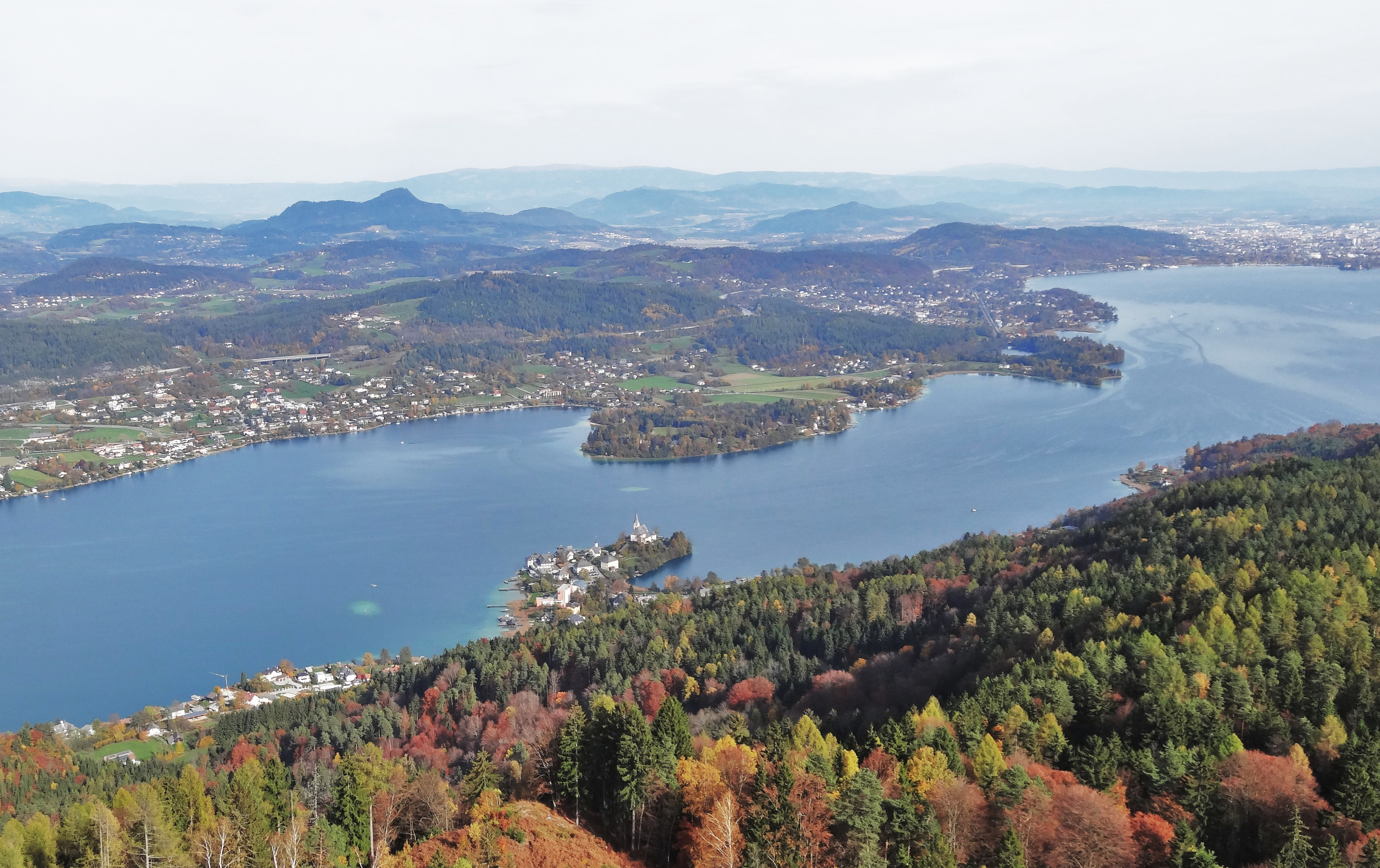
View from the new tower toward the northeast. The lake Wörthersee and Maria Wörth peninsula are clearly visible. Klagenfurt is at right.

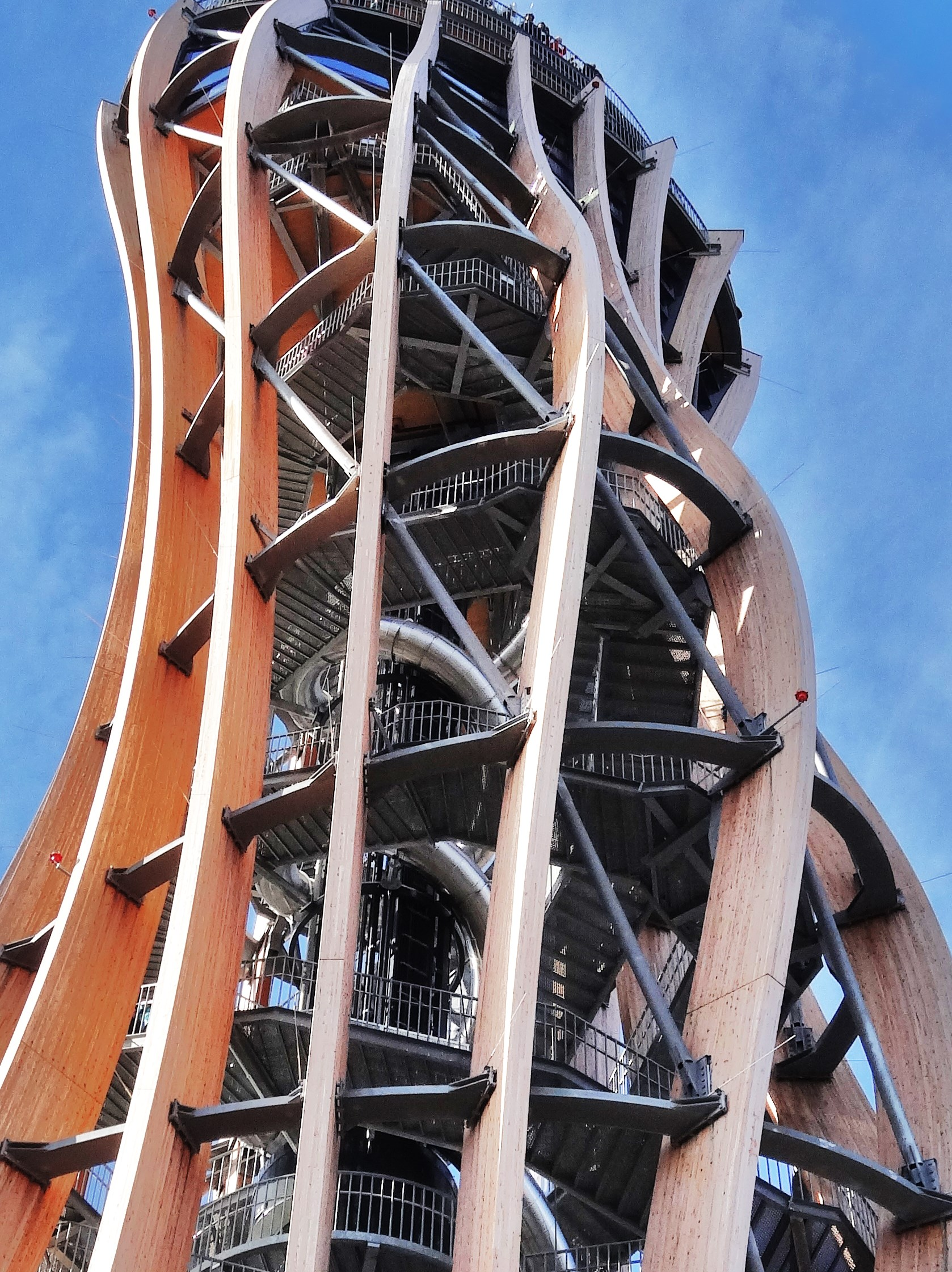
Detail of the tower's wood-steel construction

== See also ==
- List of towers
- List of tallest wooden buildings and structures
