= Gustav Mahler Stube =

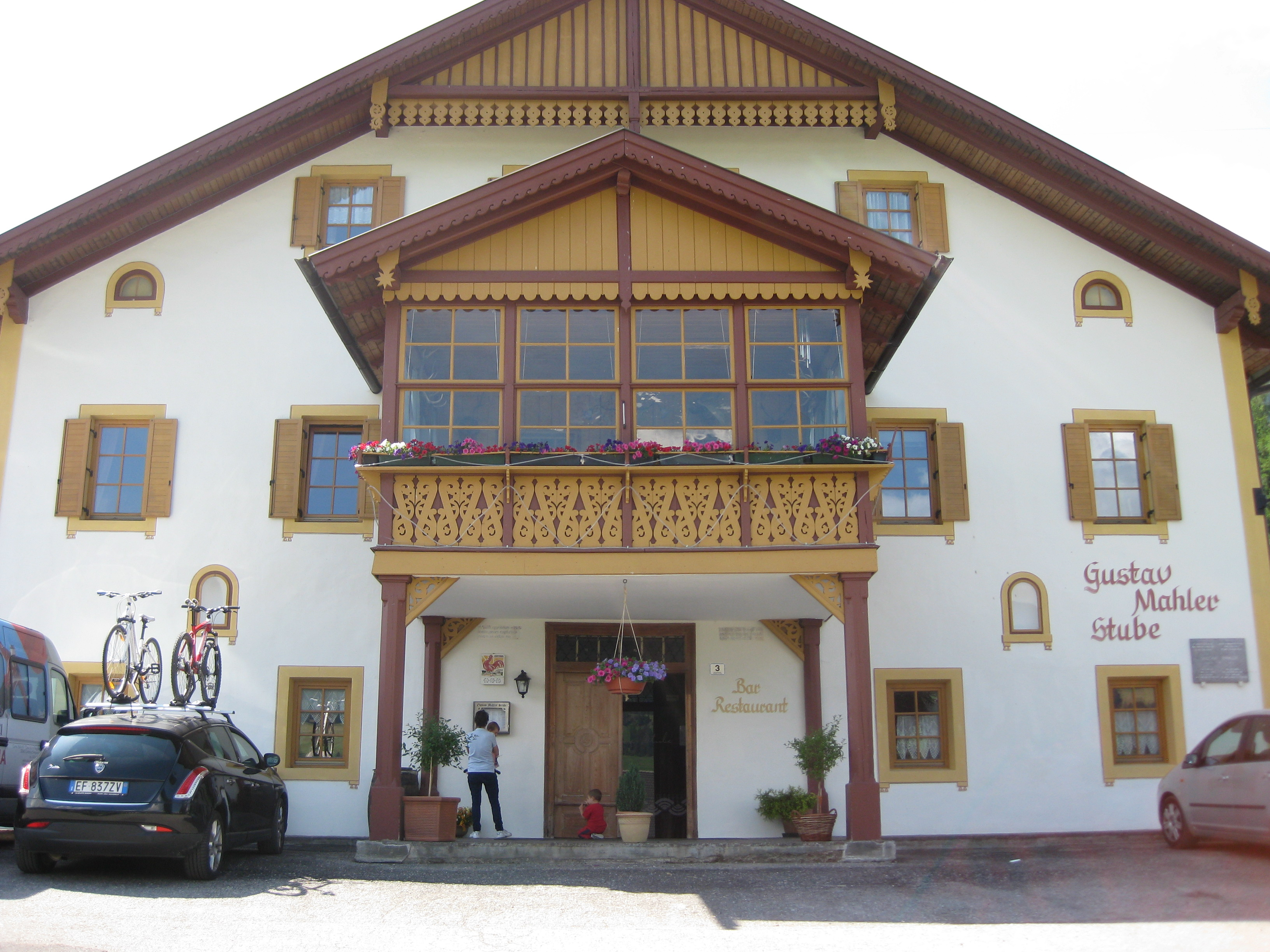
- the Gustav Mahler Stube in 2013

- Location within Italy
- Location: Altschluderbach bei Toblach
- Coordinates: 46°43′41.75″N 12°12′5.508″E
- Type: museum
- Collections: about Gustav Mahler
- Website: www.mahlernaturklangpark.com

The Gustav Mahler Stube, formerly Trenkenhof, is a farmhouse in Altschluderbach, near Toblach in South Tyrol, Italy. It has a restaurant with a Tyrolean cuisine and two apartments. The Stube furthermore manages an animal park with domestic, wild and exotic animals.

The farmhouse is especially known as the former residence of the Austrian composer Gustav Mahler (1860-1911), who stayed here from 1908 to 1910. The first floor was a museum on his life and work. His composing hut is located in the park and is still equipped as a small museum and memorial.

== Gustav Mahler composing hut ==
=== History ===
Mahler and his wife Alma visited the place for the first time in 1907. They lived here in the summer from 1908 to 1910; after his death, she stayed here in 1911 too. After their daughter Putzi died in 1907 at the Wörthersee, where Mahler had previously had his composing hut, they decided not to return there anymore but to live on the first floor of this farmhouse instead. Aside, the wooden little house near Trenkenhof was prepared for Mahler, so he could compose music there.

In Altschluderbach he composed " Das Lied von der Erde", his ninth and (not completed) tenth symphony.

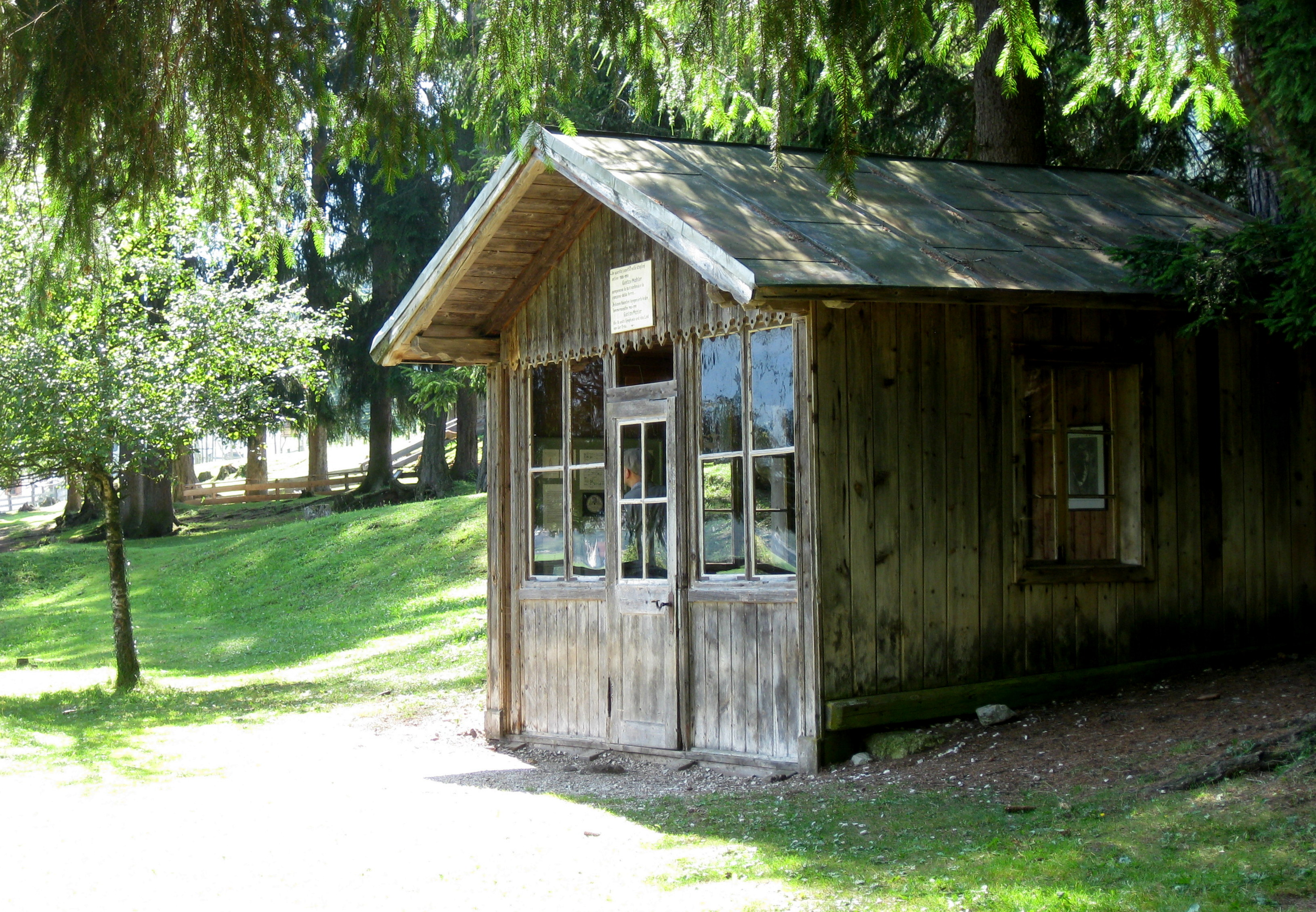

=== Museum ===
The composing hut is a five minute walk from the farmhouse. It was restored in 2022 and is open to the public as a Gustav Mahler nature sound parc.

There are more former composing huts of Mahler that still exist, The composing hut at the Attersee, Upper Austria, and one at the Wörthersee in Carinthia.

== Gustav Mahler Nature Sound Parc ==
Until 2020 the cabin was included in the Gustav Mahler Wild Park. The new project includes a direct access to the cabin within a Nature Sound Park. Restoration of the cabin started autumn 2021 and finished 2022. The property is private. The surrounding is open in summer and it is called Mahler sound parc to listen to the silence of nature that gave Inspiration to Mahler. Some guide visits of the inside of the cabin are organized during the year. www.mahlernaturklangpark.com
