= Composing hut of Gustav Mahler (Attersee) =

Biographical museum in Steinbach am Attersee, Austria

- Gustav Mahler-Komponierhäuschen
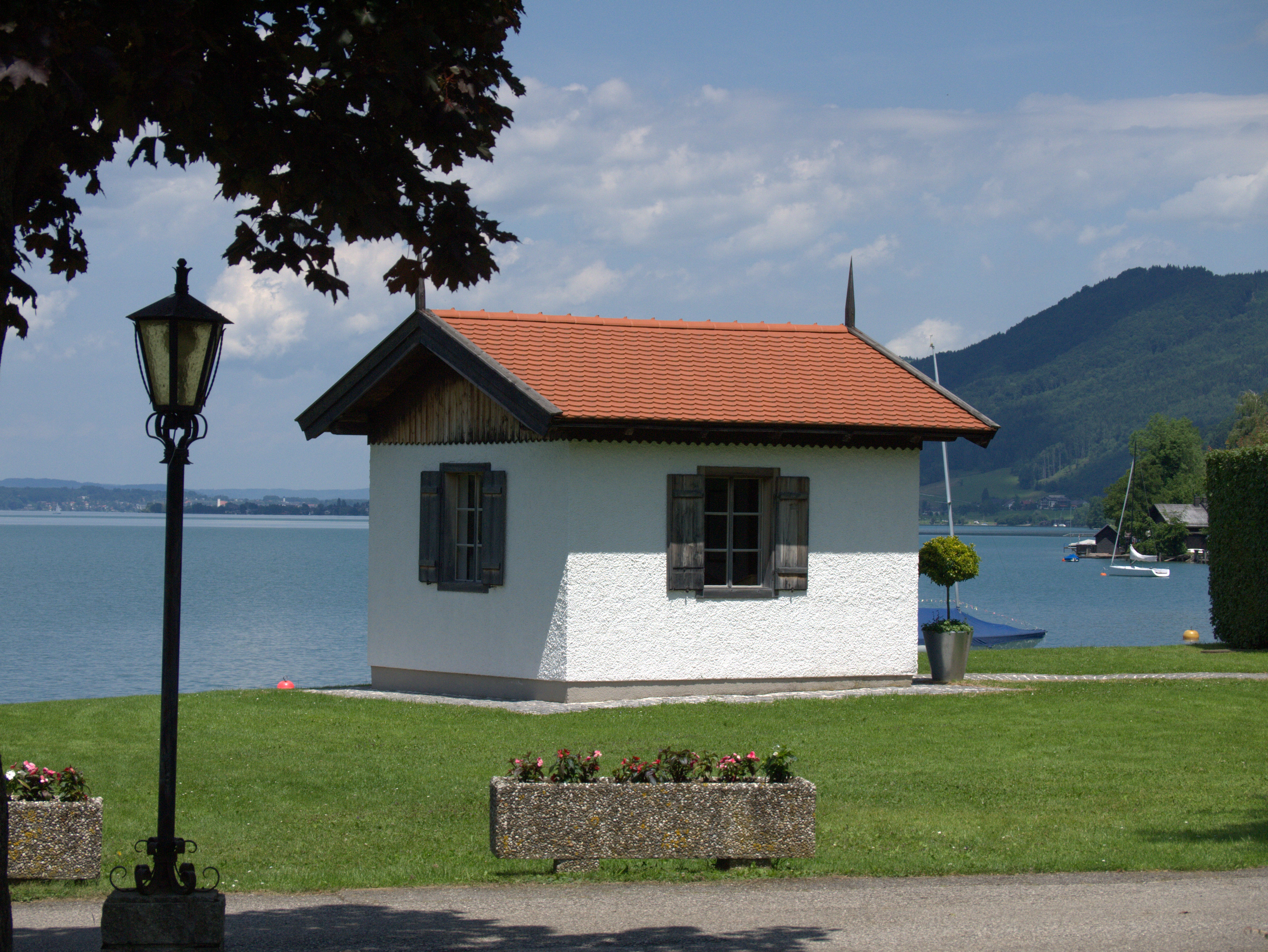
- image of 2013

- Location within Austria
- Established: 1985
- Location: Seefeld 14, Steinbach am Attersee
- Coordinates: 47°50′26.32″N 13°32′41.5″E
- Type: biographical museum
- Collections: about Gustav Mahler
- Architect: Johann Lösch
- Website: brochure

The composing hut of Gustav Mahler, German: Gustav Mahler-Komponierhäuschen, is a little museum and memorial in Steinbach at lake Attersee in Upper Austria. It is dedicated to the classical composer Gustav Mahler (1860–1911). In this hut he retreated from 1893 to 1896 in order to compose music. Since 1985 a permanent exhibition can be seen here.

Other composing huts of Mahler still exist as well. One can be found at lake Wörthersee, also in Austria, and there is one next to the Gustav Mahler Stube in South Tyrol, Italy.

== Collection ==
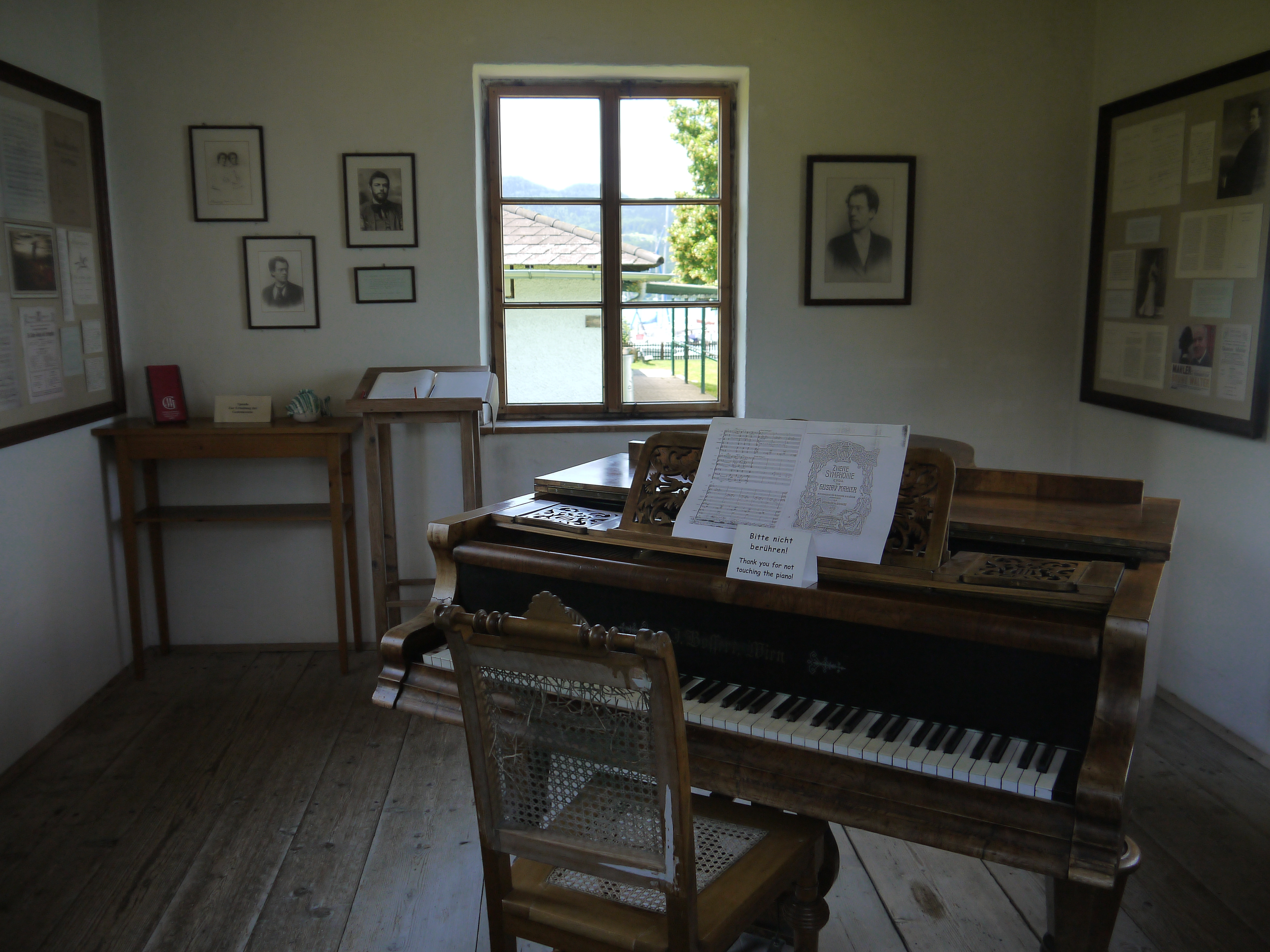
Mahler's piano

Since 1985 Mahler's former composing hut shows a permanent exhibition. In the first decades, Mahler's piano, photographs, music sheets and original documents were exhibited.

In 2016 the presentation was renewed by the International Gustav Mahler Society. The society chose for a scientifically justified presentation, and introduced multimedia techniques that year.

The presentation consists of six wall displays, with 1) a chronology of the life of Gustav Mahler, 2) Attersee and Mahler's years there (1893-1896), 3) nature, people and Des Knaben Wunderhorn, 4) the construction of the hut, and 5–6) Mahler's second and third symphony.

== History ==
In 1893, Mahler was kapellmeister in the city theatre of Hamburg. In that year he came to Steinbach for his first time, together with his sister Justine and a friend of the family, Natalie Bauer-Lechner. They booked five rooms in Gasthaus zum Höllengebirge to pass their vacation here. The natural environment inspired Mahler to compose two symphonies and a dozen songs. To be able to work in peace, he had this composing hut built in 1894 by Johann Lösch. There were three windows, and Mahler had a chair, table, stove and a piano at his possession.

After he left, the hut remained constantly used for other activities. It has been used as a washing house, sanitary facility and slaughterhouse. In 1985 neglect and destruction were prevented, when it was renovated to house a permanent exhibition.

== See also ==
- List of museums in Austria
- List of music museums
