= Reinhold Kubik =

Reinhold Kubik (March 22 1942 – May 25 2024, Vienna) was an Austrian musicologist, pianist and conductor.

== Biography ==
From 1966 to 1974, Kubik worked as a repetiteur, coach, and Kapellmeister at the Deutsche Oper am Rhein in Düsseldorf and Duisburg. From 1974 to 1980, Kubik did research for a PhD on Handel's Rinaldo at Erlangen. He was also a pianist, composer, choir director and lecturer. Kubik was editor-in-chief of Hänssler Verlag and has worked at Universal Edition Wien. He taught at the University of Music and Performing Arts Vienna, in Nuremberg, Karlsruhe, London, and at Yale University.

Kubik was married to the Baroque scholar, singer and dance pedagogue Margit Legler. Legler and Kubik jointly wrote about and presented productions related to Baroque music, dance, and theatre.

== IGMG tenure ==
From 1993 to 2012, Kubik was editor-in-chief of the Critical Complete Edition of the Works of Gustav Mahler and vice president of the Internationale Gustav Mahler Gesellschaft (IGMG; International Gustav Mahler Society). Several controversial episodes ensued over editions of Mahler's Symphony No. 1 and Symphony No. 6 issued during his tenure.

=== Symphony No. 1 ===
In the IGMG edition of the Symphony No. 1 edited by Sander Wilkens (1992, revised 1995), Wilkens had stated that the 3rd-movement double bass solo was instead meant for the full unison double bass section of the orchestra to perform, rather than by a solo double bass player, in contraindication to past published manuscripts and performance traditions. This statement occasioned criticism for Wilkens' inaccurate reading of the manuscripts, to the point where Kubik later repudiated Wilkens' misreading of the double bass solo:

"However, assigning the new edition of the First Symphony to Sander Wilkens unfortunately proved to be a mistake. His confused arguments in support of the claim that the famous double bass solo at the beginning of the third movement was a solo for the whole group rather than for a single player contradicted the sources and surviving reports of performances under Mahler’s direction, and exposed the Critical Edition to ridicule from all Mahler researchers"

=== Symphony No. 6 ===
With respect to the Symphony No. 6, Kubik presided over the 2010 edition published by the IGMG, which featured the inner movements in the order Andante-Scherzo. Kubik had earlier declared in print in 2004:

"As the current Chief Editor of the Complete Critical Edition, I declare the official position of the institution I represent is that the correct order of the middle movements of Mahler's Sixth Symphony is Andante-Scherzo."

This statement has received criticism for multiple reasons, which include:
(a) its blanket dismissal of the original score with the Scherzo/Andante order,
(b) its expression of a personal preference without documentary evidence and based on subjective animus related to the Alma Problem,
(c) for imposing an advance bias instead of presenting objectively, without preconceived bias, the two options of Scherzo/Andante and Andante/Scherzo.

Mahler scholar Herta Blaukopf rebutted this judgment without personal criticism of Kubik:

'...in this question there is certainly no "correct" or "incorrect", no "right" or "wrong" – at best there is only an "in the end". Mahler's symphonies were subjected to minor and major revisions and developments as many times as they were performed. We can, therefore, refer only to the last state of his thoughts on the matter. What must be considered is that which is revealed by historical documents and that which is revealed by the music itself.'

Mahler scholar and biographer Henry-Louis de la Grange has written about Kubik's general judgment, without personal criticism:

"The fact that the initial order had the composer's stamp of approval for two whole years prior to the premiere argues for further performances in that form...

It is far more likely ten years after Mahler's death and with a much clearer perspective on his life and career, Alma would have sought to be faithful to his artistic intentions. Thus, her telegram of 1919 still remains a strong argument today in favour of Mahler's original order...it is stretching the bounds of both language and reason to describe [Andante-Scherzo] as the "only correct" one. Mahler's Sixth Symphony, like many other compositions in the repertory, will always remain a "dual-version" work, but few of the others have attracted quite as much controversy."

Music writer David Hurwitz has likewise written on Kubik's subjective bias towards a single choice, instead of granting performers latitude to make their own choice without advance bias:

"...the responsible thing to do in revisiting the need for a new Critical Edition would be to set out all of the arguments on each side, and then take no position. Let the performers decide, and admit frankly that if the criterion for making a decision regarding the correct order of the inner movements must be what Mahler himself ultimately wanted, then no final answer is possible. This is the only honest approach, and it would be no different than what many of the better Critical Editions do — consider for example Philip Gossett’s editions of Rossini and Verdi operas, which attempt to present all significant, legitimate variant readings to the performer as long as they originate with the composer (or have his express sanction)...

"The danger in making the sort of dubious claims to definitiveness that we find in the current edition lies not just in the fact that to do so is simply bad scholarship; it also fails to take into account the practical reality that many busy performers today likely will accept these specious arguments without qualms.

"It falls to a Critical Edition, then, to encourage interpreters to come to a work without preconceptions, and to offer a clean text alongside a fair assessment of the various interpretive options that the composer left open to posterity."

Hurwitz also notes Kubik's dismissal of the existence of the original version in the pronouncement:

"...scholars rightly often give particular weight to a composer’s original conception, especially if it can be shown that later alterations resulted from extraneous or non‐musical considerations and circumstances. This is arguably the case here. It explains why Kubik’s preface contains repeated, and to be frank strikingly defensive, assertions concerning the definitiveness of Mahler’s intentions in placing the Andante second. 'Mahler never played the symphony any other way,' they remind us, over and over, as if the sheer weight of irrelevant historical detail that they have accumulated concerning the three performances that Mahler actually conducted will enhance its value and make us forget the simple truth regarding the work's actual performance history.

Accordingly, not a word of the rhetorical smokescreen that Kubik works so hard to erect makes the slightest impact on the fact that there are very strong reasons for preferring Mahler's original movement order on purely formal grounds. Accordingly, it pays to consider the issue from this perspective as well, even if Kubik and his team will not because it's an argument they cannot win (and they probably know it)."

== Publications ==
- Helmut Brenner, Reinhold Kubik: Mahlers Menschen. Freunde und Weggefährten. Residenz-Verlag, St. Pölten/Salzburg/Wien 2014, ISBN 978-3-7017-3322-4.
- Händels Rinaldo. Geschichte, Werk, Wirkung. Hänssler, Neuhausen-Stuttgart 1982, ISBN 3-7751-0594-8.
