= Maria Wörth =

- Municipality
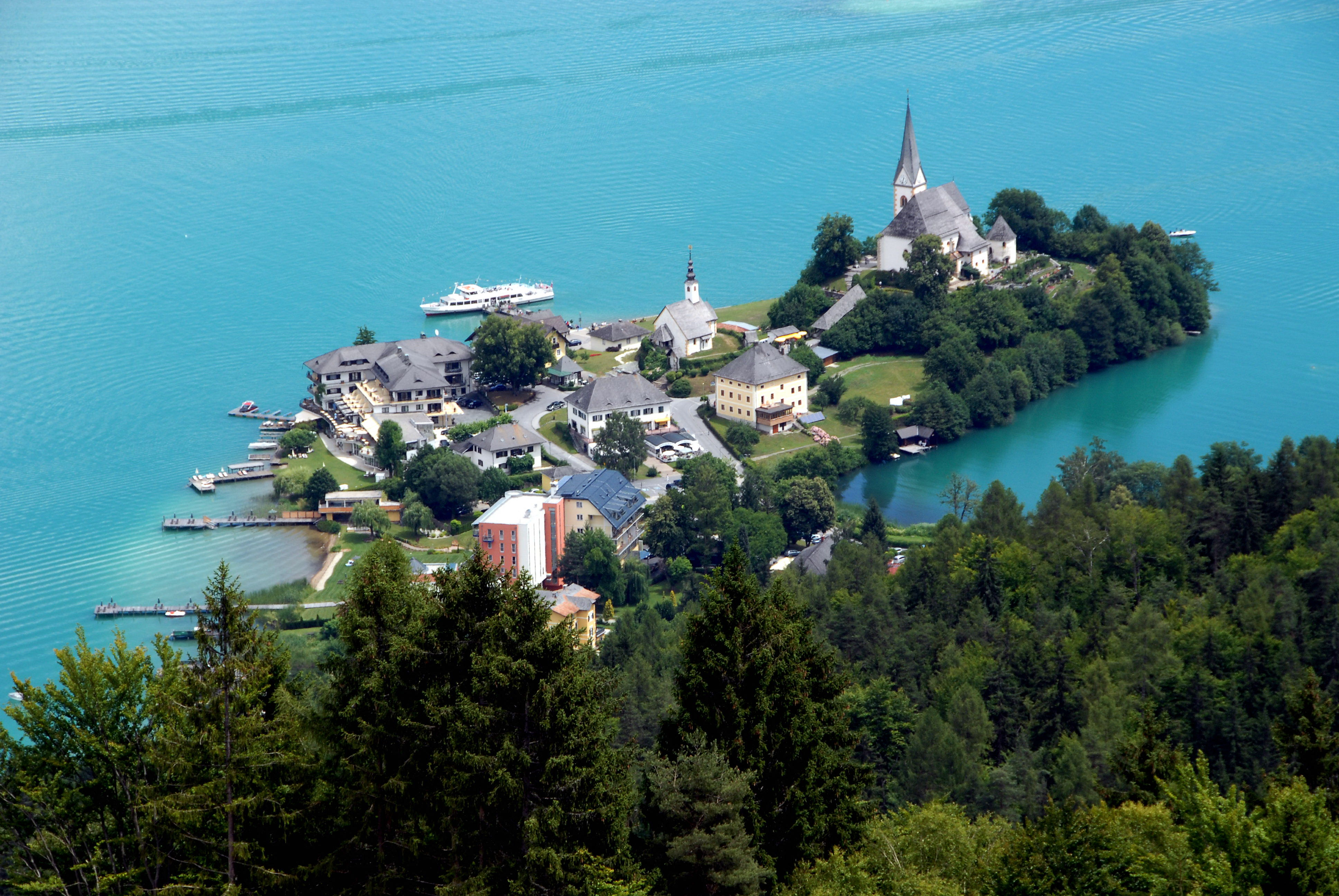

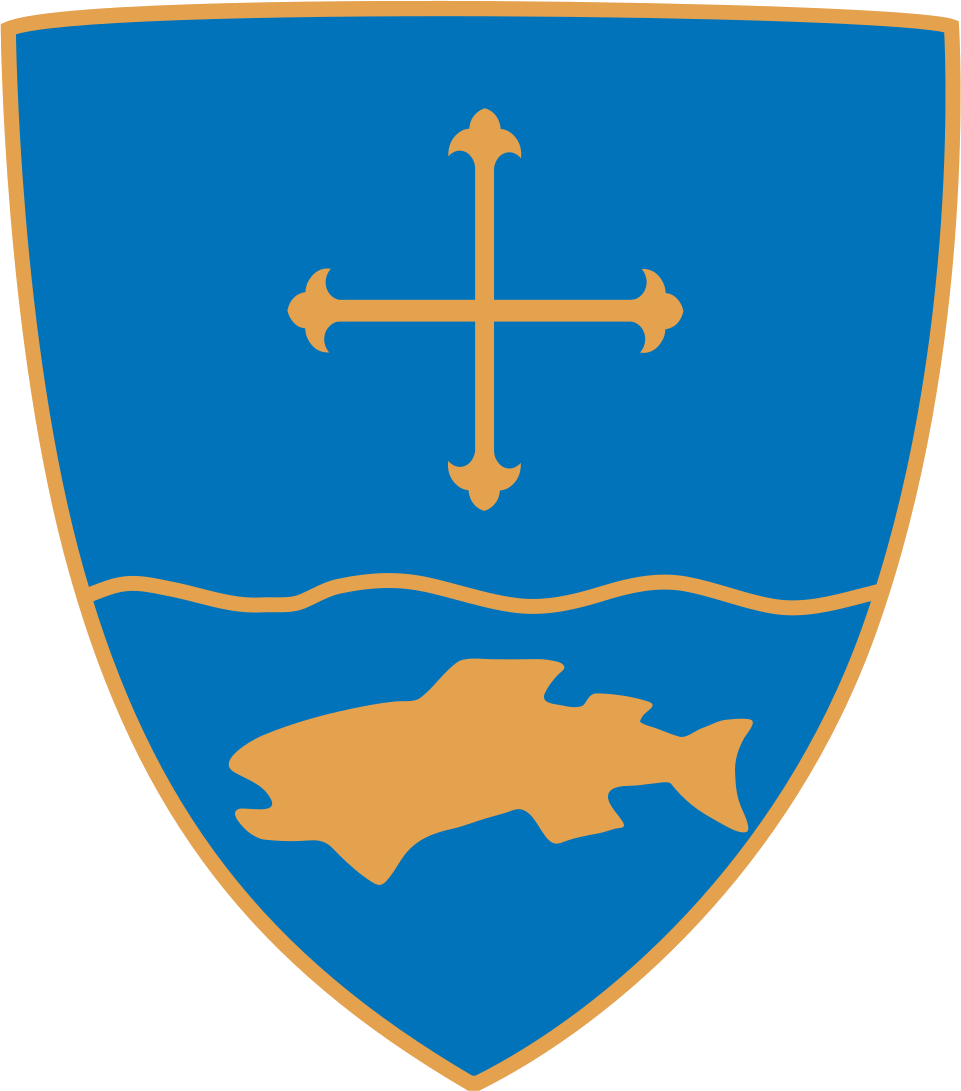
- Coat of arms

- Location within Austria
- Coordinates: 46°37′N 14°10′E
- Country: Austria
- State: Carinthia
- District: Klagenfurt-Land

Government
  - Mayor: Markus Perdacher (ÖVP)

Area
  - Total: 17.39 km^{2} (6.71 sq mi)
- Elevation: 450 m (1,480 ft)

Population (2018-01-01)
  - Total: 1,611
  - Density: 92.64/km^{2} (239.9/sq mi)
- Time zone: UTC+1 (CET)
  - Summer (DST): UTC+2 (CEST)
- Postal code: 9081
- Area code: 04273
- Website: www.maria-woerth.info

Maria Wörth (Slovene: Otok) is a municipality in the district of Klagenfurt-Land in the Austrian state of Carinthia. The centre of the resort town is situated on a peninsula at the southern shore of the Wörthersee. In the east, the municipal area borders the Carinthian capital Klagenfurt. The municipality consists of the two Katastralgemeinden Maria Wörth and Reifnitz.

== History ==
A first St. Mary's Church was erected in about 875 during the Christianization in former Carantania, led by the Bishops of Freising based at Innichen Abbey. It was first mentioned in an 894 deed as Maria Werd—because the site was at that time an island. (The Old High German term Wörth or Werder, like the Slovene Otok, denotes a piece of land surrounded by water.) The church served for the translation of the relics of Saints Primus and Felician and played an important role within the Christian mission in the Duchy of Carinthia.

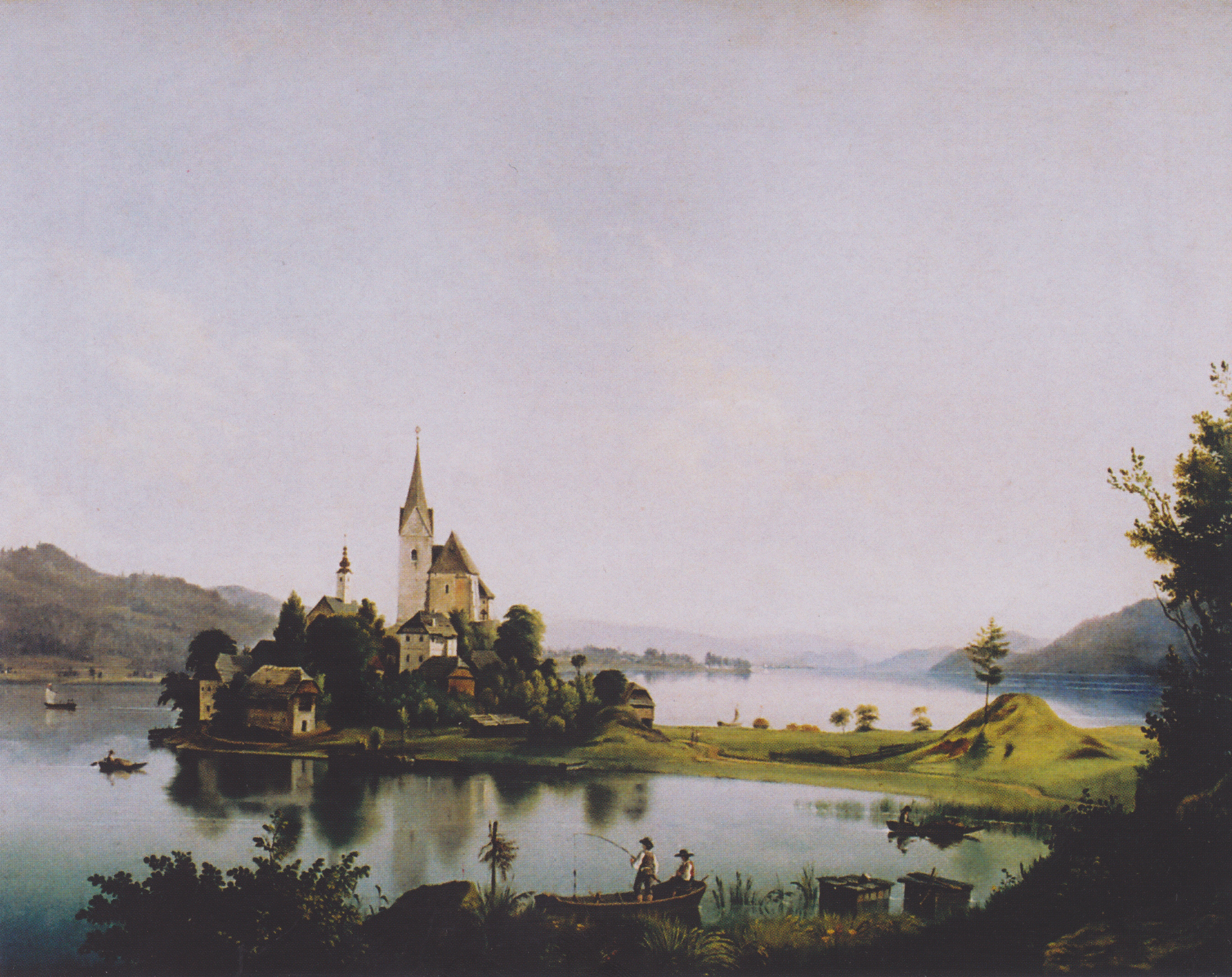
Maria Wörth, painting by Markus Pernhart (1824–1871)

In about 1150 Bishop Otto of Freising founded a college of canons here, and had the small Winterkirche chapel built beside the collegiate church. In 1399 both churches were destroyed by fire, and afterwards rebuilt in the present late Gothic style. The Freising Prince-Bishops gradually lost their influence in Carinthia, and about 1500 the college finally became an annex of Millstatt Abbey, led from 1598 by Jesuits.

With the Suppression of the Society of Jesus in 1773, Millstatt Abbey was dissolved and Maria Wörth passed to the re-established Bendectine St. Paul's Abbey in the Lavanttal in 1809. Not until 1903 the present-day municipality was established on territory of neighbouring Schiefling and Keutschach.

== Sights ==
Maria Wörth is a centre of Austrian and European summer tourism, with 330,000 arrivals (although these numbers have declined sharply since the 1950s). Today's parish church Saints Primus and Felician stands on the highest point of the peninsula, with the neighbouring Winterkirche beneath it. It is a major pilgrimage site and, due to its romantic setting, a popular wedding church. Another tourist attraction is the nearby Pyramidenkogel, an 851-meter high mountain with a 54-meter high observation platform, the Pyramidenkogel Tower.

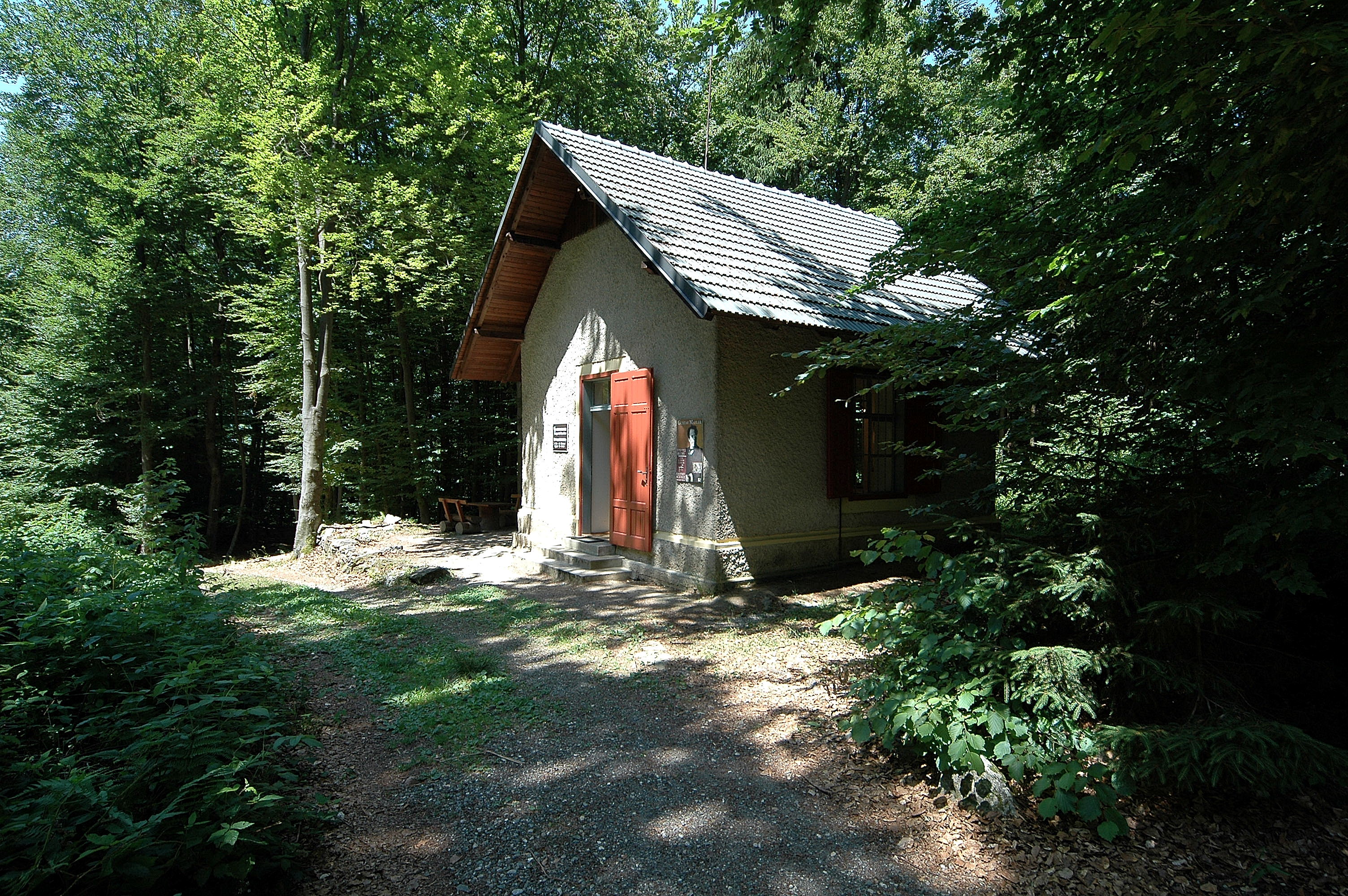
Mahler's composing hut

In 1901 the composer Gustav Mahler built a villa near the hamlet of Maiernigg, on the lakeside in the east of the municipality, where he was already using a "composing hut" in which most of his works written between 1900 and 1907 were composed, including his Symphonies No. 5-8. The hut is now open as a small museum. Through his friendship with Alma Mahler, the composer's widow, Alban Berg also composed at Maiernigg, which was visited by many of the Viennese artistic elite.

== Notable people ==
- Adolf Heinrich Bercht, (German Wiki) (1875 - 1940) was owner of Schloss Reifnitz, (German Wiki) and mayor of the capital of federal state of Carinthia, Klagenfurt between 1926 and 1931. He is interred in the Bercht family grave in Maria Wörth.

== Twin towns ==
- Freising, Germany
- Codroipo, Italy
- Aretxabaleta, Basque Country, Spain
