= Symphony No. 6 (Mahler) =

Symphony by Gustav Mahler

- Tragic
- by Gustav Mahler
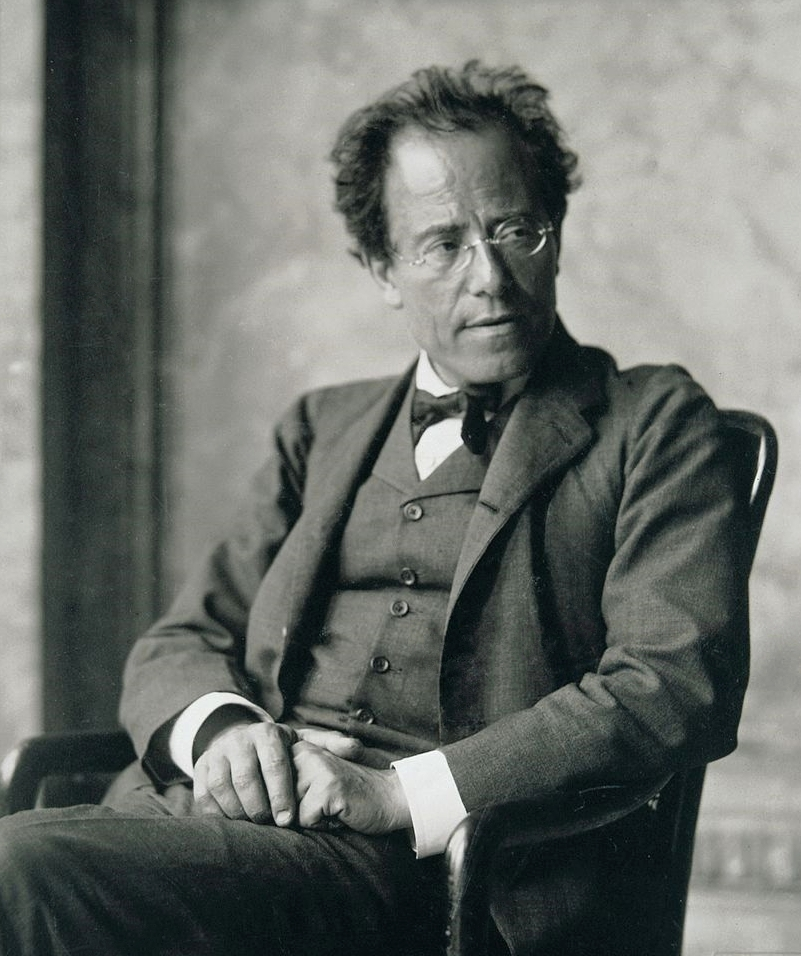
- Gustav Mahler in 1907
- Key: A minor
- Composed: 1903–1904: Maiernigg
- Published: 1906 C. F. Kahnt (original edition); 1906 C. F. Kahnt (revised edition)
- Recorded: F. Charles Adler, Vienna Symphony, 1952
- Duration: 77–90 minutes
- Movements: 4

Premiere
- Date: 27 May 1906
- Location: Saalbau Essen
- Conductor: Gustav Mahler

The Symphony No. 6 in A minor by Gustav Mahler is a symphony in four movements, composed in 1903 and 1904, with revisions from 1906. It is sometimes nicknamed the Tragic ("Tragische"), though the origin of the nickname remains unresolved.

Mahler conducted the work's first performance at the Saalbau concert hall in Essen on 27 May 1906. He composed the symphony during an exceptionally happy time in his life, as he had married Alma Schindler in 1902, and during the course of the work's composition, his second daughter was born. This contrasts with the tragic, even nihilistic, ending of the symphony. Both Alban Berg and Anton Webern praised the work when they first heard it. Berg expressed his opinion of the stature of this symphony in a 1908 letter to Webern:

Es gibt doch nur eine VI. trotz der Pastorale. [There is only one Sixth, notwithstanding the Pastoral.]

== Nickname of Tragische ==
The status of the symphony's nickname is problematic due to its lost history. Mahler did not title the symphony when he composed it, when it was first performed or when it was first published. When he allowed Richard Specht to analyse the work and Alexander von Zemlinsky to arrange the symphony, he did not authorize any sort of nickname for it. He had, as well, decisively rejected and disavowed the titles (and programmes) of his earlier symphonies by 1900. Only the words "Sechste Sinfonie" (Sixth Symphony) appeared on the programme for the performance in Munich on 8 November 1906. Nor does the word Tragische appear on any of the scores that C. F. Kahnt published (first edition, 1906; revised edition, 1906), in Specht's officially approved Thematische Führer ('thematic guide') or on Zemlinsky's piano duet transcription (1906). By contrast, in his Gustav Mahler memoir, Bruno Walter claimed that "Mahler called [the work] his Tragic Symphony". Additionally, the programme for the first Vienna performance (4 January 1907) refers to the work as "Sechste Sinfonie (Tragische)".

Although not using the title, Alma Mahler's famous statement has influenced the association of the symphony with tragedy:

in the last movement, Mahler described himself and his downfall, or as he later said, that of his hero. "It is the hero on whom fall three blows of fate, the last of which fells him, as a tree is felled." Those were his words.

== Instrumentation ==
The symphony is scored for a very large orchestra, the largest purely instrumental forces Mahler ever wrote for, consisting of the following:

Woodwinds
piccolo (used only in movement 4)
4 flutes (3rd and 4th doubling 2nd and 3rd piccolos)
4 oboes (3rd and 4th doubling 2nd and 3rd cor anglais; 2nd cor anglais used only in Scherzo)
cor anglais (used only in movement 4)
E♭ clarinet (doubling 4th clarinet)
3 B♭ and A clarinets
bass clarinet
4 bassoons (4th used only in movement 4)
contrabassoon
Brass
8 horns
6 trumpets (5th and 6th used only in movement 4)
4 trombones (4th used only in movement 4)
tuba
Keyboards
celesta (doubled or tripled if possible)

Percussion
6 timpani (two players)
bass drum
2 snare drums (used in movements 1 and 4)
several pairs of crash cymbals
suspended cymbals
several triangles
cowbells (offstage in movements 1 and 4, onstage in Andante)
hammer (see description below)
2 tam-tams (standard and deep)
rute (to be struck on the bass drum case, used only in movement 4)
small wooden stick (to be struck on the bass drum case, used only in the scherzo)
deep, untuned bells (used only in movement 4, offstage)
glockenspiel
xylophone
Strings
4 harps
1st violins
2nd violins
violas
cellos
double basses

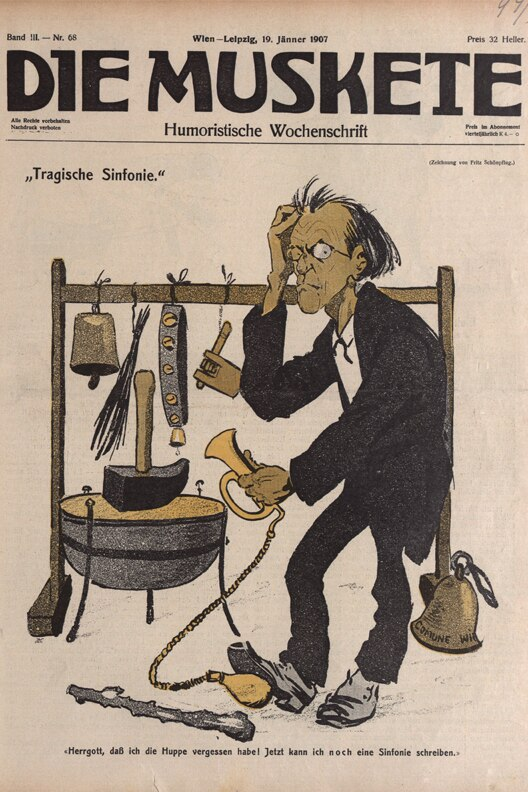
Contemporary caricature about the unorthodox usage of a hammer: "My god, I forgot the car horn! Now I can write another symphony." (Die Muskete, 19 January 1907)

Listed above is the full, original orchestration of the sixth symphony. The critical edition does not account for everything listed, especially regarding the very large percussion section. The number of harps specified is ambiguous; Mahler called for two in his list of instruments, but at one point he called for four harps in the score. Due to costs, however, most performances use only two.

In addition to very large woodwind and brass sections, Mahler augmented the percussion section with several unusual instruments, including untuned bells, offstage cowbells, and the famous "Mahler hammer". The sound of the hammer, which features in the last movement, was stipulated by Mahler to be "brief and mighty, but dull in resonance and with a non-metallic character (like the fall of an axe)." The sound achieved in the premiere did not quite carry far enough from the stage, and indeed the problem of achieving the proper volume while still remaining dull in resonance remains a challenge to the modern orchestra. Various methods of producing the sound have involved a wooden mallet striking a wooden surface, a sledgehammer striking a wooden box, or a particularly large bass drum, or sometimes simultaneous use of more than one of these methods. Contemporaries mocked the use of the hammer, as shown by a caricature from the satirical magazine Die Muskete.

== Structure ==
The work is in four movements and has a duration of around 80 minutes. The order of the inner movements has been a matter of controversy. The first published edition of the score (C. F. Kahnt, 1906) featured the movements in the following order:

1. Allegro energico, ma non troppo. Heftig, aber markig.
2. Scherzo: Wuchtig
3. Andante moderato
4. Finale: Sostenuto – Allegro moderato – Allegro energico

Mahler later placed the Andante as the second movement, and this new order of the inner movements was reflected in the second and third published editions of the score, as well as the Essen premiere.

1. Allegro energico, ma non troppo. Heftig, aber markig.
2. Andante moderato
3. Scherzo: Wuchtig
4. Finale: Sostenuto – Allegro moderato – Allegro energico

The first three movements are relatively traditional in structure and character, with a standard sonata form first movement (even including an exact repeat of the exposition, unusual in Mahler) leading to the middle movements – one a scherzo-with-trios, the other slow. However, attempts to analyze the vast finale in terms of the sonata archetype have encountered serious difficulties. As Dika Newlin has pointed out:

it has elements of what is conventionally known as 'sonata form', but the music does not follow a set pattern ... Thus, 'expositional' treatment merges directly into the type of contrapuntal and modulatory writing appropriate to 'elaboration' sections ...; the beginning of the principal theme-group is recapitulated in C minor rather than in A minor, and the C minor chorale theme ... of the exposition is never recapitulated at all.

=== I. Allegro energico, ma non troppo. Heftig, aber markig. ===
The first movement, which for the most part has the character of a march, features a motif consisting of an A major triad turning to A minor over a distinctive timpani rhythm. The chords are played by trumpets and oboes when first heard, with the trumpets sounding the loudest in the first chord and the oboes in the second.

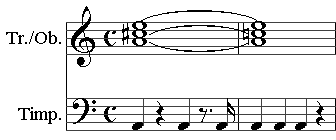

Listen

This motif reappears in subsequent movements. The first movement also features a soaring melody which the composer's wife, Alma Mahler, claimed represented her. This melody is often called the "Alma theme". A restatement of that theme at the movement's end marks the happiest point of the symphony.

=== II. Scherzo: Wuchtig ===
The scherzo marks a return to the unrelenting march rhythms of the first movement, though in a 'triple-time' metrical context.

Its trio (the middle section), marked Altväterisch ('old-fashioned'), is rhythmically irregular (4/8 switching to 3/8 and 3/4) and of a somewhat gentler character.

According to Alma Mahler, in this movement Mahler "represented the unrhythmical games of the two little children, tottering in zigzags over the sand". The chronology of its composition suggests otherwise. The movement was composed in the summer of 1903, when Maria Anna (born November 1902) was less than a year old. Anna Justine was born a year later in June 1904.

=== III. Andante moderato ===
[[:File:Mahler Symphony No 6 Andante Moderato.ogg|III. Andante moderato]]
Performed by the Virtual Philharmonic Orchestra (Reinhold Behringer) with digital samples

The andante provides a respite from the intensity of the rest of the work. Its main theme is an introspective ten-bar phrase in E♭ major, though it frequently touches on the minor mode as well. This theme, which is repeated three times, is actually a quote from "Nun will die Sonn' so hell aufgehn", the first song of Kindertotenlieder. The movement's second theme eventually returns in the violins, leading to climax played by the horns, with cowbells loudly clashing with the rest of the orchestra. The strife is short lived, however, and the music finds solace in its final bars.

=== IV. Finale: Sostenuto – Allegro moderato – Allegro energico ===
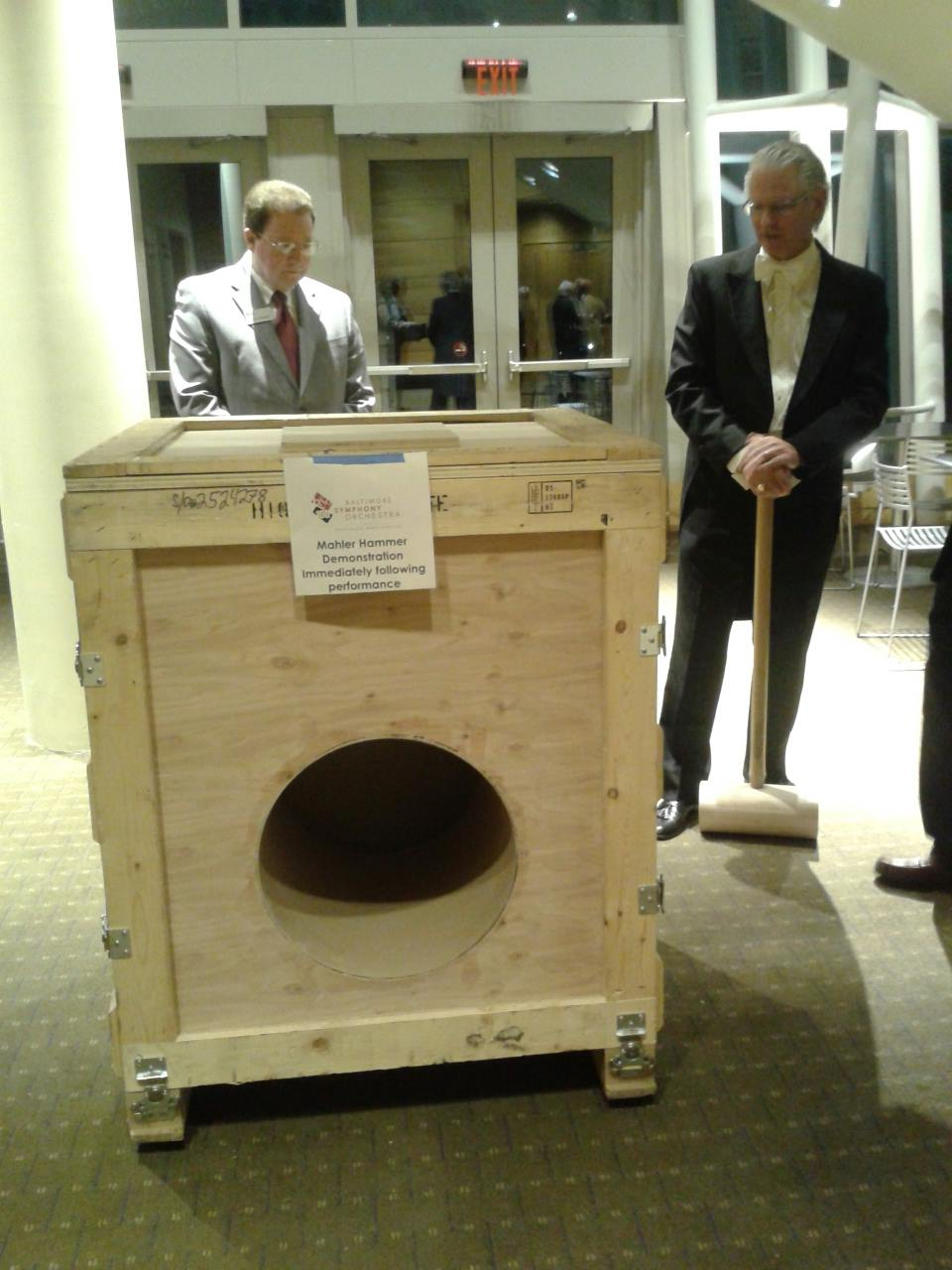
Another version of the "hammer", used by the Baltimore Symphony Orchestra for performances in November 2016

The last movement is an extended sonata form with an introduction and coda, characterized by drastic changes in mood and tempo, the sudden change of glorious soaring melody to deep agony.

The movement is punctuated by two hammer blows. The original score had five hammer blows, which Mahler subsequently reduced to three, and eventually to two.

Alma quoted her husband as saying that these were three mighty blows of fate befallen by the hero, "the third of which fells him like a tree". She identified these blows with three later events in Gustav Mahler's own life: the death of his eldest daughter Maria Anna Mahler, the diagnosis of an eventually fatal heart condition, and his forced resignation from the Vienna Opera and departure from Vienna. When he revised the work, Mahler removed the last of these three hammer strokes so that the music built to a sudden moment of stillness in place of the third blow. Some recordings and performances, notably those of Leonard Bernstein, have restored the third hammer blow. The piece ends with the same rhythmic motif that appeared in the first movement, but the chord above it is a simple A minor triad, rather than A major turning into A minor. After the third 'hammer-blow' passage, the music gropes in darkness and then the trombones and horns begin to offer consolation. However, after they turn briefly to major they fade away and the final bars erupt fff in the minor.

== Order of the inner movements and performance history issue ==
=== Initial history ===
Controversy exists over the order of the two middle movements. Mahler conceived the work as having the scherzo second and the slow movement third, an arrangement adumbrated in such earlier large-scale symphonies as Beethoven's No. 9, Bruckner's No. 8 and (unfinished) No. 9, and Mahler's own four-movement No. 1 and No. 4. It was in this arrangement that the symphony was completed (in 1904) and published (in March 1906); and it was with a conducting score in which the scherzo preceded the slow movement that Mahler began rehearsals for the work's first performance, as noted by Mahler biographer Henry-Louis de La Grange:

"Scherzo 2" was undeniably the original order, the one in which Mahler first conceived, composed, and published the Sixth Symphony, and also the one in which he rehearsed the work with two different orchestras before changing his mind at the last minute before the premiere.

Alfred Roller, a close collaborator and colleague of Mahler's in Vienna, communicated in a letter dated 2 May 1906 to his fiancée Mileva Stojsavljevic, on the Mahlers' reaction to the orchestral rehearsal of the work in Vienna on 1 May 1906 in its original movement order:

Today I was there at noon, but I could not talk much with Alma, since M[ahler] was almost always there, I saw only that the two of them were very happy and satisfied...

During those later May 1906 rehearsals in Essen, however, Mahler decided that the slow movement should precede the scherzo. Klaus Pringsheim, another colleague of Mahler's at the Hofoper, reminisced in a 1920 article on the situation at the Essen rehearsals, on Mahler's state of mind at the time:

Those close to him were well aware of Mahler's "insecurity". Even after the final rehearsal he was still not sure whether or not he had found the right tempo for the Scherzo, and had wondered whether he should invert the order of the second and third movements (which he subsequently did).

Mahler instructed his publishers Christian Friedrich Kahnt to prepare a "second edition" of the work with the movements in that order, and meanwhile to insert errata slips indicating the change of order into all unsold copies of the existing edition. Mahler conducted the public premiere on 27 May 1906 and his other two subsequent performances of the Sixth Symphony, in November 1906 (Munich) and 4 January 1907 (Vienna), with his revised order of the inner movements.

=== History from 1911 to 1960 ===
In the period immediately after Mahler's death, scholars such as Paul Bekker, Ernst Decsey, Richard Specht, and Paul Stefan published studies with reference to the Sixth Symphony in Mahler's second edition with the Andante/Scherzo order. One of the first occasions after Mahler's death where the conductor reverted to the original movement order is in 1919/1920, after an inquiry in the autumn of 1919 from Willem Mengelberg to Alma Mahler in preparation for the May 1920 Mahler Festival in Amsterdam of the complete symphonies, regarding the order of the inner movements of the Sixth Symphony. In a telegram dated 1 October 1919, Alma responded to Mengelberg:

Erst Scherzo dann Andante herzlichst Alma ["First Scherzo then Andante affectionately Alma"]

Mengelberg, who had been in close touch with Mahler until the latter's death, and had conducted the symphony in the "Andante/Scherzo" arrangement up to 1916, then switched to the "Scherzo/Andante" order. In his own copy of the score, he wrote on the first page:

Nach Mahlers Angabe II erst Scherzo dann III Andante ["According to Mahler's indications, first II Scherzo, then III Andante"]

Other conductors, such as Oskar Fried, continued to perform the work as 'Andante/Scherzo', and the first commercial recordings of the work were issued per the second edition, right up to the early 1960s. Performance exceptions included two performances in Vienna on 14 December 1930 and 23 May 1933 conducted by Anton Webern, who utilised the Scherzo/Andante order of the inner movements. Anna Mahler, Mahler's daughter, attended both of these performances. Per the scholarship of Herta Blaukopf, De La Grange commented on Webern's choice of the Scherzo/Andante order:

Anton Webern had favoured the original order of movements in the two performances he conducted in Vienna on 14 December 1930 and 23 May 1933. Webern was not only a great composer, but also one of Mahler's earliest and most passionate devotees and a much admired conductor of Mahler's music ... it is inconceivable that he could have performed a version that would have shocked and displeased his beloved master and mentor.

=== Erwin Ratz edition (1963) ===
In 1963, a new critical edition of the Sixth Symphony appeared, under the auspices of the Internationale Gustav Mahler Gesellschaft (IGMG) and its president, Erwin Ratz, a pupil of Webern, an edition which restored Mahler's original order of the inner movements. Ratz did not cite such documented support such as Alma Mahler's 1919 telegram, for his assertion that Mahler "changed his mind a second time" at some point before his death, but instead cited sources such as the work of Paul Stefan, who had attended the 1920 Mahler Festival in Amsterdam and had stated in his subsequent 1920 book on Mahler:

"Ths sequence of middle movements sanctioned by Mahler as definitive is: Scherzo before the Andante."

In his analysis of the Sixth Symphony, Norman Del Mar argued for the Andante/Scherzo order of the inner movements, and criticised the Ratz edition for its paucity of documentary evidence to justify the Scherzo/Andante order. In contrast, scholars such as Theodor W. Adorno, Henry-Louis de La Grange, Hans-Peter Jülg and Karl Heinz Füssl have argued for the original order as more appropriate, expostulating on the overall tonal scheme and the various relationships between the keys in the final three movements. Füssl, in particular, noted that Ratz made his decision under historical circumstances where the history of the different autographs and versions was not completely known at the time. Füssl has also noted the following features of the Scherzo/Andante order:

- The Scherzo is an example of 'developing variation' in its treatment of material from the first movement, where separation of the Scherzo from the first movement by the Andante disrupts that linkage.
- The Scherzo and the first movement use identical keys, A minor at the beginning and F major in the trio.
- The Andante's key, E♭ major, is farthest removed from the key at the close of the first movement (A major), whilst the C minor key at the beginning of the finale acts as transition from E♭ major to A minor, the principal key of the finale.

The 1968 Eulenberg Edition of the Sixth Symphony, edited by Hans Redlich, restores most of Mahler's original orchestration and utilises the original order of Scherzo/Andante for the order of the middle movements.

=== Reinhold Kubik edition (2010) ===
The IGMG published the next critical edition of the Sixth Symphony in 2010, under the general editorship of Reinhold Kubik. This edition uses the Andante/Scherzo order for the middle movements. Kubik had previously declared in 2004:

As the current Chief Editor of the Complete Critical Edition, I declare the official position of the institution I represent is that the correct order of the middle movements of Mahler's Sixth Symphony is Andante-Scherzo.

This statement has been criticised, in the manner of earlier criticism of Ratz, on several levels:

- for itself lacking documentary support and for expressing a personal preference based on subjective animus related to the Alma Problem, rather than any actual documentary evidence
- for its blanket dismissal of the evidence of the original score with the Scherzo/Andante order
- for imposing an advance bias rather than allowing musicians to arrive at their own choice independently.

Herta Blaukopf rebutted this position of either order alone being "the correct order" with reference to Mahler's actual compositional practices:

'...in this question there is certainly no “correct” or “incorrect”, no “right” or “wrong” – at best there is only an “in the end”. Mahler’s symphonies were subjected to minor and major revisions and developments as many times as they were performed. We can, therefore, refer only to the last state of his thoughts on the matter. What must be considered is that which is revealed by historical documents and that which is revealed by the music itself.'

=== Christian Riedel and Nick Pfefferkorn edition (2026) ===
Breitkopf & Härtel published the most recent critical edition of the symphony in 2026, under the general editorship of Christian Rudolf Riedel and Nick Pfefferkorn. This edition utilises the revised order of the inner movements, Andante/Scherzo. Constantin Floros, in his preface to the 2026 edition, aligns with the 2010 Kubik edition in its emphasis on the historical documentation of the performances conducted by Mahler as justification for the publication with the revised inner movement order, without a specific statement of either order in the manner of Kubik as the sole "correct" option and with an acknowledgement of differences of opinion regarding the order of the inner movemments:

'Despite the long-established and undisputed source situation, opinions still differ today about the "correct" order of the inner movements.'

=== Discussion on availability of both options ===
Referring to the 1919 Mengelberg telegram, de La Grange has questioned the notion of Alma simply expressing a personal view of the movement order, and reiterates the historical fact of the original movement order:

The fact that the initial order had the composer's stamp of approval for two whole years prior to the premiere argues for further performances in that form...
It is far more likely ten years after Mahler's death and with a much clearer perspective on his life and career, Alma would have sought to be faithful to his artistic intentions. Thus, her telegram of 1919 still remains a strong argument today in favour of Mahler's original order ... it is stretching the bounds of both language and reason to describe [Andante-Scherzo] as the "only correct" one. Mahler's Sixth Symphony, like many other compositions in the repertory, will always remain a "dual-version" work, but few of the others have attracted quite as much controversy.

De La Grange has noted the justification of having both options available for conductors to choose:

... given that Mahler changed his mind so many times, it is understandable that a conductor might nowadays wish to stand by the order in the second version, if he is deeply convinced that he can serve the work better by doing this.

Mahler scholar Donald Mitchell echoed the dual-version scenario and the need for the availability of both options:

I believe that all serious students of his music should make up their own minds about which order in their view represents Mahler's genius. He was after all in two minds about it himself. We should let the music – how we hear it – decide! For me there is no right or wrong in this matter. We should continue to hear, quite legitimately, both versions of the symphony, according to the convictions of the interpreters involved. After all the first version has a fascinating history and legitimacy endowed by none other than the composer himself! Of course we must respect the fact of his final change of mind but to imagine that we should accept this without debate or comment beggars belief.

In keeping with Mahler's original order, British conductor John Carewe has noted parallels between the tonal plan of Beethoven's Symphony No. 7 and Mahler's Symphony No. 6, with the Scherzo/Andante order of movements in the latter. British composer David Matthews, a former adherent of the Andante/Scherzo order, who changed his mind and has since argued for Scherzo/Andante as the preferred order, likewise cited the overall tonal scheme of the symphony. Matthews has noted the interconnectivity of the first movement with the Scherzo as similar to Mahler's interconnectivity of the first two movements of the Fifth Symphony, and that performing the Mahler with the Andante/Scherzo order damages the structure of the tonal key relationships and removes this parallel, a structural disruption of what de La Grange has described as follows:

... that very idea which many listeners today consider one of the most audacious and brilliant ever conceived by Mahler –: the linking of two movements – one in quadruple, the other in triple time – with more or less the same thematic material

Matthews, Paul Banks, and scholar Warren Darcy (the last an advocate for the Andante/Scherzo order) have independently proposed the idea of two separate editions of the symphony, one to accommodate each version of the order of the inner movements. Music commentator David Hurwitz has likewise remarked:

So as far as the facts go, then, we have on the one hand what Mahler actually did when he last performed the symphony, and on the other hand, what he originally composed and what his wife reported that he ultimately wanted. Any objective observer would be compelled to admit that this constitutes strong evidence for both perspectives. This being the case, the responsible thing to do in revisiting the need for a new Critical Edition would be to set out all of the arguments on each side, and then take no position. Let the performers decide, and admit frankly that if the criterion for making a decision regarding the correct order of the inner movements must be what Mahler himself ultimately wanted, then no final answer is possible.

An additional question is whether to restore the third hammer blow. The Ratz edition, the Kubik edition, and the Riedel and Pfefferkorn edition all delete the third hammer blow. However, advocates on opposite sides of the inner movement debate, such as Del Mar and Matthews, have separately argued for restoration of the third hammer blow. The Kubik edition has stated that restoration of the third hammer blow necessitates parallel restoration of the original dynamics and scoring for that entire passage.

== Selected discography ==
This discography encompasses both audio and video recordings, and classifies them as to the order of the middle movements. Recordings with three hammer blows in the finale are noted with an asterisk (*).

=== Scherzo / Andante ===
- Erich Leinsdorf, Boston Symphony Orchestra, RCA Victor Red Seal LSC-7044
- Jascha Horenstein, Royal Stockholm Philharmonic Orchestra, Unicorn UKCD 2024/5 (live recording from 1966)
- Leonard Bernstein, New York Philharmonic, Sony Classical SMK 60208 (*)
- Václav Neumann, Leipzig Gewandhaus Orchestra, Berlin Classics 0090452BC
- George Szell, Cleveland Orchestra, Sony Classical SBK 47654
- Bernard Haitink, Concertgebouw Orchestra, Amsterdam, Q-DISC 97014 (live performance from November 1968)
- Rafael Kubelík, Bavarian Radio Symphony Orchestra, Deutsche Grammophon 289 478 7897-1
- Rafael Kubelík, Bavarian Radio Symphony Orchestra, Audite 1475671 (live recording of 6 December 1968 performance)
- Bernard Haitink, Concertgebouw Orchestra, Amsterdam, Philips 289 420 138-2
- Jascha Horenstein, Bournemouth Symphony Orchestra, BBC Legends BBCL4191-2
- Georg Solti, Chicago Symphony Orchestra, Decca 414 674-2
- Hans Zender, Saarbrücken Radio Symphony Orchestra, CPO 999 477-2
- Maurice Abravanel, Utah Symphony, Vanguard Classics SRV 323/4 (LP)
- Herbert von Karajan, Berlin Philharmonic, Deutsche Grammophon 289 415 099-2
- Leonard Bernstein, Vienna Philharmonic, Deutsche Grammophon DVD 440 073 409-05 (live film recording from October 1976) (*)
- James Levine, London Symphony Orchestra, RCA Red Seal RCD2-3213
- Herbert von Karajan, Berlin Philharmonic, Saint Laurent Studio (live recording of 17 June 1977 performance)
- Herbert von Karajan, Berlin Philharmonic, Fachmann FKM-CDR-193 (live recording of 27 August 1977 performance)
- Kirill Kondrashin, Leningrad Philharmonic Orchestra, Melodiya CD 10 00811
- Václav Neumann, Czech Philharmonic, Supraphon 11 1977-2
- Claudio Abbado, Chicago Symphony Orchestra, Deutsche Grammophon 289 423 928-2
- Milan Horvat, Philharmonica Slavonica, Line 4593003
- Kirill Kondrashin, SWR Sinfonieorchester Baden-Baden und Freiburg, Hänssler Classic 9842273 (live recording from January 1981)
- Lorin Maazel, Vienna Philharmonic, Sony Classical S14K 48198
- Klaus Tennstedt, London Philharmonic Orchestra, EMI Classics CDC7 47050-8
- Klaus Tennstedt, London Philharmonic Orchestra. LPO-0038 (live recording from the 1983 Proms)
- Erich Leinsdorf, Bavarian Radio Symphony Orchestra, Orfeo C 554 011 B (live recording of 10 June 1983 performance)
- Gary Bertini, Cologne Radio Symphony Orchestra, EMI Classics 94634 02382
- Giuseppe Sinopoli, Philharmonia Orchestra, Deutsche Grammophon 289 423 082-2
- Eliahu Inbal, Frankfurt Radio Symphony, 1986, Denon Blu-spec cd (COCO-73280-1)
- Leonard Bernstein, Vienna Philharmonic, Deutsche Grammophon 289 427 697-2 (*)
- Michiyoshi Inoue, Royal Philharmonic Orchestra, Pickwick/RPO CDRPO 9005
- Bernard Haitink, Berlin Philharmonic, Philips 289 426 257-2
- Riccardo Chailly, Royal Concertgebouw Orchestra, Decca 444 871-2
- Hartmut Haenchen, Netherlands Philharmonic Orchestra, Capriccio 10 543
- Hiroshi Wakasugi, Tokyo Metropolitan Symphony Orchestra, 1989, Fontec FOCD9022/3
- Leif Segerstam, Danish Radio Symphony Orchestra, Chandos CHAN 8956/7
- Christoph von Dohnányi, Cleveland Orchestra, Decca 289 466 345-2
- Klaus Tennstedt, London Philharmonic Orchestra, EMI Classics 7243 5 55294 28 (live recording from November 1991)
- Anton Nanut, Radio Symphony Orchestra Ljubljana, Zyx Classic CLS 4110
- Neeme Järvi, Royal Scottish National Orchestra, Chandos CHAN 9207
- Antoni Wit, Polish National Radio Symphony Orchestra, Naxos 8.550529
- Seiji Ozawa, Boston Symphony Orchestra, Philips 289 434 909-2
- Yevgeny Svetlanov, State Symphony Orchestra of the Russian Federation, Warner Classics 2564 68886-2 (box set)
- Emil Tabakov, Sofia Philharmonic Orchestra, Capriccio C49043
- Edo de Waart, Radio Filharmonisch Orkest, RCA 27607
- Pierre Boulez, Vienna Philharmonic, Deutsche Grammophon 289 445 835-2
- Zubin Mehta, Israel Philharmonic Orchestra, Warner Apex 9106459
- Thomas Sanderling, Saint Petersburg Philharmonic Orchestra, RS Real Sound RS052-0186
- Yoel Levi, Atlanta Symphony Orchestra, Telarc CD 80444
- Michael Gielen, SWR Sinfonieorchester Baden-Baden und Freiburg, Hänssler Classics 93029
- Günther Herbig, Saarbrücken Radio Symphony Orchestra, Berlin Classics 0094612BC
- Michiyoshi Inoue, New Japan Philharmonic, 2000, Exton OVCL-00121
- Michael Tilson Thomas, San Francisco Symphony, SFS Media 40382001 (recorded September 2001)
- Bernard Haitink, Orchestre National de France, Naïve V4937
- Christoph Eschenbach, The Philadelphia Orchestra, Ondine ODE1084-5B
- Mark Wigglesworth, Melbourne Symphony Orchestra, MSO Live 391666
- Bernard Haitink, Chicago Symphony Orchestra, CSO Resound 210000045796
- Vladimir Fedoseyev, Tchaikovsky Symphony Orchestra of Moscow Radio, Relief 2735809
- Eiji Oue, Osaka Philharmonic Orchestra, Fontec FOCD9253/4
- Takashi Asahina, Osaka Philharmonic Orchestra, Green Door GDOP-2009
- Jonathan Nott, Bamberg Symphony Orchestra, Tudor 7191
- Esa-Pekka Salonen, Philharmonia Orchestra, Signum SIGCD275
- Hartmut Haenchen, Orchestre Symphonique du Théâtre de la Monnaie, ICA Classics DVD ICAD5018
- Antal Doráti, Israel Philharmonic Orchestra, Helicon 9699053 (live recording of 27 October 1963 performance)
- Lorin Maazel, Royal Concertgebouw Orchestra, RCO Live RCO 12101 DVD
- Paavo Järvi, Frankfurt Radio Symphony Orchestra, C-Major DVD 729404
- Jukka-Pekka Saraste, Oslo Philharmonic, Simax PSC1316 (*)
- Pierre Boulez, Lucerne Festival Academy Orchestra, Accentus Music ACC30230
- Antonio Pappano, Orchestra dell'Accademia Nazionale di Santa Cecilia, EMI Classics (Warner Classics 5099908441324)
- Lorin Maazel, Philharmonia Orchestra, Signum SIGCD361
- Jaap van Zweden, Dallas Symphony Orchestra, DSO Live
- Libor Pešek, Czech National Symphony Orchestra, Out of the Frame OUT 068
- Václav Neumann, Czech Philharmonic, Exton OVCL-00259
- Zdeněk Mácal, Czech Philharmonic, Exton OVCL-00245
- Vladimir Ashkenazy, Czech Philharmonic, Exton OVCL-00051
- Eliahu Inbal, Tokyo Metropolitan Symphony Orchestra, 2007, Fontec SACD (FOCD9369)
- Eliahu Inbal, Tokyo Metropolitan Symphony Orchestra, 2013, Exton SACD (OVCL-00516 & OVXL-00090 "one point recording version")
- Gary Bertini, Tokyo Metropolitan Symphony Orchestra, Fontec FOCD9182
- Georges Prêtre, Wiener Symphoniker, Weitblick SSS0079-2
- Giuseppe Sinopoli, Stuttgart Radio Symphony Orchestra, Weitblick SSS0108-2
- Rudolf Barshai, Yomiuri Nippon Symphony Orchestra, Tobu YNSO Archive Series YASCD1009-2
- Martin Sieghart, Arnhem Philharmonic Orchestra, Exton HGO 0403
- Heinz Bongartz, Leipzig Radio Symphony Orchestra, Weitblick SSS0053-2
- Teodor Currentzis, MusicAeterna, Sony Classical 19075822952
- Paavo Järvi, NHK Symphony Orchestra, Tokyo, RCA Victor Red Seal SICC 19040
- Michael Gielen, SWR Sinfonieorchester Baden-Baden und Freiburg, SWR Classic SWR19080CD (live concert performance from 1971)
- Michael Tilson Thomas, San Francisco Symphony, SFS Media (digital release, UPC 821936007723, live recording of September 2019)
- Tomáš Netopil, Essen Philharmonic, Oehms Classics OC 1716
- Jahja Ling, San Diego Symphony, San Diego Symphony proprietary label, Jacobs Masterworks (recorded 2008)
- Mariss Jansons, Bavarian Radio Symphony Orchestra, BR Klassik 900719 (live performance from October 2011)
- Yutaka Sado, Tonkünstler Orchestra, Tonkünstler Orchestra TON2016
- Bernard Haitink, Royal Concertgebouw Orchestra, RCO Live RCO 25003 (live performance from 7 December 2001)
- Semyon Bychkov, Czech Philharmonic, Pentatone PTC5187490

=== Andante / Scherzo ===
- Charles Adler, Vienna Symphony Orchestra, Spa Records SPA 59/60
- Eduard Flipse, Rotterdam Philharmonic Orchestra, Philips ABL 3103-4 (LP), Naxos Classical Archives 9.80846-48 (CD)
- Dimitri Mitropoulos, New York Philharmonic, NYP Editions (live recording from 10 April 1955)
- Eduard van Beinum, Concertgebouw Orchestra, Amsterdam, Tahra 614/5 (live recording from 7 December 1955)
- Sir John Barbirolli, Berlin Philharmonic, Testament SBT1342 (live recording of 13 January 1966 performance)
- Sir John Barbirolli. New Philharmonia Orchestra, Testament SBT1451 (live recording of 16 August 1967 Proms performance)
- Sir John Barbirolli, New Philharmonia Orchestra, EMI 7 67816 2 (studio recording, 17–19 August 1967)
- Harold Farberman, London Symphony Orchestra, Vox 7212 (CD)
- Heinz Rögner, Berlin Radio Symphony Orchestra, Eterna 8-27 612-613
- Simon Rattle, City of Birmingham Symphony Orchestra, EMI Classics CDS5 56925-2
- Glen Cortese, Manhattan School of Music Symphony Orchestra, Titanic 257
- Andrew Litton, Dallas Symphony Orchestra, Delos (live recording, limited commemorative edition)
- Sir Charles Mackerras, BBC Philharmonic, BBC Music Magazine MM251 (Vol 13, No 7) (*)
- Mariss Jansons, London Symphony Orchestra, LSO Live LSO0038
- Claudio Abbado, Berlin Philharmonic, Deutsche Grammophon 289 477 557-39
- Iván Fischer, Budapest Festival Orchestra, Channel Classics 22905
- Mariss Jansons, Royal Concertgebouw Orchestra, RCO Live RCO06001
- Claudio Abbado, Lucerne Festival Orchestra, Euroarts DVD 2055648
- Simone Young, Hamburg Philharmonic, Oehms Classics OC413
- David Zinman, Tonhalle Orchester Zürich, RCA Red Seal 88697 45165 2
- Valery Gergiev, London Symphony Orchestra, LSO Live LSO0661
- Jonathan Darlington, Duisburg Philharmonic, Acousence 7944879
- Petr Vronsky, Moravian Philharmonic Orchestra, ArcoDiva UP0122-2
- Fabio Luisi, Vienna Symphony, Live WS003
- Vladimir Ashkenazy, Sydney Symphony Orchestra, SSO Live
- Riccardo Chailly, Leipzig Gewandhaus Orchestra, Accentus Music DVD ACC-2068
- Markus Stenz, Gürzenich Orchestra Köln, Oehms Classics OC651
- Gabriel Feltz, Stuttgart Philharmonic, Dreyer Gaido 9595564
- Daniel Harding, Bavarian Radio Symphony Orchestra, BR-Klassik 900132
- Simon Rattle, Berlin Philharmonic Orchestra, BPH 7558515 (live recording from 1987)
- James Levine, Boston Symphony Orchestra, BSO Classics 0902-D
- Osmo Vänskä, Minnesota Orchestra, BIS 2266
- Simon Rattle, Berlin Philharmonic Orchestra (live recordings from 1987 and 2018, with DVD of 2018 performance)
- Michael Gielen, SWR Sinfonieorchester Baden-Baden und Freiburg, SWR Classic SWR19080CD (live concert performance from 2013)
- Hans Rosbaud, Southwest German Radio Symphony Orchestra, SWR 19099 (live recording)
- Ádám Fischer, Düsseldorfer Symphoniker, CAvi-music AVI 8553490 (*)
- Simon Gaudenz, Jenaer Philharmonie, Odradek Recordings ODRCD450
- Sir Simon Rattle, Bavarian Radio Symphony Orchestra, BR Klassik 900217
- Kirill Petrenko, Berlin Philharmonic, BPHR200364 (live recording)

== Premieres ==
- World premiere: 27 May 1906, Saalbau Essen, conducted by the composer
- Dutch première: 16 September 1916, Amsterdam, with the Concertgebouw Orchestra conducted by Willem Mengelberg
- American premiere: 11 December 1947, New York City, conducted by Dimitri Mitropoulos
- Recording premiere: F. Charles Adler conducting the Vienna Symphony, 1952
