= Manon Gropius =

Austrian daughter of Walter Gropius and Alma Mahler

- Born: Alma Manon Anna Justina Carolina Gropius; 5 October 1916; Vienna, Austria-Hungary
- Died: 22 April 1935 (aged 18); Vienna, Austria
- Occupation: Muse
- Parent(s): Walter Gropius, Alma Mahler
- Writing career
- Pen name: Mutzi

Alma Manon Anna Justina Carolina Gropius (5 October 1916 – 22 April 1935) was the Austrian-born daughter of the German architect Walter Gropius and the Austrian composer and diarist Alma Mahler and the stepdaughter of the novelist and poet Franz Werfel. She is a Randfigur (peripheral person) whose importance lies in her relationships to major figures: a muse who inspired the composer Alban Berg, as well as Werfel and the Nobel Prize-winning writer Elias Canetti. Manon Gropius is most often cited as the "angel" and dedicatee of Berg's Violin Concerto.

== Life ==
Manon Gropius, christened in a Lutheran church as Alma Manon Anna Justina Carolina, was born in Vienna during the height of World War I, on 5 October 1916, the third child of Alma Mahler, the widow of the composer and conductor Gustav Mahler, and wife of the architect and Bauhaus founder Walter Gropius. Her parents separated soon after Gropius discovered Alma's affair with the writer Franz Werfel in the summer of 1918 and the true paternity of her fourth child, Martin Johannes Gropius.

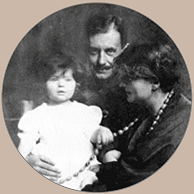
Manon Gropius with her parents Alma Mahler and Walter Gropius, 1918

Like other children of her background and parentage, Manon, called "Mutzi" by family and friends (she was childhood friends with Maria Altmann, also called "Mutzi" later in life), was raised by her nanny, a former Austro-Hungarian Army nurse, Ida Gebauer (whom Manon called "Schulli"). Her early life was spent traveling with her mother between Alma's three homes in Vienna, Breitenstein am Semmering, and Venice, as well as at Weimar, the site of the first Bauhaus school. Her travels also included many German cities, including Leipzig, where Franz Werfel's play Spiegelmensch (Mirror Man) premiered in 1921. There, the precocious five-year-old saw the rehearsals and began to "perform" the roles of the heroine as well as declaim lines. From that time on, her mother, Werfel, and others in their milieu cultivated the girl's interest in the theater.

During the early 1920s, Walter Gropius gave Alma the legal grounds to divorce him for infidelity, by arranging to be discovered in flagrante delicto with a prostitute. His cooperation came with the understanding that Manon would be allowed to stay with him and his new wife, Ise Gropius, at Dessau, where the Bauhaus had relocated. Only in November 1927 did Alma finally agree to an extended visit. From that time, Gropius and his daughter began to exchange letters as well as gifts, including a set of Gropius-designed furniture and books and magazines in which Gropius hid private communications so as to avoid interception by the overly possessive Alma. Walter Gropius enjoyed only one more extended visit in 1932.

Manon was educated at home by Schulli and various tutors. Like her older half-sister, Anna Mahler, she was given piano lessons, but did not distinguish herself as a musician. She attended the same progressive girls' school that her mother attended, Institut Hanausek, in Vienna's First District. But her irascible behavior, owing much to her free-spirited early childhood—Alma let her go about naked ("stripped") as much as possible—led Manon to eventually leave the school, and her education continued at home. Although she wanted to be an actress, her mother wanted her to have a practical education, too, and Manon, who had become fluent in French and Italian, prepared for the Austrian state exam as a language teacher and translator.

During the 1930s, she became more tractable, even serene. She had a way with animals and was often followed by cats and dogs. She could approach and feed wild roe deer and took a special interest in snakes. Werfel—who had married her mother in 1929 and no longer needed to be called by the euphemism "Onkel"—being well-versed in comparative religion, noticed the Potnia Theron-like associations as well as the attributes of a Christian saint such as St. Francis of Assisi. Manon, who had been baptized a Lutheran Protestant, converted to Catholicism in 1932 and came under the influence of her mother's admirer, Fr. Johannes Hollnsteiner. It was during this time that Elias Canetti saw her and, like the composer Ernst Krenek and others in Alma's circle, wrote about his impressions of Manon in his memoirs. Canetti suggests Alma looked upon Manon as just another trophy, on a par with her three husbands and many possessions:

Hardly a moment later a gazelle came tripping into the room, a light-footed, brown-haired creature disguised as a young girl, untouched by the splendor into which she had been summoned, younger in her innocence than her probable sixteen years. She radiated timidity even more than beauty, an angelic gazelle, not from the ark but from heaven. I jumped up, thinking to bar her entrance into this alcove of vice or at least to cut off her view of the poisoner on the wall, but Lucrezia, who never stopped playing her part, had irrepressibly taken the floor:

"Beautiful, isn't she? This is my daughter Manon. By Gropius. In a class by herself. You don't mind my saying so, do you, Annerl [diminutive for Anna Mahler]? What's wrong with having a beautiful sister? Like father, like daughter. Did you ever see Gropius? A big handsome man. The true Aryan type. The only man who was racially suited to me. All the others who fell in love with me were little Jews. Like Mahler. The fact is, I go for both kinds. You can run along now, pussycat. Wait, go and see if Franzl [diminutive for Franz Werfel] is writing poetry. If he is, don't bother him. If he isn't, tell him I want him."

With this commission Manon, the third trophy, slipped out of the room, as untouched as she had come; her errand didn't seem to trouble her. I was greatly relieved at the thought that nothing could touch her, that she would always remain as she was and never become like her mother, the poisoner on the wall, the glassy, blubbery old woman on the sofa.

The teenage Manon Gropius was used by her aging mother, Alma Mahler, to attract the kind of sensual male attention Alma had enjoyed in her youth. Alma sought to arrange a match between the teenage Manon and an older acquaintance, the Austrofascist politician Anton Rintelen, who was later arrested and imprisoned for his role in the failed Nazi July Putsch of 1934.

Manon never lost her desire to act. She even wrote the famous Burgtheater actor Raoul Aslan a letter and a poem in which she expressed her desire to one day perform on the same stage. With her dark long hair and beauty, she so impressed the theater director Max Reinhardt that he offered the part of First Angel in a revival of his and Hugo von Hofmannsthal's adaptation of Calderón's The Great Theater of the World for the 1934 Salzburg Festival. But Werfel did not think Manon had the training for such an important role, having only performed in a few theater productions that he had directed himself to entertain her mother and their friends on the back porch of Haus Mahler in Breitenstein, a porch her father designed in 1916. So, as her stepfather, Werfel refused to allow Manon the opportunity.

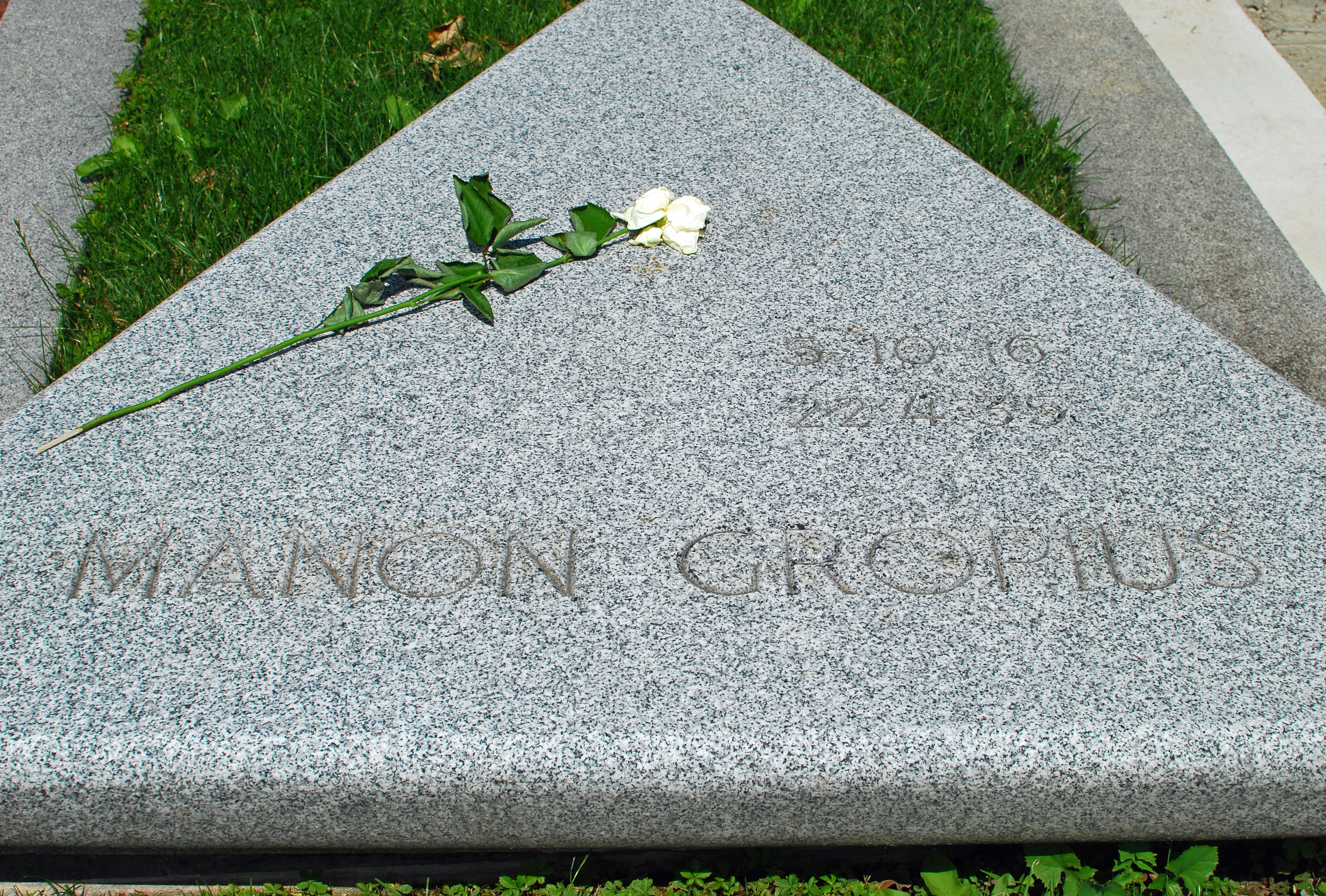
Manon's grave in Grinzing Cemetery. Her mother was buried in the same grave in 1964

In March 1934, Manon and her mother traveled to Venice for the Easter holiday. There, Manon contracted polio, which left her totally paralyzed. She returned to Vienna, where she recovered some use of her arms and hands. She was still determined to act; teachers from the famous Reinhardt-Seminar made house calls. Alma also encouraged visitors, including a younger Austrofascist, a bureaucrat named Erich Cyhlar, to court Manon, in the hopes that pending nuptials would compel her to walk again.

In mid-April, Manon gave her mother and stepfather a private performance in their home. Then, over Holy Week, she suffered breathing problems and organ failure. She had been receiving an aggressive form of diathermy that employed X-ray machines, which can induce iatrogenic complications.

Manon Gropius died on 22 April 1935, and was buried in Grinzing Cemetery in a ceremony that Canetti also described in great detail. Her father and stepmother traveled from England to Germany, which placed strictures on its citizens as well as punitive fees for crossing its border with Austria.

== Legacy ==
In the weeks after her funeral, two attendees, Franz Werfel and Alban Berg, both planned to honor Manon's memory as well as console her mother Alma, who had not attended the funeral. Berg had already started his Violin Concerto before Manon's death. He and his wife, Helene, considered Manon a daughter; the childless Helene Berg kept a photograph of Manon by her bed. Berg soon adapted and finished the concerto, which included programmatic allusions to Manon and, according to some musicologists, Berg's illegitimate daughter, Albine, in much the same way his Lyric Suite (1926) alludes to its secret dedicatee, Hanna Fuchs-Robettin, Werfel's sister, with whom Berg had an affair in the 1920s.

Werfel planned a novel about a fictional Catholic saint's life in late-17th-century Venice, Legends, with various subtitles: The Intercessoress of Animals, of Snakes, and of the Dead. Much of the research for this book eventually informed The Song of Bernadette (1942), a novel dedicated to Manon that features elements of her character and appearance in both the character Bernadette and the apparition of the Blessed Virgin, which she calls the Lady in White, a pagan term related to the Weiße Frauen of German folklore. Werfel also wrote a necrology about Manon's life for the Catholic journal Commonweal to explain the significance of his dedication, something he never did for other books. Other Werfel novels also feature characters modeled on Manon, notably the prophet Jeremiah's Egyptian bride-to-be in Hearken unto the Voice (1937) and the Bride in his last novel, Star of the Unborn (1946). Manon is also a minor character in Max Phillips's 2001 novel The Artist's Wife, based on Alma Mahler's life.

Manon's half-sister, the sculptor Anna Mahler, produced a marker for her grave—a young woman holding an hourglass—but the Anschluss prevented it from being installed. The statue was later destroyed in an air raid. Manon's grave lacked a permanent marker until the 1950s, when Walter Gropius designed the flat, triangular marker and landscaping.
