= Frederick Charles Adler =

English-German conductor (1889–1959)

Frederick Charles Adler (usually known as F. Charles Adler) (born on 2 July 1889 in London and died 16 February 1959 in Vienna) was an English-German conductor.

Adler studied with Gustav Mahler and served as chorus master at the premiere of Mahler's Eighth Symphony. He was held at Ruhleben internment camp during World War I. He worked as a conductor in Germany in the 1920s, and emigrated to the U.S. in 1933. He made many recordings of the works of Mahler and Anton Bruckner. He made the first commercial recordings of Mahler's Third and Sixth symphonies. His recordings of Bruckner symphonies are unusual in that they use the first published editions rather than the later critical editions. (Hans Knappertsbusch was the only other major conductor to stick with the first editions consistently.) His recording of Bruckner's Sixth Symphony was, until 2008, the only recording ever made of the 1899 first published edition. His recording of Bruckner's Ninth Symphony is one of only two to use the first edition prepared by Ferdinand Löwe in 1903 following Bruckner's death.

Adler also promoted much modern music, both in the SPA Music Festival he led in Saratoga Springs, New York and for various record labels (including SPA, Unicorn, and CRI). Adler's recordings were made in Vienna, mostly with the Vienna Symphony Orchestra under a variety of pseudonyms for contractual reasons (e.g., Vienna Philharmonia Orchestra, Vienna Orchestra, Vienna Konzertverein).

== Recording premieres ==
- Gustav Mahler, Third Symphony, Hilde Rössel-Majdan (contralto), choirs, Vienna Symphony Orchestra, 27 April 1952, SPA Records.
- Gustav Mahler, Sixth Symphony, Vienna Symphony Orchestra, 7 April 1953, SPA Records.
- Charles Ives, Second Symphony, Vienna Symphony Orchestra, 11 January 1953, SPA Records.
