= Music Survey =

- Discipline: Music
- Language: English

Publication details
- History: 1947-1952

Standard abbreviations
- ISO 4: Music Surv.

Music Survey was a short-lived academic journal covering classical and contemporary music, which flourished in the United Kingdom for a brief period after World War II. Though it was published for only five years and in that time had only a small circulation, it had a remarkable impact on British musical and musicological life in the 1950s, and was instrumental in providing a home for the time's pro-Benjamin Britten and pro-Arnold Schoenberg writing, as well as launching the critical and editorial careers of Donald Mitchell and Hans Keller.

The journal was established in 1947, while Mitchell was a teacher at Oakfield School, Dulwich, South London, by the headmaster W.W. (David) Livingston. Keller joined him as co-editor in 1949, when the journal was re-launched in the form of the so-called 'New Series'. Several articles were written by prominent composers such as Luigi Dallapiccola, Mátyás Seiber, and Robert Simpson.

Music Survey ceased publication in 1952; in 1981 a single-volume reprint of the 'New Series' was produced.

== Bibliography ==
- Music Survey: New Series, 1949-52. Collected reprint (1 volume; Faber and Faber, London) 1981.
