= Alma Mahler =

Austrian composer (1879–1964)

- Mahler in 1909
- Born: Alma Margaretha Maria Schindler; 31 August 1879; Vienna, Austria-Hungary
- Died: 11 December 1964 (aged 85); New York City, US
- Burial place: Grinzing Cemetery, Vienna
- Citizenship: Austria; United States (from 1946)
- Occupations: Composer; socialite; author; editor
- Spouses: Gustav Mahler (m. 1902; died 1911) Walter Gropius (m. 1915; div. 1920) Franz Werfel (m. 1929; died 1945)
- Children: 4, including Anna and Manon

Alma Mahler-Werfel (born Alma Margaretha Maria Schindler; 31 August 1879 – 11 December 1964) was an Austrian composer, author, editor, and socialite. Musically active from her early years, she became a fixture of Vienna's fin de siècle cultural scene, and struck up friendships and relationships with a number of notable artists and composers.

Alma was trained in composition by Max Burckhard, but ceased her compositional activity in 1902, when she married composer Gustav Mahler, who died in 1911. Between 1911 and 1914 she had a passionate affair with Oskar Kokoschka. In 1915, Alma married Walter Gropius, and they had a daughter, Manon Gropius. Throughout her marriage to Gropius, Alma engaged in an affair with Franz Werfel. Following her separation from Gropius, Alma and Werfel eventually married.

In 1938, after Nazi Germany annexed Austria, Werfel and Alma fled to France, as it was unsafe for the Jewish Werfel in Austria. In 1940, they escaped via Spain and Portugal to the US. Eventually, the couple settled in Los Angeles. In later years, her salon became part of the artistic scene (as before in Vienna), first in Los Angeles, then in New York.

== Early years ==
Alma Maria Schindler was born on 31 August 1879 in Vienna, Austria, (then Austria-Hungary) to the famous landscape painter Emil Jakob Schindler and his wife Anna Sofie. She was tutored at home and brought up in the Catholic Church. In 1886, Crown Prince Rudolf found interest in Emil Jakob Schindler's paintings and commissioned Schindler to take a trip with his family to the Adriatic coast to produce landscape paintings. In 1892, the family also traveled to the North Sea island of Sylt, where Emil Schindler died.

After her father's death, Alma focused on the piano. She studied composition and counterpoint with Josef Labor, a blind organist who introduced her to a "great deal of literature". At 15, she was sent to school but attended for only a few months. As she grew older, a case of childhood measles left her with decreased hearing. Max Burckhard, a friend of Emil Schindler and director of Vienna's Burgtheater theater, became Alma's mentor. On Alma's 17th birthday, Burckhard gave her two laundry baskets full of books. In 1895, Anna Schindler, Alma's mother, married Carl Moll, Emil Schindler's student. In 1899 they had a daughter together named Maria.

Alma met Gustav Klimt through Carl Moll. Moll and Klimt were both founding members of the Vienna Secession, "a group organized for the purpose of breaking with Vienna's tradition-bound Imperial Academy of the visual arts". Klimt fell in love with Alma. While she initially was interested in Klimt, her desire cooled soon after. Klimt and Alma were friends until Klimt's death. In autumn 1900, Alma began studying composition with Alexander von Zemlinsky. Zemlinsky and Alma fell in love and kept their relationship a secret.

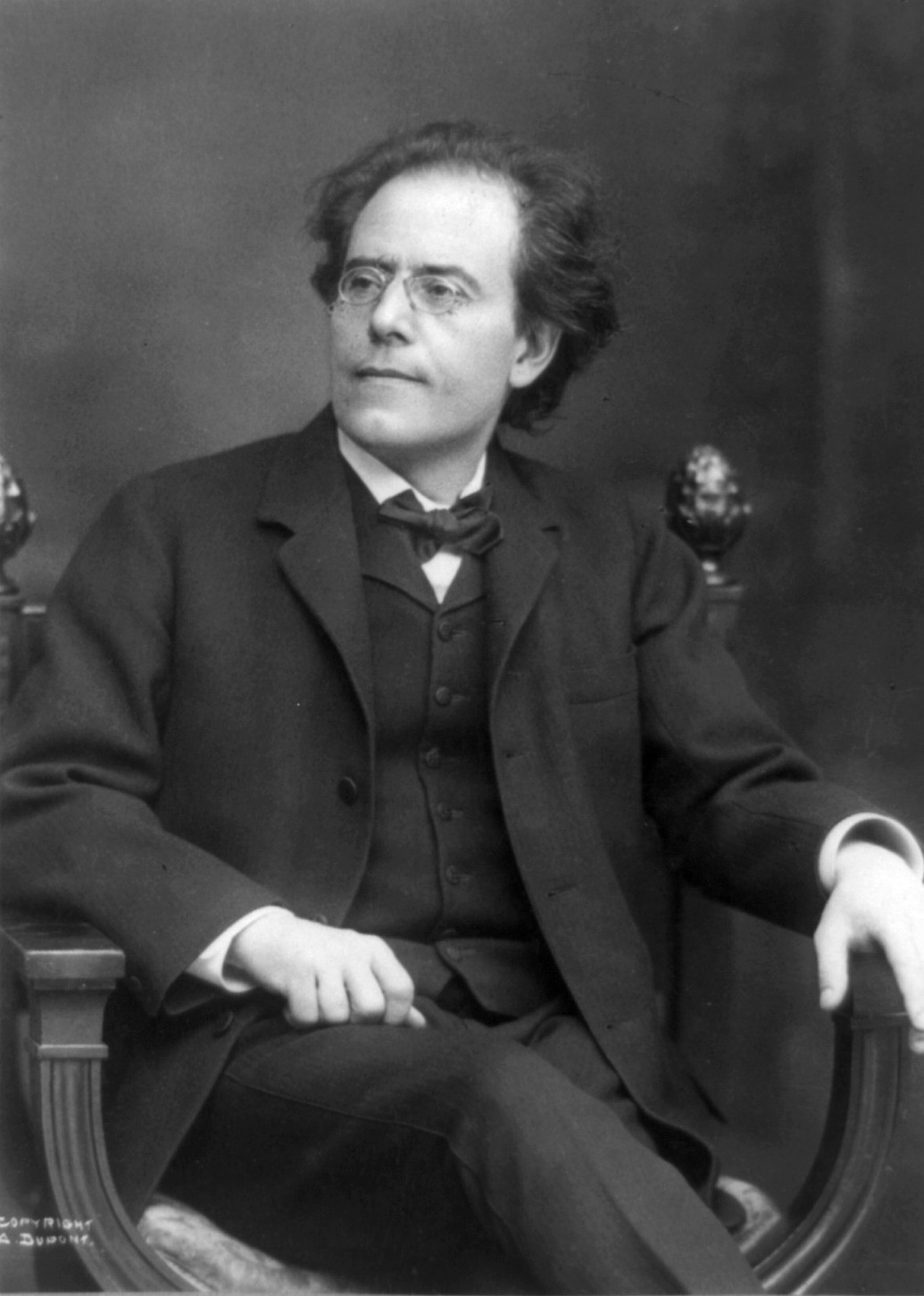
Gustav Mahler in 1909

Alma teased Zemlinsky about what she thought were his ugly features, saying she could easily have "ten others" to replace him. She also noted that to marry Zemlinsky would mean she would "bring short, degenerate Jew-children into the world". As the relationship grew strained, Zemlinsky visited her less and less. On 7 November 1901, she attended Zuckerkandl's salon where she began a flirtation with Gustav Mahler. In the month of November, while still in a relationship with Zemlinsky, she started an affair with Mahler. By 8 December, Mahler and Alma secretly were engaged; however, it was not until 12 December that she wrote to Zemlinsky about her engagement. The engagement was formally announced on 23 December.

== As a composer ==
Alma played the piano from childhood and in her memoir (Mein Leben), reports that she first attempted composing at age eight in the beginning of 1888 on the Greek island of Corfu. She studied composition with Josef Labor beginning in 1894 or 1895 and until 1901. She met Alexander von Zemlinsky in early 1900, began composition lessons with him that fall, and continued as his student until her engagement to Gustav Mahler in December 1901, after which she ceased composing. Until this time, she had composed or sketched mostly Lieder, but around 20 piano pieces and a small number of chamber music works, and a scene from an opera. She briefly resumed composing in 1910, but stopped in 1915. The chronology of her compositions is difficult to establish because she did not date her manuscripts and destroyed many of them herself. Attempts to establish a chronological list of her works have been made by Susanne Rode-Breymann in 1999 and 2014 and by Knud Martner in 2018.

A total of 17 songs by her survive. Fourteen were published during her lifetime in three publications dated 1910, 1915, and 1924. The first two volumes appeared under the name Alma Maria Schindler-Mahler, and the last volume was published as "Fünf Gesänge" by Alma Maria Mahler; the cover of the 1915 set was illustrated by Oskar Kokoschka. Three additional songs were discovered in manuscripts posthumously; two of them were published in the year 2000, edited by Susan M. Filler, and one published in 2018, edited by Barry Millington. Her personal papers, including music manuscripts, are held at the University of Pennsylvania, the Austrian National Library in Vienna, and the Bavarian State Library in Munich. These songs have been performed and recorded regularly since the 1980s. Orchestral versions of the accompaniments have been produced. Seven songs were orchestrated by David and Colin Matthews (published by Universal Edition), and all 17 songs were orchestrated by Julian Reynolds, and by Jorma Panula. In recent decades, Mahler's compositions have received renewed scholarly attention, particularly through feminist musicology.

== Works ==
Compositions cited from Mahler, A Complete Songs unless otherwise noted.

- Five Songs for voice and piano (published in January 1911)
  - (i) Die stille Stadt (The Quiet Town; Richard Dehmel)
  - (ii) In meines Vaters Garten (In My Father's Garden; Erich Otto Hartleben)
    Note: The original poem is entitled Französisches Wiegenlied or Volkslied, and was composed between May and August 1899.
  - (iii) Laue Sommernacht (Mild Summer's Night; Bierbaum)
    Note: The original title of the poem is Gefunden.
  - (iv) Bei dir ist es traut (With You It Is Pleasant; Rilke)
  - (v) Ich wandle unter Blumen (I Stroll Among Flowers; Heine)
- Four Songs for voice and piano (published in June 1915)
  - (i) Licht in der Nacht (Light in the Night; Bierbaum)
  - (ii) Waldseligkeit (Woodland Bliss; Dehmel)
  - (iii) Ansturm (Storm; Dehmel)
  - (iv) Erntelied (Harvest Song; Gustav Falke)The original title is Gesang am Morgen (Song at Dawn).
- Five Songs for voice and piano (published in April 1924) (Note: Nos. 1, 3 and 4 were orchestrated by Paul von Klenau and/or Alban Berg in 1924 and were premiered in Vienna on 22 September 1924 by tenor Laurenz Hofer and conductor Leopold Reichwein. The songs were performed again at a broadcast in the Vienna Radio on 17 February 1929 by tenor Anton Maria Topitz and conductor Rudolf Nilius. On this occasion an interview with Alma Mahler was broadcast. Scores and parts are presumably lost.)
  - (i) Hymne (Hymn; Novalis)
  - (ii) Ekstase (Ecstasy; Bierbaum)
  - (iii) Der Erkennende (The Recognizer; Werfel)
  - (iv) Lobgesang (Song of Praise; Dehmel)
  - (v) Hymne an die Nacht (Hymn to the Night; Novalis)

Posthumously published

  - Leise weht ein erstes Blühn (Softly Drifts a First Blossom; Rilke), for voice and piano (published 2000 by Susan M. Filler)
  - Kennst du meine Nächte? (Do You Know My Nights?; Leo Greiner), for voice and piano (published 2000 by Susan M. Filler)
  - Einsamer Gang (Lonely Walk, Leo Greiner), for voice and piano (published London 2018 by Barry Millington)

== Marriage to Gustav Mahler ==
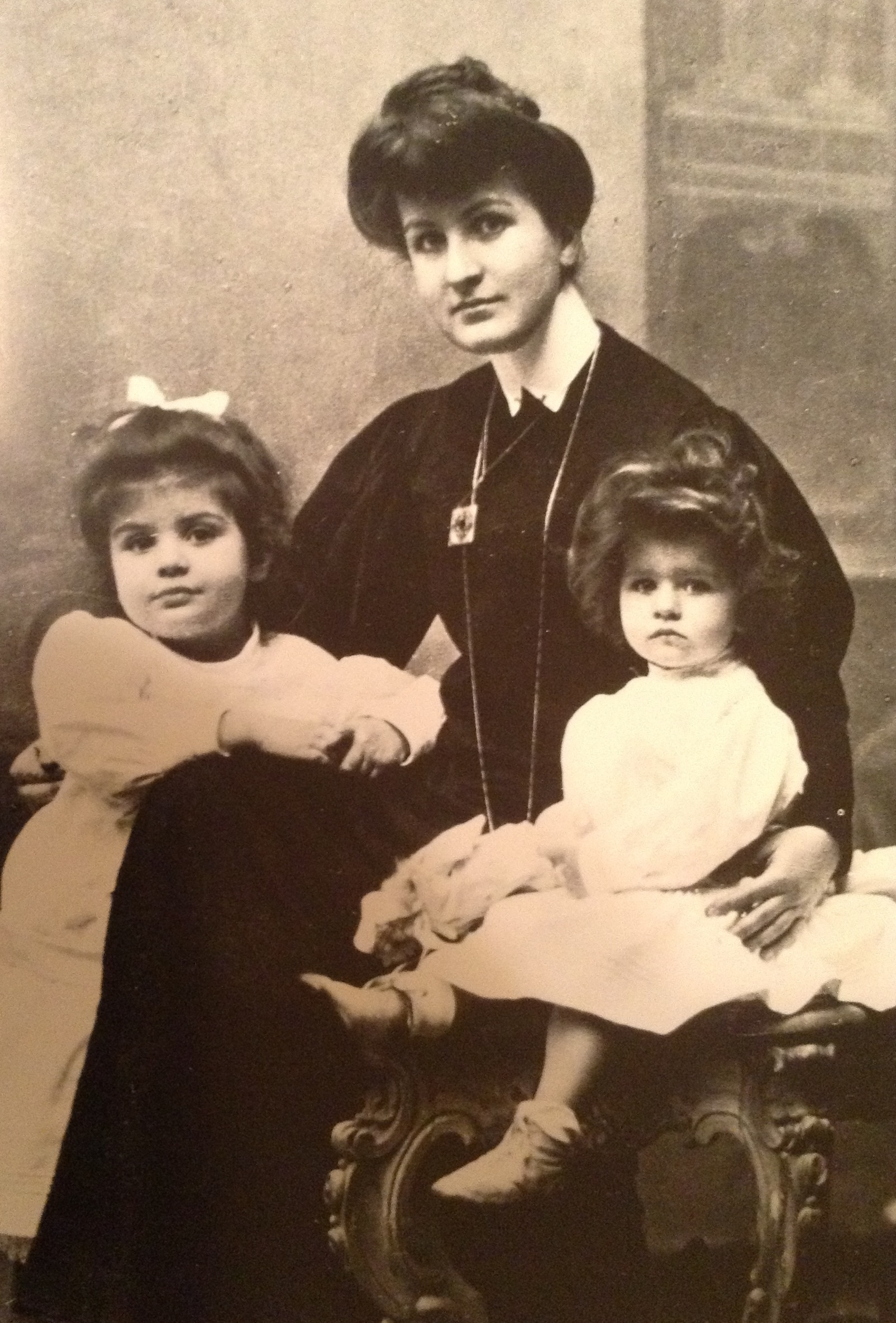
Alma Mahler and the daughters Maria (at left) and Anna (at right) with her first husband Gustav Mahler; cabinet card photo c. 1906

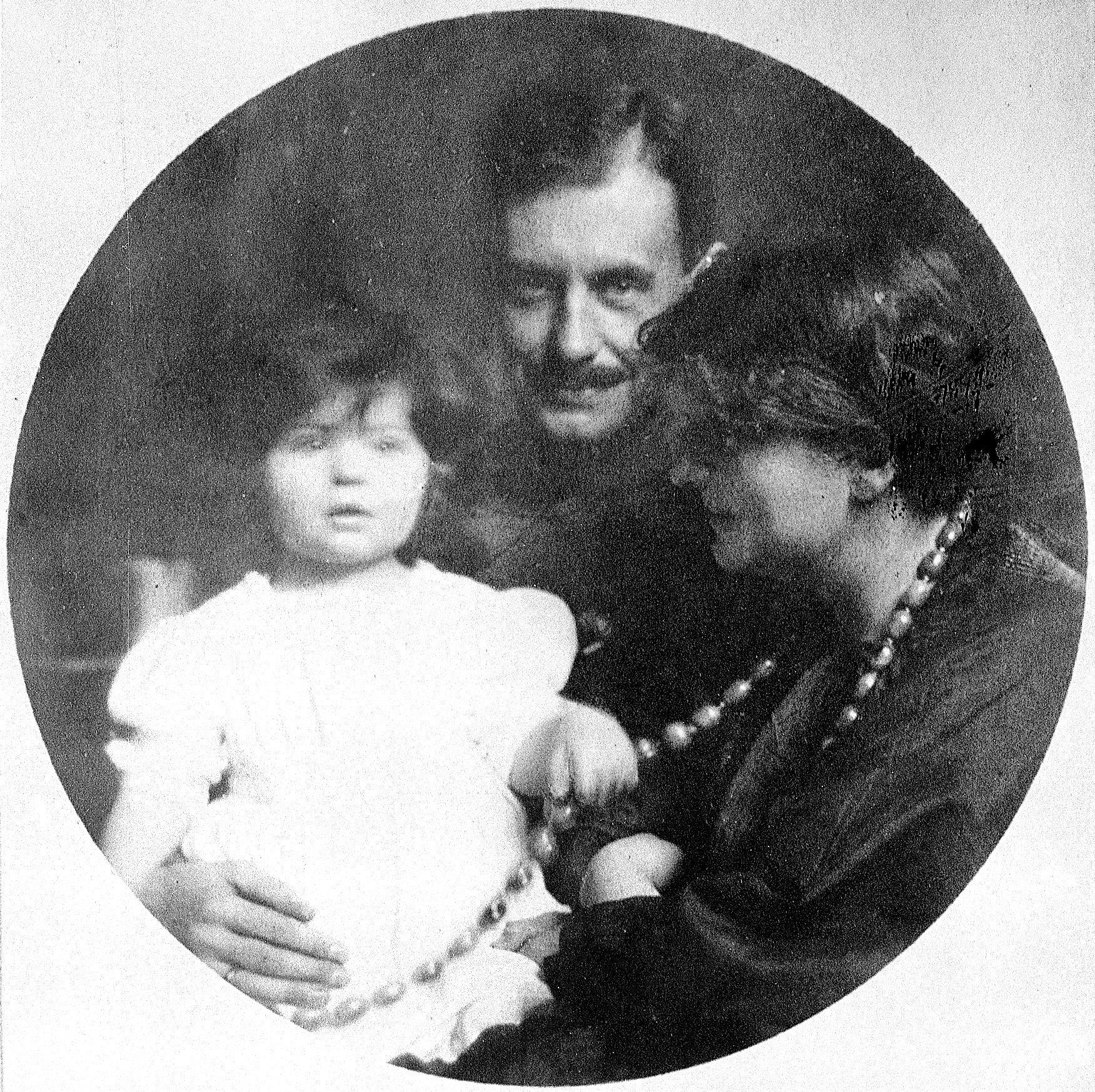
Walter Gropius and Alma Mahler with their daughter Manon (1918)

On 9 March 1902, she married Gustav Mahler, who was 19 years her senior and the director of the Vienna Court Opera. With him she had two daughters, Maria Anna (1902–1907), who died of scarlet fever or diphtheria, and Anna (1904–1988), who later became a sculptor. Gustav was not interested in Alma's compositions, desiring her to abandon composing. Although one scholar disputes whether or not Gustav outright forbade Alma Mahler to compose, the lengthy letter Gustav sent her on 19 December 1901 is emphatic that she must give up composing, and Alma did artistically stifle herself and embraced the role of a loving wife and supporter of her husband's music.

In June 1910, after becoming severely depressed in the wake of Maria's death, Alma began an affair with the young architect Walter Gropius (later head of the Bauhaus), whom she met during a rest at a spa. Gustav sought advice from Sigmund Freud in August. The 2010 film Mahler on the Couch suggests that Gustav's consultations with Freud might have focused on his curtailing of Alma's musical career as a major marital obstacle, but the actual content of these meetings is not known.

Following the emotional crisis in their marriage after Gustav's discovery of Alma's affair with Gropius, Gustav began to take a serious interest in Alma's musical compositions, regretting his earlier dismissive attitude and taking promotional actions. Gustav edited some of her songs (Die stille Stadt, In meines Vaters Garten, Laue Sommernacht, Bei dir ist es traut, Ich wandle unter Blumen). Upon his urging and under his guidance, Alma prepared five of her songs for publication (they were issued in 1910, by Gustav's own publisher, Universal Edition).

In February 1911, Gustav fell severely ill with an infection related to a heart defect that had been diagnosed several years earlier. He died on 18 May.

== Relationship with Walter Gropius ==
After Gustav's death, Alma did not immediately resume contact with Gropius. From 1911 to 1912, she had an affair with Paul Kammerer, a controversial Austrian biologist known for his experiments on living amphibians such as olms and midwife toads. She even served as his laboratory assistant for a time. Between 1912 and 1914 she had a tumultuous affair with the artist Oskar Kokoschka, who created works inspired by their relationship, including his painting The Bride of the Wind. Kokoschka's possessiveness wore on Alma, and the emotional vicissitudes of the relationship tired them both.

With the coming of World War I, Kokoschka enlisted in the Austro-Hungarian Army. Alma subsequently distanced herself from Kokoschka and resumed contact with Walter Gropius, who was also serving in combat at that time. She and Gropius married on 18 August 1915 in Berlin during one of his military leaves. They had a daughter together, Manon Gropius (1916–1935), who grew up being friends with Maria Altmann. After Manon died of polio at the age of 18, composer Alban Berg dedicated his newly composed Violin Concerto to her, "In Memory of an Angel".

Alma became pregnant and gave birth to a son, Martin Carl Johannes Gropius (1918–1919). Gropius at first believed that the child was his, but Alma's ongoing affair with Franz Werfel was common knowledge in Vienna by this time. Within a year, Alma and Gropius agreed to a divorce. In the meantime, Martin, who had been born prematurely, developed hydrocephalus and died at 10 months. Alma's divorce from Gropius became final in October 1920.

== Relationship with Franz Werfel ==
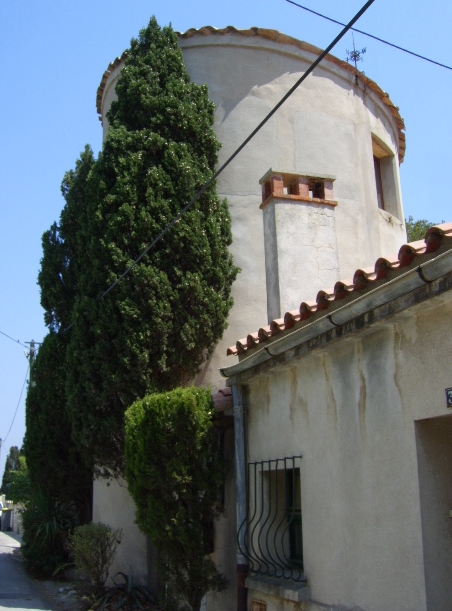
House of Franz Werfel and Alma Mahler in Sanary-sur-Mer

While Gropius's military duties were still keeping him absent, Alma met and began an affair with Prague-born poet and writer Franz Werfel in the fall of 1917. She and Werfel began openly living together after her divorce from Gropius. However, she postponed marrying Werfel until 1929, after which she took the name Alma Mahler-Werfel.

In 1938, following the Anschluss, Alma and Werfel, who was Jewish, were forced to flee Austria for France; they maintained a household in Sanary-sur-Mer on the French Riviera from the summer of 1938 until the spring of 1940. With the German invasion and occupation of France during World War II and the deportation of Jews and political adversaries to Nazi concentration camps, the couple were no longer safe in France and frantically sought to secure their emigration to the United States. In Marseille, they were contacted by Varian Fry, an American journalist and emissary of the Emergency Rescue Committee, a private American relief organization that aided refugee intellectuals and artists at that time.

As exit visas could not be obtained, Fry and Unitarian Waitstill Sharp arranged for the Werfels to journey on foot across the Pyrenees into Spain to evade the Vichy French border officials. From Spain, Alma and Franz traveled to Portugal. They stayed in Monte Estoril, at the Grande Hotel D'Itália, between 8 September and 4 October 1940. On the same day, they boarded the S.S. Nea Hellas headed for New York City, arriving on 13 October.

Eventually they settled in Los Angeles, where Alma continued her role as a hostess, bringing together Arnold Schoenberg, Igor Stravinsky, Thomas Mann, and many other artists. Werfel, who had enjoyed moderate renown in the US as an author, achieved popular success with his novel The Song of Bernadette, and the science fiction novel Star of the Unborn, published after his death. Werfel, who had experienced serious heart problems throughout his exile, died of a heart attack in California in 1945.

== Cultural icon in the US ==
In 1946, Mahler-Werfel became a US citizen. Several years later she moved to New York City, where she remained a cultural figure. Leonard Bernstein, who was a champion of Gustav Mahler's music, stated in his Charles Eliot Norton lectures of 1973 that Mahler-Werfel had attended some of his rehearsals. Benjamin Britten, considering her to be a "living" link to both Mahler and Alban Berg, dedicated his Nocturne for Tenor and Small Orchestra to her. In 1951 Alma Mahler-Werfel moved to New York, where she had purchased four small condominiums in a house on the Upper East Side (120 East 73rd Street). She lived herself on the third floor and used one apartment as a living room, the second as a bedroom.

== Death ==
Alma Mahler by Oskar Kokoschka, 1912

Alma Mahler-Werfel died 11 December 1964 in New York City. She was survived by her only surviving child, her daughter Anna, and two granddaughters. She was buried on 8 February 1965 in the Grinzing Cemetery of Vienna in the same grave as her daughter Manon Gropius and a few steps away from Gustav Mahler.

== Nazi-looted art ==
In 1999, Mahler-Werfel's granddaughter requested that five artworks seized under the Nazis be restored to the family. The paintings were A Summer's Night on the Beach (1902) by Edvard Munch and three landscapes by her great-grandfather Emil Jakob Schindler. Alma Werfel had loaned the paintings to the Oesterreichische Galerie before fleeing the Nazis; Carl Moll, a militant Nazi, gained control of them, selling the Munch to the Oesterreichische Galerie in 1940 and keeping the others until, fearing retribution from the Red Army, he committed suicide. Mahler-Werfel filed claims after the war but was only able to recover the Kokoschka portrait. When Austria modified its restrictive restitution laws, the granddaughter revived the claims. Austria initially rejected the claim. After a restitution battle that lasted six decades, Austria finally agreed to restitute the stolen Munch in 2006.

== The Alma Problem ==
Mahler-Werfel's two books on Gustav Mahler influenced studies of the latter. As an articulate, well-connected, and influential woman who outlived her first husband by more than 50 years, Mahler-Werfel was for decades treated as the main authority on the mature Gustav Mahler's values, character, and day-to-day behavior, and her various publications quickly became the central source material for Mahler scholars and music-lovers alike. As scholars investigated her depiction of Mahler and her relationship with him, her accounts have increasingly been revealed as unreliable, false, and misleading. Nevertheless, the deliberate distortions have had a significant influence on several generations of scholars, interpreters, and music-lovers.

Citing the serious contradictions between Alma's accounts and other evidence, including her own diaries, several historians and biographers began to speak of the Alma Problem. According to Hugh Wood: "Often she is the only witness, and the biographer has to depend on her while doubting with every sentence her capacity for telling the truth. Everything that passed through her hands must be regarded as tainted". Countering this stance is that of musicologist Nancy Newman, whose study provides a "theoretical foundation" that "grounds extensive critique of both the conventions of fin-de-siècle Vienna and the chauvinism of late twentieth-century scholars."

== In popular culture ==
American satirist Tom Lehrer described her obituary as the "juiciest, spiciest, raciest" obituary he had ever read. It prompted him to write the ballad, "Alma", portraying her as "the loveliest girl in Vienna ... the smartest as well". Lehrer writes, "All modern women are jealous" of her "for bagging Gustav and Walter and Franz", each of whom came under her "spell".

In the 1974 film Mahler, by director Ken Russell, Gustav Mahler, while on his last train journey, remembers the important events of his life, such as his relationship with his wife, the deaths of his brother and young daughter, and his trouble with the muses. In the film, Alma was portrayed by Georgina Hale and Gustav by Robert Powell.

In 1996, Israeli writer Joshua Sobol and Austrian director Paulus Manker created the polydrama Alma. It played in Vienna for six successive seasons and toured with over 400 performances to Venice, Lisbon, Los Angeles, Petronell, Berlin, Semmering, Jerusalem, and Prague—all places where Mahler-Werfel had lived. The show was made into a three-part TV miniseries in 1997.

Mohammed Fairouz set the words of Alma Mahler in his song cycle Jeder Mensch. It premiered in a coupling with songs of Alma Mahler by mezzo-soprano Kate Lindsey in 2011.

A treatment of Mahler-Werfel's life was presented in the 2001 Bruce Beresford film Bride of the Wind, in which Alma was played by Australian actress Sarah Wynter. Gustav Mahler was portrayed by British actor Jonathan Pryce. Swiss actor Vincent Pérez portrayed Oskar Kokoschka.

In 1998, extracts from Alma's diaries were published, covering the years from 1898 to 1902, until the time she married Mahler. In the 2001 novel The Artist's Wife by Max Phillips, she tells her story from the afterlife, focusing on her complicated relationships.

In 2010, the German filmmaker Percy Adlon and his son Felix Adlon released their film Mahler auf der Couch (Mahler on the Couch), which relates Gustav Mahler's tormented relationship with his wife, Alma, and his meeting with Sigmund Freud in 1910. In the film's introduction, the directors state, "That it happened is fact. How it happened is fiction."

Alma appears in chapter 6, "Montredon" of the 2019 novel, The Flight Portfolio, by Julie Orringer. She and Werfel are depicted meeting with Varian Fry to discuss the arrangements Fry is trying to make in order to effect their escape from France.

Roz Chast, drew a comic serial entitled "The Inescapable Thingness" in The New Yorker online magazine regarding the doll that Oskar Kokoschka commissioned Hermine Moos to make of Alma after their affair had ended.

== See also ==
- The Holocaust in Austria
- Henriette Amalie Lieser
