= Donald Mitchell (writer) =

British writer (1925–2017)

Donald Charles Peter Mitchell CBE (6 February 1925 – 28 September 2017) was a British writer on music, particularly known for his books on Gustav Mahler and Benjamin Britten and for the book The Language of Modern Music, published in 1963.

== Life and career ==
Mitchell was born in London on 6 February 1925, and educated at Brightlands Preparatory School and Dulwich College, London. In 1943 he registered as a conscientious objector and his war-time service was spent in the Non-Combatant Corps. After the war, he taught at Oakfield Preparatory School, London and in 1947 founded and edited the journal Music Survey; several issues appeared before he was joined in 1949 by Hans Keller and the journal was re-launched in the Music Survey's so-called 'New Series' (1949–52), whose uncompromising critical standards and pugnaciously pro-Britten and pro-Schoenberg stance brought it renown and notoriety in equal measure. Mitchell studied at Durham University 1949–50.

In the 1950s he was a regular contributor to the journals Musical Times and Musical Opinion. In 1958 he became editor of Music Books at Faber and Faber and in the same year was appointed Editor of Boosey & Hawkes's music journal Tempo, until 1962. From 1963 to 1964 he was a special music adviser at Boosey & Hawkes with particular responsibility for contemporary music and the acquisition of contemporary composers. He was responsible for Peter Maxwell Davies and Nicholas Maw joining the publisher's list. In 1965, with the encouragement of Benjamin Britten he founded the music-publishing firm of Faber Music, and was its first managing director (vice-chairman, 1976, chairman, 1977, president, 1988–95).

In 1972 Mitchell became the first Professor of Music at Sussex University (until 1976). Following the death of Benjamin Britten, he became a senior trustee of the Britten-Pears Foundation; in 1986 he became the Foundation's director and chairman of the Britten Estate Ltd. From 1989 to 1992 he was chairman of the Performing Right Society. He was appointed a CBE in the 2000 New Year Honours, and died on 28 September 2017, at the age of 92.

== Mahler and Britten ==
Mitchell's two major written projects were a four-volume exploration of the music of Gustav Mahler (Faber), and as Editor-in-Chief of six volume edition of the letters of Benjamin Britten (Faber and Boydell Press). Although Mitchell did not work on the fifth and final volumes he appears extensively in them as a Britten correspondent.

By his own admission, Mitchell's work on Mahler was not principally as a work of biography (he cited Henry-Louis de La Grange's four-volume work as the standard), but rather a series of extended essays, often personal in nature. Across the four volumes Mitchell presented analyses of Mahler's work, grouped loosely into early works (vol. 1), Wunderhorn works (vol. 2) and later works (vols. 3 and 4).

== Selected writings ==
- (ed., with Hans Keller): Benjamin Britten: A Commentary on His Works from a Group of Specialists (London, Rockliff, 1952). With drawings by Milein Cosman
- (ed., with H.C. Robbins Landon): The Mozart Companion (London: Rockliff, 1956)
- (ed., with Philip Reed and Mervyn Cooke): Letters From a Life: The Selected Letters of Benjamin Britten. 6 vols., Faber (vols 1–3), Boydell Press (vols 4–6) 1991–2012
- Benjamin Britten: Death in Venice (Cambridge University Press, 1987) ISBN 978-0-521-31943-0
- Britten and Auden in the Thirties: The Year 1936 (Boydell Press, 2nd Ed., 2000)
- Gustav Mahler: The Early Years. Rockliff, 1958 (revised as Gustav Mahler, Vol 1: The Early Years with Paul Banks and David Matthews, Faber 1978)
- The Language of Modern Music (Faber & Faber, 1963, revised 1966, 1969) ISBN 0-571-04934-6
- Gustav Mahler, Vol. 2: The Wunderhorn Years: Chronicles and Commentaries. (Faber 1975)
- Gustav Mahler, Vol. 3: Songs and Symphonies of Life and Death: Interpretations and Annotations. (Faber 1985)
- Discovering Mahler. Writings on Gustav Mahler 1955-2005. (Boydell Press 2007) ISBN 978-1-84383-345-1
- The Mahler Companion. (Oxford, 1999) (online at Google Books)
