= Anna Mahler =

Austrian sculptor (1904–1988)

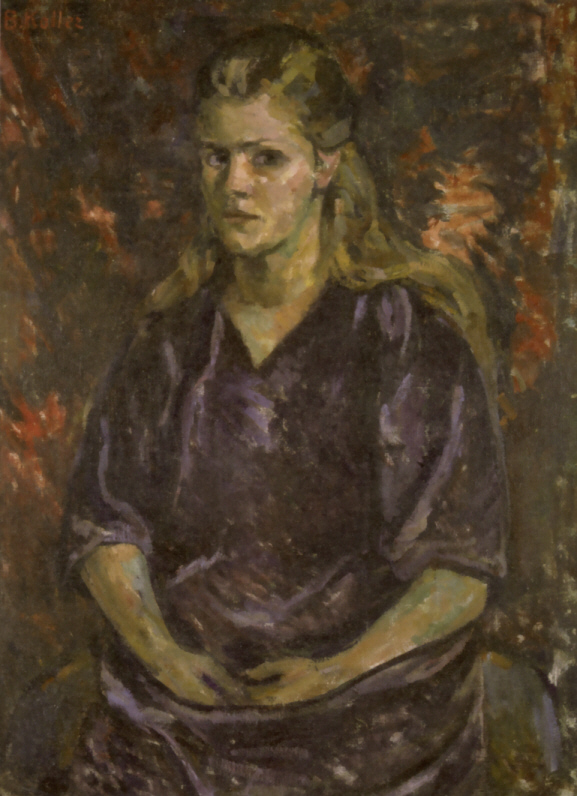
- Anna Mahler by Broncia Koller-Pinell, 1921
- Born: Anna Justine Mahler; 15 June 1904; Vienna, Austria
- Died: 3 June 1988 (aged 83); Hampstead, London, England
- Resting place: Highgate Cemetery, London
- Known for: Sculpture
- Spouses: Rupert Koller (m. 1920–1921) Ernst Krenek (m. 1924; div. 1925) Paul Zsolnay (m. 1929; div. 1934) Anatole Fistoulari (m. 1943–1956) Albrecht Joseph (m. 1969; sep. 1978)
- Children: 2
- Parents: Gustav Mahler; Alma Mahler

Anna Justine Mahler (15 June 1904 – 3 June 1988) was an Austrian sculptor.

== Early life ==
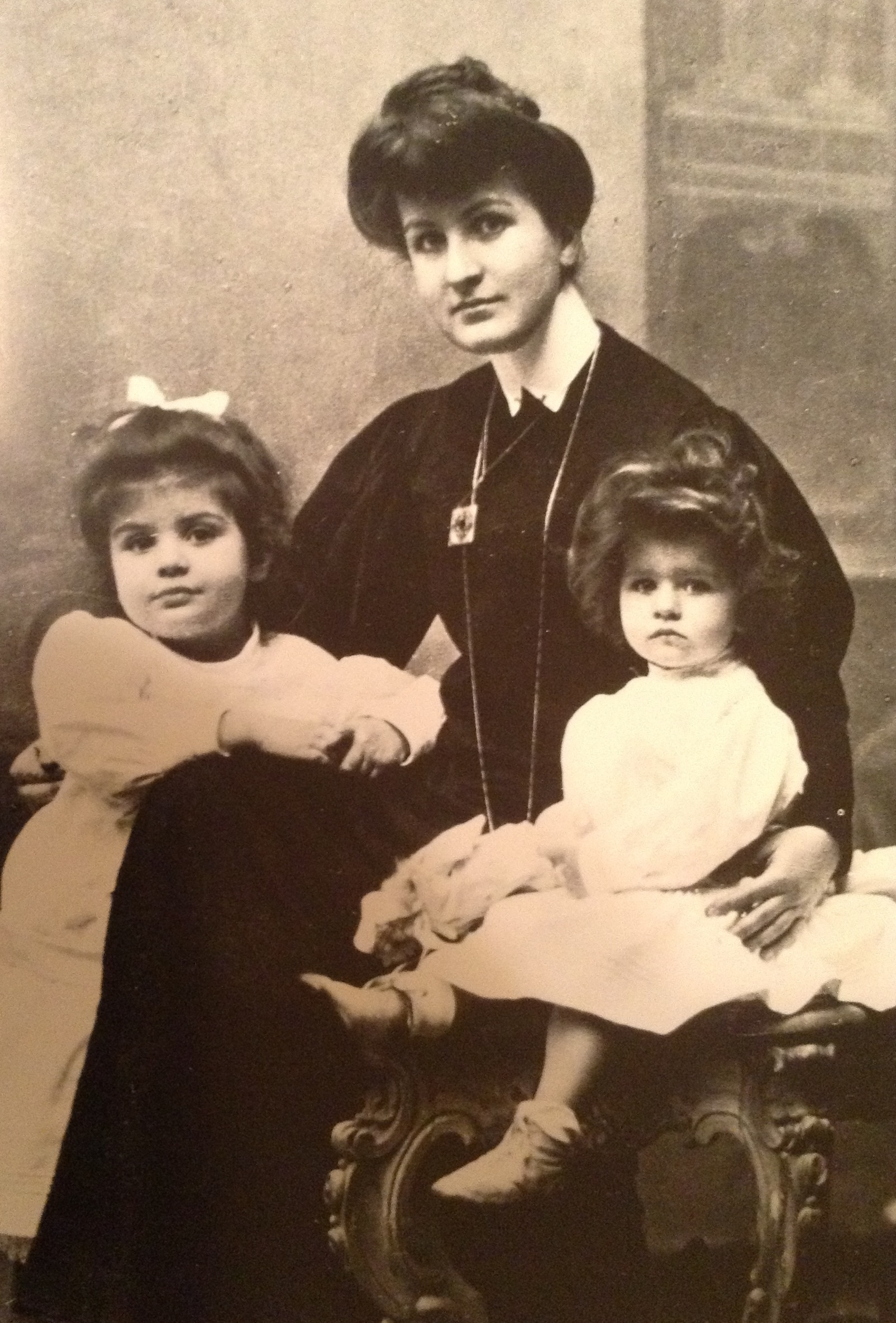
Anna Mahler (at right) with her older sister Maria and her mother, carte de visite cabinet card photo circa 1906

Born in Vienna, Anna Mahler was the second child of the composer Gustav Mahler and his wife Alma Schindler. They nicknamed her 'Gucki' on account of her big blue eyes (gucken is German for 'to look' or 'to peep'). Her childhood was spent in the shadow of her mother’s love affairs and famous salon. Anna also suffered the loss of her elder sister Maria Mahler (1902–1907) who died of scarlet fever when Anna was three, and her father, who died when she was six. The aftermath of both tragedies coincided with her mother's love affair with the German architect Walter Gropius and her stormy relationship with the Austrian Expressionist painter Oskar Kokoschka. Alma Mahler's second marriage to Gropius, however, provided some semblance of family life during Anna’s adolescence, as well as a young half-sister, Manon Gropius (1916–1935).

Anna was educated by tutors and also enjoyed the attention of her mother's friends, including many of the important artistic figures in music, the visual arts and literature. As the daughter of the Austrian composer Gustav Mahler, Anna was expected to have a musical career, but this never materialised.

== Artistic career ==
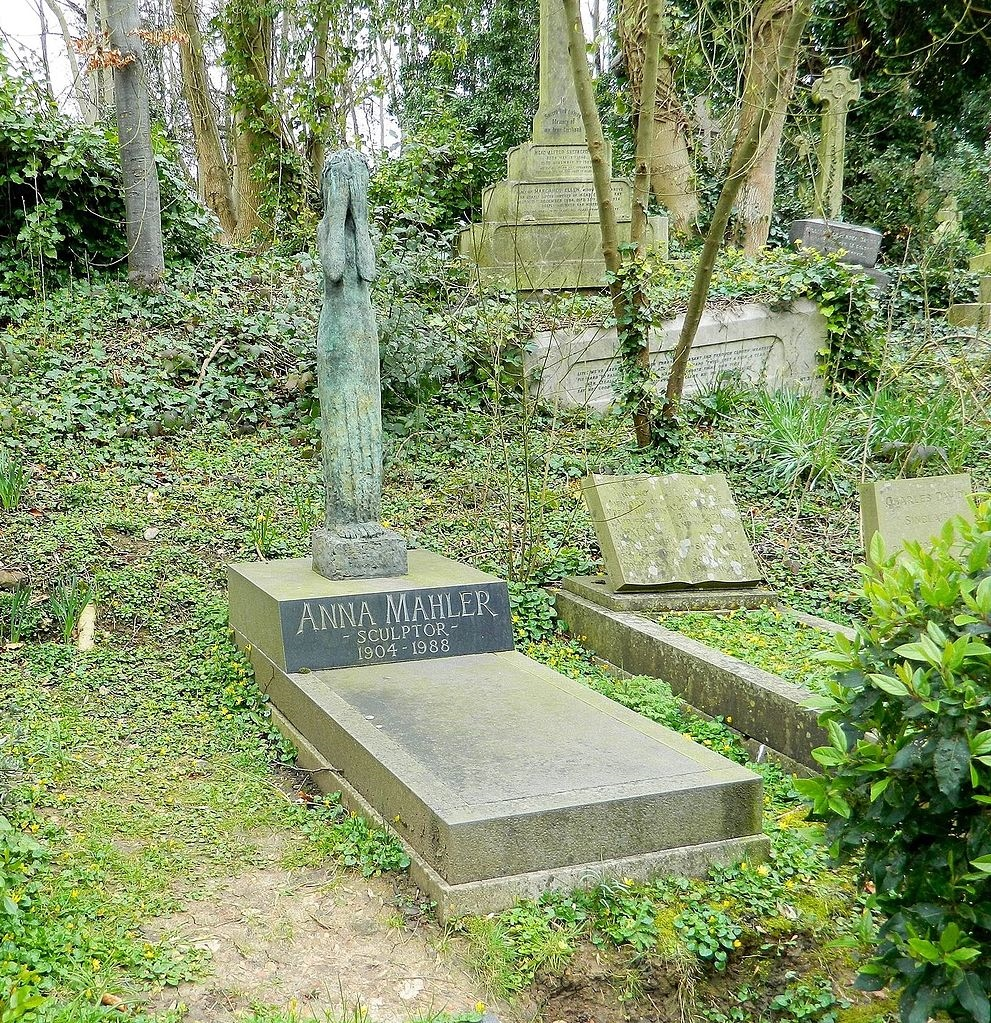
Mahler's grave in Highgate Cemetery

Anna Mahler's exposure to the visual arts began at an early age, during visits to Oskar Kokoschka's studio. She was also a model for her mother-in-law, the painter Broncia Koller-Pinell. After her divorce, Anna studied art and painting on and off in Berlin, Rome and Paris throughout the 1920s. At the age of twenty-six, she discovered that sculpture was the medium in which she could best express her creativity. Having taken lessons in sculpting in Vienna in 1930 from Fritz Wotruba, she became an established sculptor there, and was awarded the Grand Prix in Paris in 1937.

As well as sculpting successfully in stone, Anna Mahler produced bronze heads of many of the musical giants of the 20th century including Arnold Schoenberg, Alban Berg, Artur Schnabel, Otto Klemperer, Bruno Walter, Rudolf Serkin and Eileen Joyce.

== Personal life ==
At the age of 16, Anna fell in love with a rising young conductor, Rupert Koller. They were married on 2 November 1920. Their marriage ended within months.

Soon after, Anna moved to Berlin to study art. While there, she fell in love with Ernst Krenek, the composer, who later was asked by Alma to produce a neat copy of two movements from the draft of Mahler's unfinished Tenth Symphony. Anna married him on 15 January 1924, while she was still only 19 years old. Like her first marriage, this second marriage failed within months. She left Krenek permanently in November 1924. During this time, Krenek was completing his Violin Concerto No. 1, Op. 29. The Australian violinist Alma Moodie assisted Krenek in obtaining financial assistance from her Swiss patron Werner Reinhart, at whose instigation Krenek and Mahler were living in Zürich, and, in gratitude, Krenek dedicated the concerto to Moodie, who premiered it on 5 January 1925, in Dessau. Krenek's divorce from Anna Mahler was finalised a few days after the premiere, which Krenek did not attend.

Anna subsequently married publisher Paul Zsolnay on 2 December 1929, when she was 25. They had a daughter, Alma (5 November 1930 – 15 November 2010). The couple divorced in 1934, after five years.

Anna fled Nazi Austria after the Anschluss in March 1938. By April 1939, she was living in Hampstead in London and was advertising in the newspaper for pupils.

On 3 March 1943, she married conductor Anatole Fistoulari with whom she had another daughter, Marina (born 1 August 1943). After the War, she travelled to California, United States, without Fistoulari, to whom she was still married. She lived there for some years. Anna appeared on "You Bet Your Life", both the 2 January 1952 radio show, and the 3 January 1952 TV show. Her marriage to Fistoulari was dissolved around 1956.

She married her fifth husband, Albrecht Joseph (1901–1991), a Hollywood film editor and writer of screenplays, round about 1970. Mahler once said that she had found true love with her last husband but had left him at the age of seventy-five in order that they might both progress, since they spent too much time looking after each other.

After her mother died in 1964, Anna, now financially independent, returned to London for a while before finally deciding to live in Spoleto in Italy in 1969. In 1988, she died in Hampstead, while visiting her daughter Marina there. She is buried at Highgate Cemetery.
