= Max Burckhard =

Austrian theatre director (1854–1912)

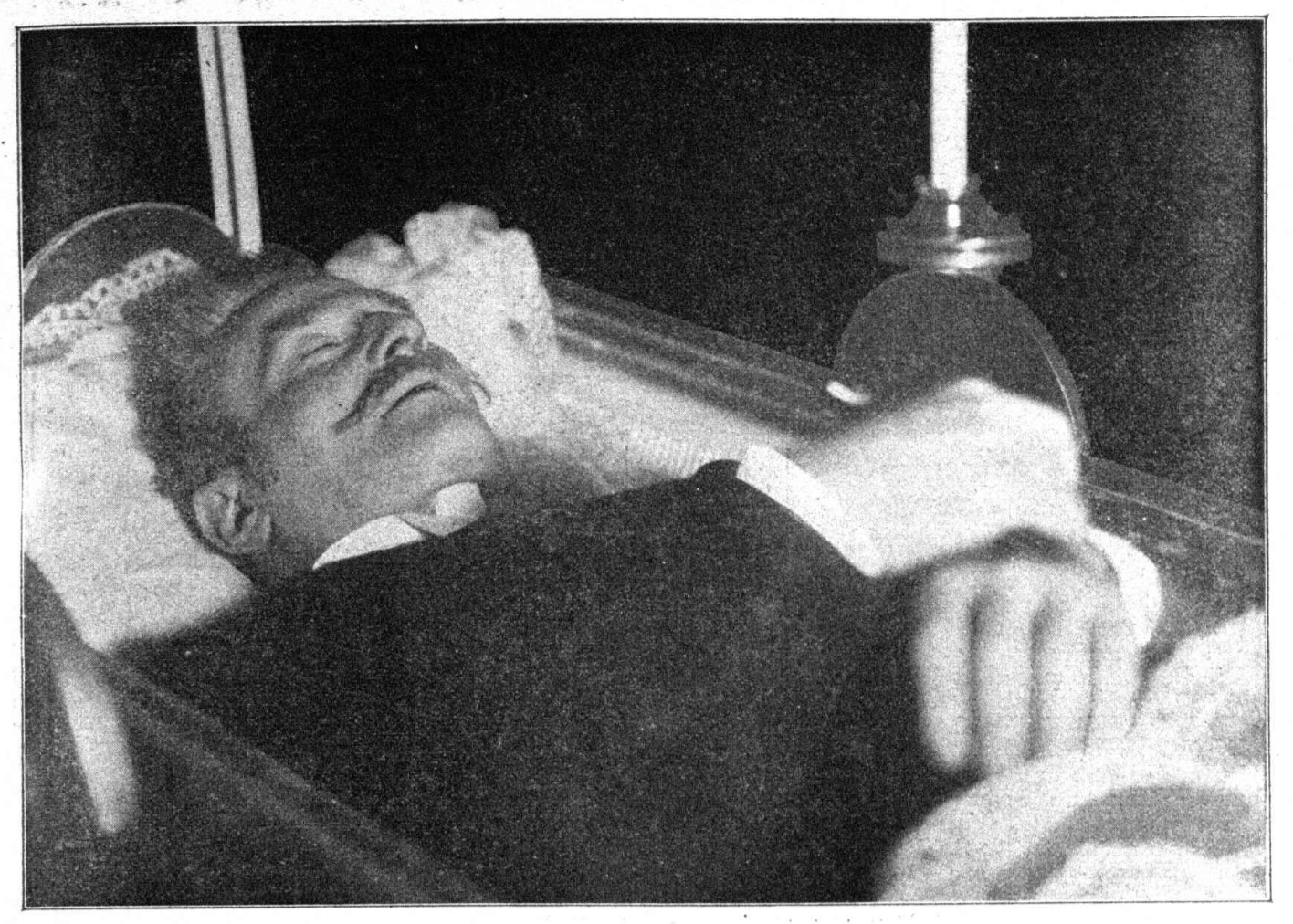
Burckhard on his deathbed

Max Eugen Burckhard (14 July 1854 – 16 March 1912) was an Austrian theatre director. He was the director of the Burgtheater, Vienna, from 1890 to 1898.

== Vita ==
Max Burckhard was born on 14 July 1854, Korneuburg, Lower Austria, Austrian Empire. He became a lawyer and then the artistic director of the Burgtheater when it opened as the "Neues Haus am Ring" on 12 May 1890. He remained director until 1898. He introduced Sunday matinees at a reduced cost to widen the theatre's potential audience. He later remarked that the less wealthy audiences were the most "critically acute". As director, he remodeled the auditorium in the spring and summer of 1897, and introduced contemporary drama by Henrik Ibsen, Gerhart Hauptmann, Arthur Schnitzler, Hugo von Hofmannsthal to the Viennese audience as well as Austrian classics of Ludwig Anzengruber and Ferdinand Raimund. He hired such famous actors as Adele Sandrock, Otto Treßler, Hedwig Bleibtreu, and Josef Kainz but was pressured to resign after having "aroused the displeasure of the Christian Social Party".

== Death ==
Burckhard died in Vienna on 16 March 1912, at the age of 57.
