= Edita Gruberová discography =

The following list notes recordings by soprano Edita Gruberová, notably in full-length operas. She also recorded extended selections from Donizetti's Tudor Queens' trilogy and other bel canto operas. More than a dozen of her filmed and televised opera appearances have been released on DVD.

Recordings with Gruberová include:

Year	Role	Other cast	Conductor Orchestra and chorus	Label
1976	Strauss; Ariadne auf Naxos (Zerbinetta)	Gundula Janowitz; Agnes Baltsa; James King; Walter Berry	Karl Böhm; Orchestra of Wiener Staatsoper; Live performance	Orfeo
1977	Strauss; Ariadne auf Naxos (Zerbinetta)	Leontyne Price; Tatiana Troyanos; René Kollo; Walter Berry; Barry McDaniel	Georg Solti; London Philharmonic Orchestra	London Records; Decca Records
1978	Mozart; Die Entführung aus dem Serail (Konstanze)	Francisco Araiza; Roland Bracht; Gudrun Ebel; Norbert Orth; Harald Leipnitz	Heinz Wallberg; Münchner Rundfunkorchester; Choir of Bayerischer Rundfunk	Eurodisc
1978	Humperdinck; Hänsel und Gretel (Taumännchen)	Lucia Popp; Julia Hamari; Walter Berry; Brigitte Fassbaender; Anny Schlemm; Norma Burrowes	Georg Solti; Wiener Philharmoniker; Wiener Sängerknaben	Decca Records
1979	Verdi; Don Carlo (four acts) (Tebaldo)	José Carreras; Mirella Freni; Agnes Baltsa; Nicolai Ghiaurov; Piero Cappuccilli; Ruggero Raimondi; José van Dam	Herbert von Karajan; Choir of Deutsche Oper Berlin, Berliner Philharmoniker	EMI Classics
1979/80	Verdi; Un ballo in maschera (Oscar)	Plácido Domingo; Renato Bruson; Katia Ricciarelli; Elena Obraztsova	Claudio Abbado; Coro e Orchestra del Teatro alla Scala	Deutsche Grammophon
1980	Mozart; Die Entführung aus dem Serail (Konstanze)	Reri Grist; Francisco Araiza; Norbert Orth; Martti Talvela	Karl Böhm; Symphonie-Orchester of Bayerischer Rundfunk; Choir of Bayerischer Rundfunk	Deutsche Grammophon DVD
1981	Mozart; Die Zauberflöte (Königin der Nacht)	Wolfgang Brendel; Roland Bracht; Lucia Popp; Brigitte Linder; Heinz Zednik; Siegfried Jerusalem	Bernard Haitink; Symphonieorchester des Bayerischen Rundfunks; Choir of Bayerischer Rundfunk, Tölzer Knabenchor	EMI Classics; Angel Records
1981	Gluck; Orfeo ed Euridice (Vienna Version 1762) (Amore)	Agnes Baltsa; Margaret Marshall	Riccardo Muti; Ambrosian Opera Chorus; Philharmonia Orchestra	His Master's Voice
1982	Mozart; Die Zauberflöte (Königin der Nacht)	Ileana Cotrubaș; Peter Schreier; Martti Talvela; Christian Boesch; Gudrun Sieber; Horst Hiestermann	James Levine; Konzertvereinigung Wiener Staatsopernchor, Wiener Philharmoniker; Filmed at the 1982 Salzburg Festival	TDK
1983	Donizetti; Lucia di Lammermoor (Lucia)	Alfredo Kraus; Kathleen Kuhlmann; Robert Lloyd (bass); Renato Bruson; Bruno Lazzaretti	Nicola Rescigno; Royal Philharmonic Orchestra, Ambrosian Singers	EMI Classics
1983	Mozart; Idomeneo (Elettra)	Luciano Pavarotti; Agnes Baltsa; Lucia Popp; Leo Nucci	John Pritchard; Wiener Philharmoniker, Konzertvereinigung Wiener Staatsopernchor	Decca Records
1984	Bellini; I Capuleti e i Montecchi (Giulietta)	Agnes Baltsa; Gwynne Howell; Dano Raffanti; John Tomlinson	Riccardo Muti; Chorus and Orchestra of the Royal Opera House; Recorded live over several performances May 1984	EMI Classics
1984	Verdi; Rigoletto (Gilda)	Renato Bruson; Neil Shicoff; Brigitte Fassbaender; Robert Lloyd	Giuseppe Sinopoli; Coro e Orchestra dell'Accademia Nazionale di Santa Cecilia	Philips Classics Records
1985	Mozart; Die Entführung aus dem Serail (Konstanze)	Kathleen Battle; Gösta Winbergh; Heinz Zednik; Martti Talvela	Georg Solti; Choir of Wiener Staatsoper, Wiener Philharmoniker	Decca Records
1988	Mozart; Die Zauberflöte (Königin der Nacht)	Barbara Bonney; Marjana Lipovšek; Peter Keller; Thomas Moser; Thomas Hampson; Matti Salminen; Hans Peter Blochwitz; Anton Scharinger	Nikolaus Harnoncourt; Choir and orchestra of Opernhaus Zürich	Teldec
1988	Strauss; Ariadne auf Naxos (Zerbinetta)	Jessye Norman; Júlia Várady; Paul Frey; Olaf Bär; Dietrich Fischer-Dieskau; Rudolf Amsus	Kurt Masur; Gewandhausorchester; Recorded at Neues Gewandhaus, Leipzig, January 1988	Philips Classics Records
1989	Donizetti; Maria Stuarda (Maria Stuarda)	Agnes Baltsa; Francisco Araiza; Francesco Ellero d'Artegna; Simone Alaimo; Iris Vermillion	Giuseppe Patanè; Münchner Rundfunkorchester; Choir of Bayerischer Rundfunk	Philips Classics Records
1989	Mozart; Lucio Silla (Giunia)	Cecilia Bartoli; Peter Schreier; Dawn Upshaw; Yvonne Kenny	Nikolaus Harnoncourt; Arnold Schoenberg Chor, Concentus Musicus Wien	Teldec
1989	Offenbach; Les contes d'Hoffmann (Olympia, Antonia, Giulietta)	Plácido Domingo; Claudia Eder; Gabriel Bacquier; James Morris; Justino Díaz	Seiji Ozawa; Chœurs de Radio France, Orchestre National de France	Deutsche Grammophon
1991	Donizetti; Lucia di Lammermoor (Lucia)	Neil Shicoff; Alexandru Agache; Alastair Miles; Bernard Lombardo; Francesco Piccoli	Richard Bonynge; Ambrosian Singers, London Symphony Orchestra; Recorded St Augustine's Church, London September 1991	Teldec
1992	Bellini; Beatrice di Tenda (Beatrice)	Vesselina Kasarova; Igor Morosow; Don Bernardini	Pinchas Steinberg; Wiener Jeunesse-Chor, ORF-Symphonieorchester; Live performance at the Wiener Konzerthaus 30/1 & 1/2 1992	Nightingale Classics
1992	Verdi; La traviata (Violetta)	Neil Shicoff; Giorgio Zancanaro	Carlo Rizzi; London Symphony Orchestra; Ambrosian Singers	Teldec
1992	Verdi; La traviata (Violetta)	Neil Shicoff; Giorgio Zancanaro	Carlo Rizzi; Filmed live at La Fenice, Venice, in December	Warner Music Vision DVD
1993	Humperdinck; Hänsel und Gretel (Gretel)	Ann Murray; Christa Ludwig; Gwyneth Jones; Franz Grundheber; Barbara Bonney; Christiane Oelze	Colin Davis; Staatskapelle Dresden; Children's choir of Staatsoper Dresden, Women of the Dresden Opera choir	Philips Classics Records
1993	Donizetti; Linda di Chamounix (Linda)	Dan Bernardini; Ettore Kim; Monica Groop; Stefano Palatchi; Anders Melander	Friedrich Haider; Swedish Radio Symphony Orchestra, Mikaeli Chamber Choir	Nightingale Classics
1994	Donizetti; Roberto Devereux (Elisabetta)	Delores Ziegler; Don Bernardini; Ettore Kim	Friedrich Haider; Chœurs de l'Opéra du Rhin, Orchestre Philharmonique de Strasbourg; Live recording	Nightingale Classics
1994	Donizetti; Anna Bolena (Anna Bolena)	Delores Ziegler; Stefano Palatchi; José Bros; Igor Morosow; Helene Schneiderman	Elio Boncompagni; Chorus and Orchestra of Hungarian Radio and Television; Recorded live Wiener Konzerthaus 28/11 & 1/12 1994	Nightingale Classics
1995	Donizetti; La fille du régiment (Marie)	Deon van der Walt; Rosa Laghezza; Philippe Fourcade; François Castel	Marcello Panni; Choir of Bayerischer Rundfunk, Münchner Rundfunkorchester; Recorded Herkulessaal of Münchner Residenz March 1995	Nightingale Classics
1997	Rossini; Il barbiere di Siviglia (Rosina)	Juan Diego Flórez; Rosa Laghezza; Vladmir Chernov; Enric Serra; Francesco Ellero d'Artegna	Ralf Weikert; Choir of Bayerischer Rundfunk, Münchner Rundfunkorchester; Live recording	Nightingale Classics
2004	Bellini; Norma (Norma)	Elīna Garanča; Aquiles Machado; Alastair Miles; Judith Howarth	Friedrich Haider; Vocal Ensemble Rastatt, Staatsphilharmonie Rheinland-Pfalz; Live recording	Nightingale Classics
2010	Donizetti; Lucrezia Borgia (Lucrezia Borgia)	José Bros; Silvia Tro Santafé; Franco Vassallo	Andriy Yurkevych; Chor of Oper Köln, WDR Rundfunkorchester Köln; Live recording at the Kölner Philharmonie	Nightingale Classics
