= Lamberto Gardelli =

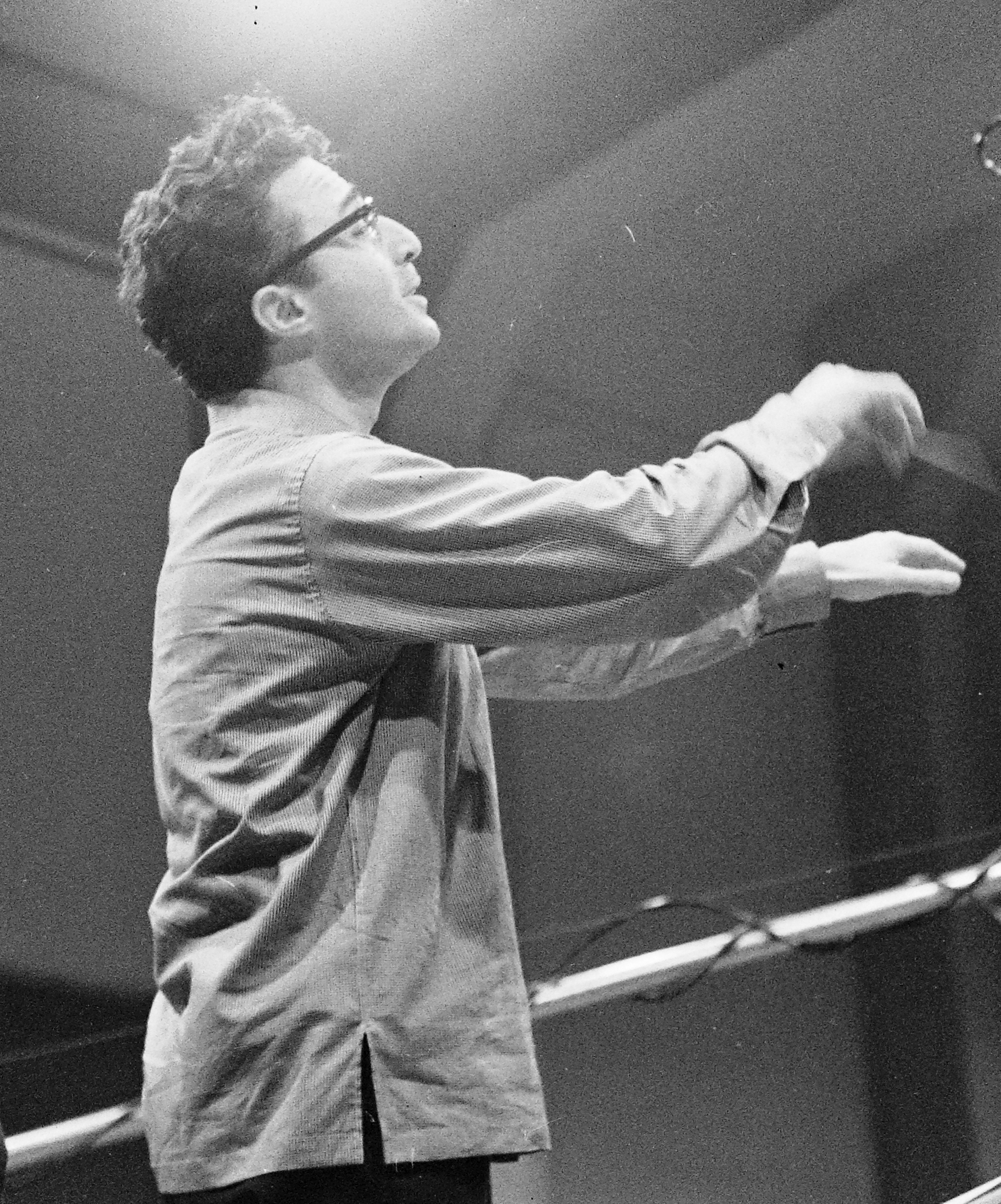
- Gardelli in 1962

Background information
- Born: 8 November 1915; Venice, Kingdom of Italy
- Died: 17 July 1998 (aged 82); Munich, Germany

Lamberto Gardelli (8 November 1915 – 17 July 1998) was an Italian naturalized Swedish conductor, particularly associated with the Italian opera repertory, especially the works of Giuseppe Verdi.

== Life and career ==
Born in Venice, Italy, Gardelli studied with Amilcare Zanella and Adriano Ariani at the Liceo Musicale Rossini in Pesaro, and later at the Accademia Nazionale di Santa Cecilia in Rome. He started his career as a pianist (appearing in public at the age of eight) and double-bass player in Italy. In addition to vocal studies he took composition classes with Goffredo Petrassi, and later spent eight years as an assistant to Serafin, also working with Mascagni during this period.

He made his conducting debut at the Rome Opera with La traviata in 1944. Professionally, he continued to have a major career in Europe in addition to making recordings of many neglected operas.

Gardelli was permanent guest conductor with the Royal Swedish Orchestra from 1946–1955, and conductor at the Royal Swedish Opera from 1947, working with singers such as Jussi Björling and Birgit Nilsson. He also conducted at the Drottningholm Theatre, and eventually adopted Swedish nationality and became a Court conductor. He was a conductor of the Danish Radio Orchestra from 1955–1961, then music director at the Hungarian State Opera from 1961 until 1966 and continued to appear in Budapest up until the 1990s. He made guest appearances at the Glyndebourne Festival from 1964 (with Macbeth, which was filmed), the Royal Opera House in London (during the period 1969–1982), the Metropolitan Opera in New York (debut 1966) and Deutsche Oper Berlin. He was chief Conductor of the Munich Radio Orchestra from 1982 to 1985 and of the Danish Radio Symphony Orchestra from 1986 until 1988.

Later in his career in Budapest he was noted for performances of Bruckner and Mahler symphonies. He "showed a firm command of a work's structure and used expressive nuance with discernment, eschewing any hint of excess".

He was made an "Officier de l'Ordre des Arts et des Lettres" in 1995, by the Ministère de la Culture (France).

He composed five operas, of which only L'impresario delle Americhe of 1959 was performed (Hungarian TV, 1982), while a post-Romantic Requiem was well received at performances in Budapest.

Gardelli died on 17 July 1998 in Munich, Germany, at the age of 82.

== Recordings ==
Gardelli was considered a specialist in the works of Verdi and he made several recordings of that composer's operas in the 1960s and 1970s, conducting pioneering recordings of the neglected early operas with record companies such as Philips and Orfeo. These included Alzira, Attila, Stiffelio, I masnadieri, Ernani, Oberto, Un giorno di regno, Il corsaro, as well as more well-known works such as Nabucco, Macbeth, La traviata, La forza del destino.

While not limiting himself to Verdi, he recorded the first complete French version of Rossini's Guillaume Tell and Giordano's Fedora with the rarely recorded Magda Olivero. He made studio recordings of four Respighi operas with Hungaroton. He was also mentor to several noted sopranos, including Lucia Aliberti and Sylvia Sass. His non-operatic recordings include orchestral works by G. Bizet, H.D. Koppel, F. Mendelssohn, I. Pizzetti and O. Respighi.

Some of his full opera recordings include:

- Cherubini: Medea – Dame Gwyneth Jones, Pilar Lorengar, Bruno Prevedi, Fiorenza Cossotto, Justino Díaz – Orchestra dell'Accademia Nazionale di Santa Cecilia (Decca Records, 1968)
- Verdi: Attila – Ruggero Raimondi, Cristina Deutekom, Sherrill Milnes, Carlo Bergonzi – The Ambrosian Singers, Royal Philharmonic Orchestra (Philips Records, 1973)
- Verdi: I Masnadieri – Carlo Bergonzi, Montserrat Caballé, Piero Cappuccilli, Ruggero Raimondi – The Ambrosian Singers, New Philharmonia Orchestra (Philips Records, 1975)
- Verdi: Nabucco – Tito Gobbi, Elena Souliotis, Dora Carral, Bruno Prevedi, Carlo Cava – Wiener Staatsopernchor, Orchester der Wiener Staatsoper (Decca Records, 1966)
- Verdi: Macbeth – Elena Souliotis, Dietrich Fischer-Dieskau, Nicolai Ghiaurov, Luciano Pavarotti – The Ambrosian Singers, London Philharmonic Orchestra (Decca Records, 1971)
- Verdi: La traviata – Mirella Freni, Franco Bonisolli, Sesto Bruscantini – Chor der Staatsoper Berlin, Staatskapelle Berlin (BASF Records, 1973)
- Verdi: La forza del destino – Martina Arroyo, Carlo Bergonzi, Piero Cappuccilli, Bianca Maria Casoni, Ruggero Raimondi, Geraint Evans – The Ambrosian Singers, Royal Philharmonic Orchestra (EMI, 1970)
- Ponchielli: La Gioconda – Renata Tebaldi, Carlo Bergonzi, Robert Merrill, Marilyn Horne, Nicola Ghiuselev, Oralia Dominguez – Coro e Orchestra dell'Accademia di Santa Cecilia (Decca Records, 1967)
- Puccini: Il tabarro – Renata Tebaldi, Mario del Monaco, Robert Merrill – Orchestra del Maggio Musicale Fiorentino (Decca Records, 1962)
- Puccini: Suor Angelica – Renata Tebaldi, Giulietta Simionato – Coro e Orchestra del Maggio Musicale Fiorentino (Decca Records, 1962)
- Puccini: Gianni Schicchi – Fernando Corena, Renata Tebaldi, Agostino Lazzari – Orchestra del Maggio Musicale Fiorentino (Decca Records, 1962)
- Rossini: Guillaume Tell – Gabriel Bacquier, Montserrat Caballé, Nicolai Gedda, Mady Mesplé, Kolos Kovátz, Gwynne Howell – The Ambrosian Singers, Royal Philharmonic Orchestra (EMI, 1973; original French version)

== Filmography ==
- Eldfågeln (1952) – Hasse Ekman's film starring Tito Gobbi (Gardelli appears as an accompanist and conductor)

== Sources ==
- Biography (in German)

Cultural offices
| Preceded by Heinz Wallberg | Chief Conductor, Münchner Rundfunkorchester; 1982–1985 | Succeeded by Giuseppe Patanè |
| Preceded by Herbert Blomstedt | Principal Conductor, Danish National Symphony Orchestra; 1986–1988 | Succeeded by Leif Segerstam |
