= Roberto Abbado =

Italian conductor (born 1954)

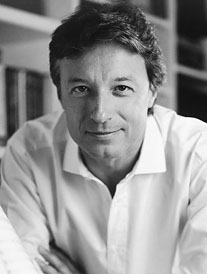
- Born: December 30, 1954 (age 71); Milan, Italy
- Occupation: Conductor
- Father: Marcello Abbado
- Relatives: Claudio Abbado (uncle)

Roberto Abbado (born 30 December 1954 in Milan) is an Italian opera and symphonic music conductor. Currently he is an Artistic Partner of The Saint Paul Chamber Orchestra. In 2015 he has been appointed music director of Palau de les Arts Reina Sofia in Valencia, Spain. From 2018 he's Music Director of the Festival Verdi in Parma. Previously he held the position of Chief Conductor of Münchner Rundfunkorchester (Munich Radio Orchestra).

== Childhood and education ==
Born into a musical family, Abbado is a son of the pianist and composer Marcello Abbado, for more than twenty years Director of Conservatorio di Musica "Giuseppe Verdi" in Milan. His grandfather was the violinist and teacher Michelangelo Abbado and his uncle the conductor Claudio Abbado. In his teens, Roberto studied at Conservatorio "G. Rossini" in Pesaro and then piano with Paolo Bordoni and composition with Bruno Bettinelli at Milan Conservatory. He studied conducting with Mario Gusella in Milan and Franco Ferrara at Teatro La Fenice in Venice and Accademia Nazionale di Santa Cecilia in Rome. He also attended the last summer course of Hans Swarowsky in Vienna in 1975.

== Career ==
In 1975, Piero Farulli funded the "Vincenzo Galilei" Orchestra and Chorus at Scuola Normale Superiore in Pisa to perform Bach Cantatas. Mario Gusella recommended Abbado to Piero Farulli in order to conduct the orchestra in a series of concerts.

In 1977, the musicians of Accademia di Santa Cecilia Symphony Orchestra asked Abbado to conduct a concert in Rieti, while he was still studying at Accademia, for a fellow student a privilege never to be. In the same year, he won the Second Prize at the Malko Competition for young conductors in Copenhagen, promoted by Danish Radio and Television.

In 1978, he conducted concerts with leading Italian and Scandinavian orchestras such as Orchestra del Teatro La Fenice, Orchestra Sinfonica della Rai di Milano, Helsingborg Symphony Orchestra, Aalborg Symphony Orchestra. His first appearance as an opera conductor, aged 23, was in Macerata, Arena Sferisterio in 1978, in a new production of Verdi's Simon Boccanegra, featuring Renato Bruson, Cesare Siepi and Ilva Ligabue. He conducted the season-opening night at Teatro La Fenice in December 1979 with a new production of Rossini's Il Turco in Italia.

In 1980, he conducted Verdi's Aida at Teatro Massimo in Palermo: one of the performance was attended by the Intendant of Wiener Staatsoper Seefelner, who immediately engaged Mr. Abbado.

In 1981, he conducted the world première of Flavio Testi's Il sosia at Piccola Scala in Milan. In the same year he conducted a new production of Rossini's La Cenerentola at Wiener Staatsoper, staged by Gian Carlo Menotti and featuring Agnes Baltsa, Francisco Araiza, Enzo Dara, and Giuseppe Taddei.

In 1982, he conducted Rossini's Il barbiere di Siviglia at Opernhaus in Zurich with Edita Gruberova and Araiza. In the summer he conducted at Edinburgh Festival Rossini's La pietra del paragone staged by Eduardo De Filippo with Orchestra and Chorus of Teatro alla Scala. In November he conducted Verdi's Don Carlo at Gran Teatre del Liceu in Barcelona with a stunning cast including Montserrat Caballé, Elena Obraztsova, José Carreras, Leo Nucci and Martti Talvela.

He made his debut at Teatro alla Scala in 1984 conducting Donizetti's Don Pasquale, in a production featuring Sesto Bruscantini in the title role and Lucia Aliberti. In the same house he also conducted the world première of Testi's Riccardo III in 1987, Ponchielli's La Gioconda in 1997, Donizetti's Lucia di Lammermoor in 2006, the world première of Fabio Vacchi's Teneke in 2007 and Rossini's La donna del lago with Joyce DiDonato, Daniela Barcellona and Juan Diego Flórez in 2011.

In 1985, he made his Paris debut with Orchestre National de France and Yo Yo Ma as soloist. He has conducted many leading orchestras in Europe, including Royal Concertgebouw Amsterdam, Orchestre de Paris, Filarmonica della Scala, Orchestra dell'Accademia di Santa Cecilia, Orchestra Sinfonica Nazionale della Rai, Orchestra del Maggio Musicale Fiorentino, Dresden Staatskapelle, Gewandhaus Orchester Leipzig, Israel Philharmonic Orchestra, NDR Symphony Orchestra (Hamburg), Rotterdam Philharmonic Orchestra, Vienna Symphony Orchestra, Swedish Radio Symphony Orchestra, Chamber Orchestra of Europe.

In 1987, he was appointed music director of the Municipal Theatre of Santiago in Chile, a position he held till 1989.

In 1989, he made his debut at Münchner Opernfestspiele of Bayerisches Staatsoper with Francesco Cilea's Adriana Lecouvreur with Mirella Freni and Plácido Domingo. He also conducted their new productions of La Traviata and Aida, furthermore Manon Lescaut, Don Pasquale, Carmen and Prokofiev's The Love for Three Oranges. From 1991 to 1998 he served as Chief Conductor of Münchner Rundfunkorchester (Munich Radio Orchestra).

In 1993, he toured in Japan with Teatro Comunale di Bologna.

In 1994, he made his debut at Metropolitan Opera in New York with Adriana Lecouvreur. He also conducted there Giordano's Fedora with Freni and Domingo (new production) in 1997, Verdi's La Traviata in 2000, Verdi's Ernani in 2008. In the USA he also conducted operas in San Francisco, Washington D.C., and Houston.

In 1995, he made his debut at Opéra Bastille with Lucia di Lammermoor featuring Mariella Devia. He conducted his Carnegie Hall debut in 1996 with The Orchestra of St. Luke's, further, he also conducted there the Philadelphia Orchestra and the Boston Symphony.

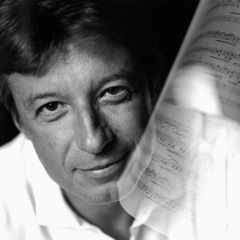
Roberto Abbado

In 1998 he conducted a new production of Verdi's I vespri siciliani at Wiener Staatsoper, staged by Herbert Wernicke. In the same year, he made his debut at Maggio Musicale Fiorentino conducting Rossini's Le comte Ory. He also conducted in Florence Verdi's Attila and I Lombardi alla prima crociata, Henze's Phaedra and Donizetti's Anna Bolena.

In 1998, he made a successful Boston Symphony Orchestra debut, opening his symphonic career in the USA. He also conducted many concerts with The Philadelphia Orchestra, Chicago Symphony Orchestra, San Francisco Symphony Orchestra, Cleveland Orchestra, New York Philharmonic Orchestra, Atlanta Symphony Orchestra, National Symphony Washington D.C., Los Angeles Philharmonic Orchestra, Minnesota Orchestra, Houston Symphony Orchestra, St. Louis Symphony Orchestra, Seattle Symphony Orchestra, Cincinnati Symphony Orchestra, Baltimore Symphony Orchestra, Pittsburgh Symphony Orchestra, Detroit Symphony Orchestra, Montreal Symphony Orchestra, Toronto Symphony Orchestra.

In 1999, he made his debut with The Saint Paul Chamber Orchestra. In 2005 he became Artistic Partner of the Orchestra, the longest position in an artistic team ranking Jeremy Denk, Patricia Kopatchinskaja, Edo de Waart, Christian Zacharias and Thomas Zehetmeir.

In 2003, he conducted a new production of Verdi's Simon Boccanegra at Teatro Regio (Turin), staged by Graham Vick. He worked again with the English stage director in Turin for Mozart's La clemenza di Tito in 2008, and at Rossini Opera Festival in Pesaro for Mosè in Egitto in 2011. He also conducted for the same Festival Ermione in 2008 and Zelmira in 2009.

In 2008, he conducted the season-opening night at Teatro Comunale in Bologna with Marschner's Der Vampyr, staged by Pier Luigi Pizzi. He also conducted the season-opening night in 2013 with Verdi's MacBeth staged by Bob Wilson and in 2014 with Wagner's Parsifal staged by Romeo Castellucci.

In 2012, he conducted a new production of Berlioz's La damnation de Faust staged by Terry Gilliam at Teatro Massimo in Palermo.

In 2013, he took the Neapolitan Teatro di San Carlo on tour to Hong Kong with La Traviata staged by Ferzan Ozpetek.

In 2014, he made his Salzburg Festival debut with Donizetti's La favorite with Elina Garanča, Juan Diego Florez and Ludovic Tezier.

In 2015, after his debut with Don Pasquale, he was appointed music director of Palau de les Arts Reina Sofia in Valencia, Spain. Also in 2015, he conducted Donizetti's Lucia di Lammermoor staged by Luca Ronconi at Teatro dell'Opera di Roma with Jessica Pratt and Stefano Secco. At same house he previously conducted Rossini's Maometto II staged by Pier Luigi Pizzi in 2014, Ponchielli's La Gioconda in 2012, Verdi's Luisa Miller in 1990 and the world premiere of Ferrero's Charlotte Corday in 1989.

He also premiered many new orchestral works of leading composers, including Claudio Ambrosini, Giorgio Battistelli, Niccolò Castiglioni, Aldo Clementi, Azio Corghi, Michele dall'Ongaro, Luca Francesconi, Ned Rorem, Steven Stucky, Giampaolo Testoni, Fabio Vacchi, Charles Wuorinen, and new operas by Lorenzo Ferrero and Marco Tutino.

More recently he was on the podium of the Opera di Roma with Benvenuto Cellini and Andrea Chénier, of the Palau de les Arts in Valencia with A Midsummer Night's Dream, I vespri siciliani and Tancredi, of the Teatro Real in Madrid with Norma, of the Shanghai Opera House with La traviata, of the Rossini Opera Festival with Le Siège de Corinthe and of the Théâtre des Champs Elysées with Lucia di Lammermoor.

From 2015 Abbado has led the orchestras of San Francisco, Dallas, Atlanta and Minnesota, the New World Symphony, the MDR-Sinfonieorchester of Leipzig, the Saint Paul Chamber Orchestra, the Malaysian Philharmonic and the Orquestra Sinfónica de Madrid.

== Prizes and awards ==
In 2009 Roberto Abbado was appointed Conductor of the Year – "Franco Abbiati" Award by Associazione Nazionale dei Critici musicali, an Italian top classical music award. In 2012, he won the "Franco Abbiati" Award - Best performance and production for Rossini Opera Festival Mosè in Egitto.

== CDs ==
- Verdi: Macbeth – Roberto Abbado/ Coro del Teatro Regio di Parma & Filarmonica Arturo Toscanini/ Parco Ducale di Parma, Italy, Festival Verdi 2020, Sept 2020 Dynamic CDS7915.02 DDD
- Verdi: Le trouvère – Roberto Abbado/ Orchestra e Coro del Teatro Comunale di Bologna / Gipali/ Gipali/ Vassallo, Oct. 2018 Dynamic.
- Verismo Arias – Roberto Abbado/ Orchestra del Teatro La Fenice / Mirella Freni, 1992
- Puccini: Turandot – Roberto Abbado/Münchner Rundfunkorchester/Eva Marton/Ben Heppner/Margaret Price, 1993 Sony/RCA
- Donizetti: Don Pasquale – Roberto Abbado/Münchner Rundfunkorchester/Renato Bruson/Eva Mei/Frank Lopardo/Thomas Allen, 1994 Sony/RCA
- Rossini: Tancredi – Roberto Abbado/Münchner Rundfunkorchester/Vesselina Kasarova/Eva Mei/Ramón Vargas/Veronica Cangemi, 1996 Sony/RCA. Echo der Klassik 1997.
- Bellini: I Capuleti e i Montecchi – Roberto Abbado/Münchner Rundfunkorchester/Vesselina Kasarova/Eva Mei/Ramón Vargas/Umberto Chiummo/Simone Alberghini, 1998 Sony/RCA. Pick of the Year 1999, BBC Music Magazine.
- Luca Francesconi: Cobalt Scarlet – Rest - Orchestra Sinfonica Nazionale della RAI/Anssi Karttunen/Roberto Abbado, 2005 Stradivarius
- Florez, Arias for Rubini (Rossini/Bellini/Donizetti) – Roberto Abbado/S. Cecilia, 2007 Decca
- Garanca, Bel Canto – Elīna Garanča/Filarmonica del Teatro Comunale di Bologna/Roberto Abbado, 2009 Deutsche Grammophon. Echo der Klassik 2010.
- Flórez, L'amour – Roberto Abbado/Orch. Bologna, 2013 Decca. Diapason d'Or 2014.
- Garanca, Revive (Arie da opere) – Roberto Abbado/Orch. Valencia, 2016 Deutsche Grammophon
- Brahms: Hungarian Dances Nos. 1-21 – Roberto Abbado / Munich Radio Orchestra, studio recording 1996/1997, BR-KLASSIK 900360, 2025

== DVDs and Blu-ray ==
- Giordano, Fedora – Abbado Roberto/Freni/Domingo, 1997 Deutsche Grammophon
- New Year's Concert 2008 – Roberto Abbado/ Orch. e Coro del Teatro La Fenice/Frittoli/Fraccaro/Furlanetto/Ezralow, 2008 Hardy Classic Video
- Rossini, Zelmira – Roberto Abbado/Florez/Aldrich/Kunde, 2009 Decca
- Rossini, Ermione – Roberto Abbado/Ganassi/Kunde, 2009 Dynamic
- Rossini, Mosé in Egitto – Roberto Abbado/Ganassi/Zanellato/Korchak, 2012 Opus Arte

== Notes ==
Cultural offices
Preceded by Giuseppe Patanè	Chief Conductor, Münchner Rundfunkorchester; 1991–1998	Succeeded by Marcello Viotti
