= Luigi Scevola =

Luigi Scevola (born Brescia, 1770 – died Milan, 7 August 1819) was an Italian dramatist.

He was born in Brescia, and became a professor of rhetoric there. After the French conquest of the Veneto, he became Secretary of Education (istruzione pubblica). In that position, he defended some of the libraries of the religious institutions from confiscation, including the Biblioteca Queriniana. With the fall of Napoleon in 1815, he lost his position and withdrew to Milan. He is described as a follower of the style of Vittorio Alfieri (Astigiano?), while other note he wrote in the style of Ugo Foscolo.

Scevola was the author of the tragedies La Morte di Socrate (Death of Socrates) in 1804; Annibale in Bitinia (Hannibal in Bythnia) in 1806; Aristodemo; Erode; and Saffo (Sappho) in 1814. One of his plays was the basis of the libretti for Giulietta e Romeo (Romeo and Juliet) by Nicola Vaccai and I Capuleti e i Montecchi by Vincenzo Bellini.
