= Nicola Monti =

Italian opera singer (1920–1993)

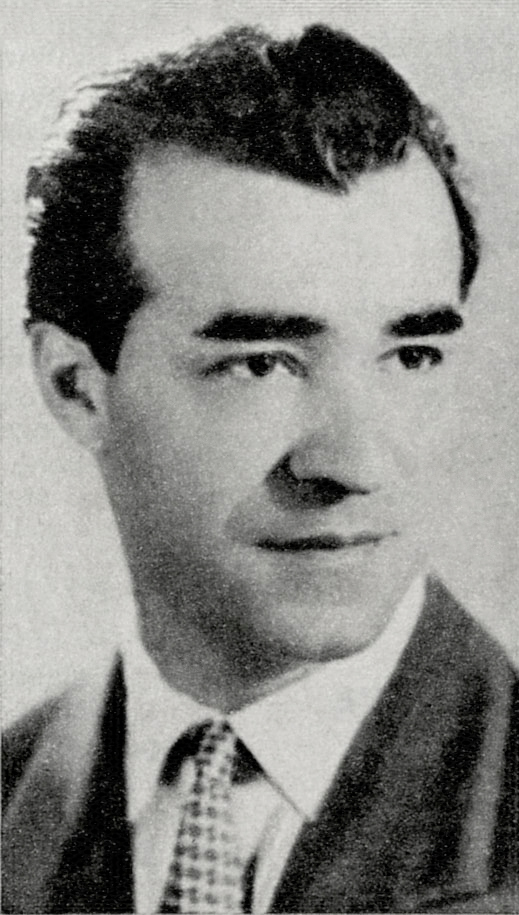
- Born: 21 November 1920
- Died: 1 March 1993 (aged 72)
- Occupation: Italian opera singer

Nicola Monti (21 November 1920 – 1 March 1993) was an Italian opera singer, one of the leading tenori di grazia of the 1950s.

Born in Milan, Italy, Monti studied voice from an early age, and made his debut in concert in Florence in 1941, and that same year sang his first major role, the Duke of Mantua, in Cagliari. His career was interrupted by the war, but he resumed his studies in 1950 by entering the "Scuola di Canta" of the Teatro alla Scala. In 1951, he made his official operatic debut at the Teatro San Carlo in Naples as Elvino in La sonnambula, a role he will remain closely associated with throughout his career.

Nicola Monti in L'elisir d'amore, Teatro alla Scala, 1950-1951.

He sang widely in Italy, appearing in Le comte Ory at the Maggio Musicale Fiorentino in Florence in 1952. In 1954, he appeared in an Italian television production of Il barbiere di Siviglia, opposite Rolando Panerai and Antonietta Pastori.

His career quickly took an international turn. He appeared as Elvino at the Wexford Festival in 1952, returning the following year as Nemorino in L'elisir d'amore. He also made guest appearances in Paris, Brussels, Amsterdam, and made his debut as Elvino opposite Anna Moffo at the San Francisco Opera in 1960.

A stylish singer, Monti had a light and attractive voice, and can be heard on a number of recordings. He recorded both Paisiello's and Rossini's Barbiere di Siviglia, La cambiale di matrimonio, Il re pastore, L'elisir d'amore, but is probably best remembered for his two recordings of La sonnambula, opposite Maria Callas in 1957 and Joan Sutherland in 1962.
