= I Capuleti e i Montecchi =

1830 opera by Vincenzo Bellini

- Opera by Vincenzo Bellini
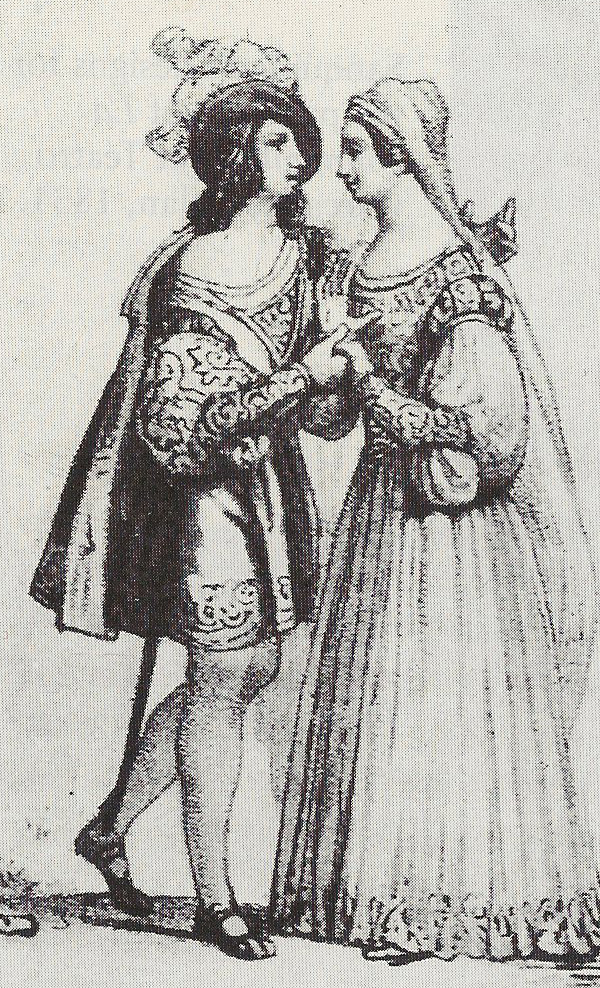
- Giuditta Grisi (left) and Amalia Schütz at La Scala, December 1830
- Librettist: Felice Romani
- Language: Italian
- Based on: Luigi Scevola's play Giulietta e Romeo
- Premiere: 11 March 1830; Teatro La Fenice, Venice

I Capuleti e i Montecchi (The Capulets and the Montagues) is an Italian opera (tragedia lirica) in two acts by Vincenzo Bellini. The libretto by Felice Romani was a reworking of the story of Romeo and Juliet for an opera by Nicola Vaccai called Giulietta e Romeo and based on the play of the same name by Luigi Scevola written in 1818, thus an Italian source rather than taken directly from Shakespeare's play.

Bellini was persuaded to write the opera for the 1830 Carnival season at the Teatro La Fenice in Venice, with only a month and a half available for composition. He succeeded by appropriating a large amount of music previously written for his unsuccessful opera Zaira.

The first performance of I Capuleti e i Montecchi took place on 11 March 1830.

== Composition history ==
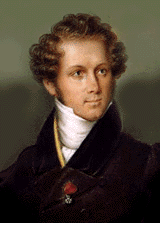
Bellini in about 1830

Mezzo-soprano Giuditta Grisi sang Romeo

=== After Zaira ===
Following the poor reception which Zaira received in Parma, Bellini returned to Milan by the end of June 1829 with no contract for another opera in sight. Giovanni Pacini, a Catanian composer like Bellini, was still in Milan after the well-received premiere of his Il Talismano, and he received offers to compose an opera for both Turin and Venice for the following Carnival season. He accepted both offers, but the La Fenice impresario, Alessandro Lanari, included a proviso that if he were to be unable to fulfill the Venice contract, then it would be transferred to Bellini.

A firm offer of a contract for a new opera for Venice appeared in the autumn, a contract which also included a provision that Il pirata would also be given during the 1830 Carnival season. By mid-December Bellini was in Venice where he heard the same singers who were to perform in Pirata: they were Giuditta Grisi, the tenor Lorenzo Bonfigli, and Giulio Pellegrini.

=== Bellini in Venice ===
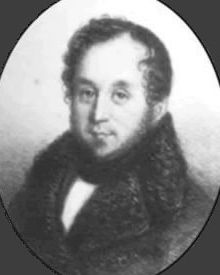
Venice impresario Alessandro Lanari

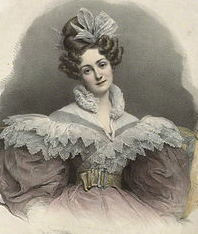
Soprano Rosalbina Caradori-Allan sang Giulietta

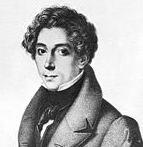
Composer Giovanni Pacini

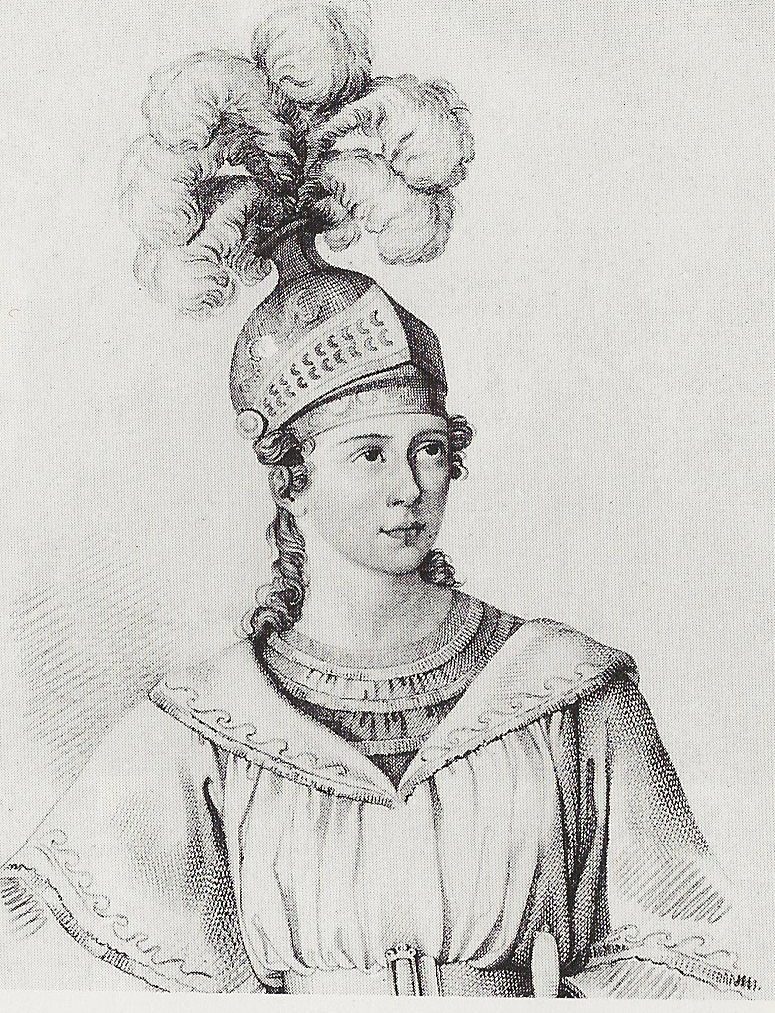
Maria Malibran as Romeo, Bologna, 1832

With rehearsals for Pirata underway in late December, Bellini was given notice by Lanari that it was doubtful whether Pacini would be present in time to stage an opera and that a contract was to be prepared for Bellini to provide a new opera but with the proviso that it would only become effective on 14 January. Accepting the offer on 5 January, Bellini stated that he would set Romani's libretto for Giulietta Capellio, that he required 45 days between receipt of the libretto and the first performance, and that he would accept 325 napoleoni d'oro (about 8,000 lire).

The tentative contract deadline was extended until 20 January, but by that date Romani was in Venice, having already re-worked much of his earlier libretto which he had written for Nicola Vaccai's 1825 opera, Giulietta e Romeo, the source for which was the play of the same name by Luigi Scevola in 1818. The two men set to work, but with the winter weather in Venice becoming increasingly bad, Bellini fell ill; however, he had to continue to work under great pressure within a now-limited timetable. Eventually, revisions to Romani's libretto were agreed to, a new title was given to the work, and Bellini reviewed his score of Zaira to see how some of the music could be set to the new text, but composing the part of Romeo for Grisi. He also took Giulietta's "Oh quante volte" and Nelly's romanza from Adelson e Salvini. The Giulietta was to be sung by Rosalbina Caradori-Allan.

== Performance history ==
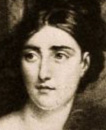
Giuditta Pasta, Romeo in 1833

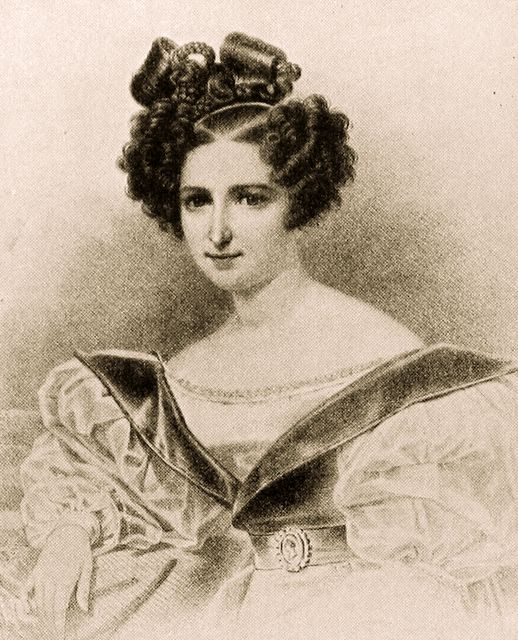
Wilhelmine Schröder-Devrient, Romeo in 1834 and 1835

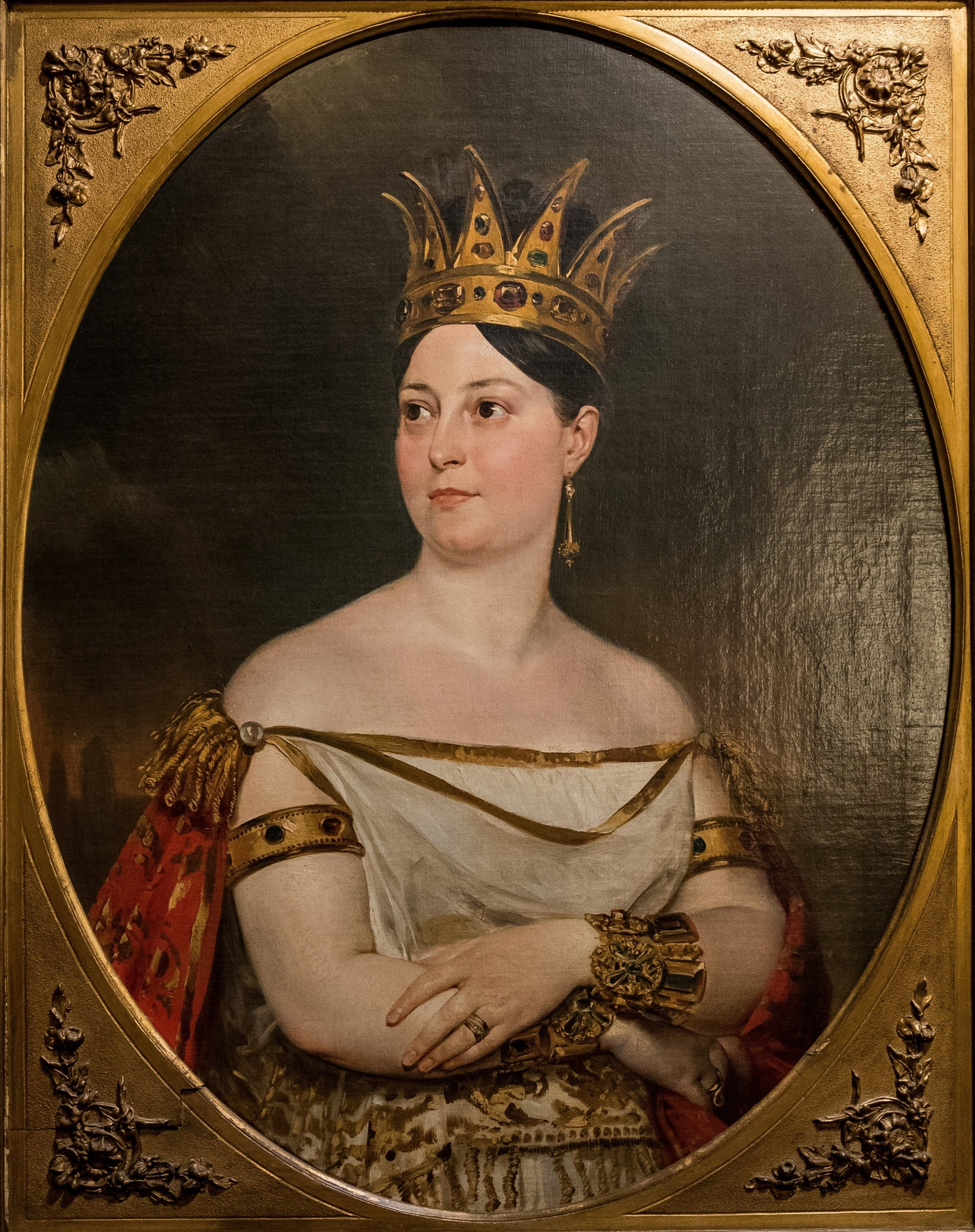
Giuseppina Ronzi de Begnis, restored Bellini's ending, 1834

=== 19th century ===
At the premiere of I Capuleti e i Montecchi on 11 March 1830 success for Bellini returned. Weinstock describes the premiere as "an unclouded and immediate success" but it was only able to be performed eight times before the La Fenice season closed on 21 March. A local newspaper, I Teatri, reported that "all things considered, this opera by Bellini has aroused as much enthusiasm in Venice as La straniera aroused in Milan from the first evening on".

By this time, Bellini knew that he had achieved fame: writing on 28 March, he stated that: "My style is now heard in the most important theatres in the world...and with the greatest enthusiasm." Before leaving Venice, Bellini was offered a contract to produce another new opera for La Fenice for the 1830–31 Carnival season, and—upon his return to Milan—he also found an offer from Genoa for a new opera but proposed for the same time period, an offer he was forced to reject.

Later that year, Bellini prepared a version of Capuleti for La Scala which was given on 26 December, lowering Giulietta's part for the mezzo-soprano Amalia Schütz Oldosi.

Very quickly after the premiere, performances began to be given all over Italy in about thirty different productions up to 1835. It continued to be seen fairly regularly until the end of the 1860s. Details of European productions, which were numerous and which began in Dresden on 1 October 1831, continued into the 1840s. The opera was first staged in the UK on 20 July 1833 and in the US on 4 April 1837 at the St Charles Theatre in New Orleans; later, first US performances were given in Boston on 13 May 1847 and in New York on 28 January 1848.

In 1859 a French version, translated by Charles Nuitter, premiered in Paris Opera. It was prepared specially for the singer Felicita von Vestvali, who sang Romeo. The audience celebrated her performances enthusiastically and the critics compared Vestvali to Maria Malibran, Wilhelmine Schröder-Devrient and Rachel Félix. Napoleon III was so captivated with her that he presented her with a solid silver suit of armor for her performance.

=== 20th century ===
The opera was unheard in the 20th century until a concert performance was recorded for an RAI radio broadcast in 1957 with Antonietta Pastori as Giulietta, Fiorenza Cossotto as Romeo, and Lorin Maazel leading the music forces. The first United States performance during the 20th century was presented by the American Opera Society (AOS) in a concert version at Carnegie Hall in 1958 with Giulietta Simionato as Romeo, Laurel Hurley as Giulietta, Richard Cassilly as Tebaldo, Ezio Flagello as Cappellio, and conductor Arnold Gamson. It was the first time the opera had been performed in New York City in one hundred years, and was recorded on disc. The AOS presented the opera in concert again at Carnegie Hall in 1964 with Mary Costa as Giulietta and Simionato reprising the role of Romeo; a performance which was also recorded.

La Scala staged the opera in 1967 using new designs by Emanuele Luzzati and musical forces led by Claudio Abbado. This staging reworked the part of Romeo for the tenor voice, with Giacomo Aragall taking on the role. Aragall had sung this reworked version earlier under Abbado's baton at the Teatro Comunale di Bologna and the Holland Festival in 1966 with Margherita Rinaldi as Giulietta. The La Scala production toured to Expo 67 in Montreal, and its cast included Renata Scotto as Giulietta, Luciano Pavarotti as Tybalt, Agostino Ferrin as Capulet, and Alfredo Giacomotti as Lawrence. Aragall and Scotto reprised their roles in this version of the opera with the Philadelphia Lyric Opera Company at the Academy of Music in 1968. Tenor Renzo Casellato portrayed Romeo at the Teatro Colón in 1971, and tenor Veriano Luchetti sang Romeo in La Fenice's 1973 staging.

In 1975 conductor Sarah Caldwell and the Opera Company of Boston mounted the opera with Tatiana Troyanos as Romeo and Beverly Sills as Giulietta. Sills also performed that role the same year in a London concert with the Philharmonia Orchestra with Janet Baker as Romeo. Troyanos reprised the part of Romeo in 1985 for the Lyric Opera of Chicago's first staging of the opera with Cecilia Gasdia as Giulietta.

In 1977 the Dallas Opera staged the work with Marilyn Horne as Romeo and Linda Zoghby as Giulietta. That same year the Vienna State Opera presented the work for the first time with Sona Ghazarian as Giulietta and Agnes Baltsa as Romeo. Baltsa portrayed Romeo again in multiple productions; including the opera's first staging at The Royal Opera of London (1984, with Edita Gruberová as Giulietta) and the Liceu (1985, with Alida Ferrarini as Giulietta), and in the 1987 La Scala production with June Anderson as Giulietta.

The opera had stagings at several opera houses in the 1990s, including La Fenice (1991), Teatro di San Carlo (1995), the Semperoper (1998), and the Scottish Opera (1998). In 1999 conductor Eve Queler and the Opera Orchestra of New York presented the opera in concert at Avery Fisher Hall with Vesselina Kasarova as Romeo and Annick Massis as Giulietta.

=== 21st century ===
Modern day productions have been mounted fairly frequently, with 102 performances of 27 productions given in 24 cities since 1 January 2011 and forward into 2015. A San Francisco Opera production opened on 29 September 2012 featuring Nicole Cabell and Joyce DiDonato as the lovers, and both singers were part of a Lyric Opera of Kansas City production in September 2013.

On 28 September 2014, Washington Concert Opera presented a concert performance of the work with Kate Lindsey as Romeo, Nicole Cabell as Giulietta, and David Portillo as Tebaldo. The opera was also staged at the Teatro Massimo Bellini in Catania in October 2014. In 2019, I Capuleti e i Montecchi was performed at the Grimeborn Festival, Arcola Theatre, London.

== Roles ==
Roles, voice types, premiere cast
Role	Voice type	Premiere cast, 11 March 1830
Romeo, leader of the Montecchi	mezzo-soprano (en travesti)	Giuditta Grisi
Giulietta, in love with Romeo	soprano	Maria Caradori-Allan
Tebaldo, betrothed to Giulietta	tenor	Lorenzo Bonfigli
Lorenzo, doctor and retainer of the Capuleti	bass	Ranieri Pocchini
Capellio, leader of the Capuleti, father of Giulietta	bass	Gaetano Antoldi

== Synopsis ==
In this version of the story the Capuleti and Montecchi are rival political factions (Guelph and Ghibelline respectively) rather than Shakespeare's "two households, both alike in dignity". Capellio is the father of Giulietta (Juliet) and the leader of the Capuleti. Giulietta is betrothed to Tebaldo (Tybalt), however she has already met and fallen in love with Romeo, leader of the Montecchi (Montagues). This is a secret to all but Lorenzo (Lawrence), her doctor and confidant. Complicating matters, Romeo has inadvertently killed the son of Capellio (Giulietta's brother) in battle.

Place: around the palace of Capellio (Capulet) in Verona
Time: 13th century

Sinfonia

=== Act 1 ===
Scene 1: The Palace

Capellio and Tebaldo address their followers advising rejection of an offer of peace to be brought by an envoy from Romeo, the man who had killed Capellio's son. Tebaldo states that he will avenge the killing to celebrate his marriage to Giulietta: (Cavatina: È serbata a questo acciaro / "And reserved for this sword / is the vengeance of your blood") and he urges Capellio to hasten the moment when he may marry Giulietta and then avenge Capellio. The doctor, Lorenzo, objects that Giulietta is ill with a fever, but Capellio brushes his warning aside and declares the wedding will take place immediately. Tebaldo proclaims his love for Giulietta: Sì: M'Abbraccia / "I love her so much / She is so dear to me". Capellio's men urge him on and arrangements are made to have the wedding take place that day.

While the men proclaim their hatred of the Montecchi, Romeo enters in the guise of a Montecchi envoy, offering peace to be guaranteed by the marriage of Romeo and Giulietta. He explains that Romeo regrets the death of Capellio's son (Cavatina: Ascolta: Se Romeo t'uccise un figlio / "Listen: If Romeo killed your son / he brought him death in battle / And you must blame fate"), and offers to take his place as a second son for the old man. Capellio indicates that Tebaldo has already taken on that role and—together with all his men—rejects all idea of peace: "War! War", the men proclaim. Romeo accepts their challenge of war: (Cabaletta: La tremenda ultrice spada/ "Romeo will prepare to brandish the dread avenging sword / Romeo accepts your challenge of war.)

Scene 2: Giulietta's room

Giulietta enters proclaiming her frustration against all the wedding preparations which she sees about her. Recitative: "I burn, a fire consumes me wholly. In vain do I seek solace from the winds... Where are you Romeo?". Cavatina: Oh! quante volte / "Oh how many times do I weep and beg heaven for you".

Lorenzo enters, explaining that he has arranged for Romeo to come to her by a secret door. When Romeo enters, he tries to persuade Giulietta to escape with him. Duetto: Romeo: Sì, fuggire: a noi non resta / "Yes, flee, for us there is no other escape"; he demands: "What power is greater for you than love?", but she resists in the name of duty, law, and honour, declaring that she would prefer to die of a broken heart. Romeo is distraught: Cantabile: Romeo: Ah crudel, d'onor ragioni / "Oh cruel one, you speak of honour when you were stolen from me?" Giulietta responds "Ah what more you ask of me?", then, in a tempo di mezzo in which each expresses his/her conflicting emotions, the situation becomes more and more impossible for them both.

The sounds of wedding preparations are heard: Giulietta urges Romeo to flee; he declares that he will stay and, in a final cabaletta in which Romeo pleads "Come, ah Come! Rely on me", Giulietta continues to resist. Each leaves.

Scene 3: Another part of the palace

The Capuleti are celebrating the forthcoming marriage. All those assembled join in. Romeo enters in disguise and tells Lorenzo, who immediately recognises him, that he is awaiting the support of his soldiers, one thousand of whom are assembled dressed as Ghibelines and who are intent on preventing the wedding. Lorenzo remonstrates with him, but suddenly, the armed attack by the Montecchi takes place as they surge into the palace, Romeo with them.

Giulietta is alone, lamenting the state of affairs, Tace il fragor / "The tumult has ended". Then she sees Romeo, who has appeared, and again he urges her to run away with him: "I ask this in the name of promised love", he declares. Capellio, Tebaldo and the Ghibelines discover them, and believe that Romeo is still the Montecchi envoy. As Giulietta tries to shield him from her father, Romeo proudly tells them his true name. The Montecchi enter to protect him and, in a concerted finale involving all from both factions, the lovers are separated by their family members, finally proclaiming: Al furor che si ridesta / "If all hope of ever seeing each other again in life / this will not be the last farewell". Capellio, Tebaldo, and Lorenzo become part of the quintet finale, as the ranks of the supporters of both sides join in the swell.

=== Act 2 ===
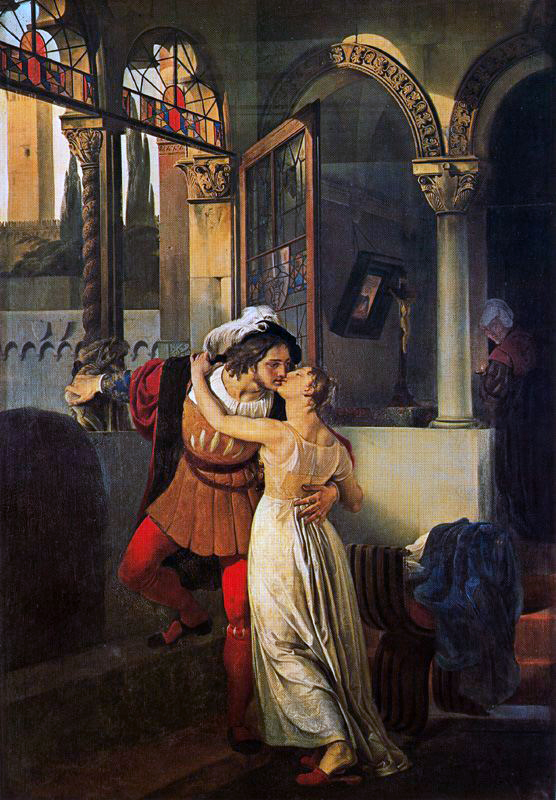
The Last Kiss of Romeo and Juliet by Francesco Hayez, 1823

Scene 1: Another part of the Palace

Introduced by a solo for cello, Giulietta awaits news of the fighting. Lorenzo enters and immediately tells her that Romeo lives, but she will soon be taken away to Tebaldo's castle. He offers a solution: that she must take a sleeping potion which will make it appear that she has died. She will then be taken to her family's tomb where he will arrange for Romeo and himself to be present when she awakes. In a state of indecision, she contemplates her options. (Aria: Morte io non temo, il sai / "You know that I do not fear death, / I have always asked death of you...") and she expresses doubts while Lorenzo urges her to take the potion, given that her father is about to come into the room. Taking the bottle, she declares that "only death can wrest me from my cruel father".

With his followers, Capellio comes to order her to leave with Tebaldo at dawn. Her ladies beg her father to be kinder towards her. Proclaiming that she is close to death, she begs her father's forgiveness: Cabaletta: Ah! non poss'io partire / "Ah, I cannot leave without your forgiveness.....Let your anger turn just once to peace", but Capellio rejects her and orders her to her room. He then instructs his men to keep watch on Lorenzo of whom he is suspicious; they are ordered not to allow Lorenzo to have contact with anyone.

Scene 2: The grounds of the palace

An orchestral introduction precedes Romeo's entrance and introduces what Weinstock describes as "his bitter recitative", Deserto è il loco / "This place is abandoned", in which he laments Lorenzo's apparent forgetfulness in failing to meet him as planned. He then hears the noise of someone entering. It is Tebaldo, and the two men begin an angry duet (Tebaldo: Stolto! a un sol mio grido / "With one cry a thousand men will arrive". Romeo: "I scorn you. You will wish the alps and the sea stood between us"). As they are about to begin fighting, the sound of a funeral procession is heard (Pace alla tua bell'anima). They stop and listen, only then realising that it is a procession for Giulietta. In a cabaletta finale, the rivals are united in remorse, asking each other for death as they continue to fight.

Scene 3: The tombs of the Capuleti

Along with his Montecchi followers, Romeo enters the tomb of the Capuleti. The followers mourn Giulietta's death. At her tomb and in order to bid her farewell, Romeo asks for it to be opened. He also asks that the Montecchi leave him alone with Giulietta: Romanza: Deh! tu, bell'anima / "Alas! You, fair soul / Rising up to heaven / turn to me, bear me with you". Realising his only course of action will be death, he swallows poison and, lying down beside her, he hears a sigh, then the sound of her voice. Giulietta wakes up to find that Romeo knew nothing of her simulated death and had been unaware of Lorenzo's plan. Urging him to leave with her, Giulietta gets up but Romeo states that he must remain there forever, explaining that he has already acted to end his life. In a final cabaletta, the couple clings to each other. Then he dies and Giulietta, unable to live on without him, falls dead onto his body. The Capuleti and Montecchi rush in to discover the dead lovers, with Capellio demanding who is responsible: "You, ruthless man", they all proclaim.

== Music ==
Musical borrowings

Musicologist Mary Ann Smart has examined the issue of Bellini's "borrowings" and she notes: "Bellini's famously scrupulous attitude to the matching of music and poetry did not prevent him from borrowing from himself almost as frequently as did the notoriously economical Handel and Rossini." Specifically, in regard to I Capuleti, she continues:

Bellini lost no time in rescuing much of [Zaira's] material, reusing no fewer than eight numbers in his next opera. The music that had failed so completely in Parma was acclaimed in Venice in its new guise, probably more because the Venice audience was inherently better disposed to Bellini's style than because of any aesthetic improvement. But if we can take Bellini at his word, the extensive self-borrowing involved in recasting Zaira as I Capuleti was no lazy response to a looming deadline: although he was indeed forced to compose faster than he liked, he remarked repeatedly on how hard he was working, on one occasion complaining that the act 1 finale of Capuleti—one of the numbers copied almost literally from Zaira had nearly "driven him crazy." The sheer volume of common material in these two operas ensures that dramatic resemblance between the recycled melodies in I Capuleti and their original incarnations in Zaira will be the exception rather than the rule.

Smart then provides one specific example whereby word metering (the number of syllables for each line, traditionally written in a specific meter by the poet—the librettist—of from five to eight or more to each line of verse) is changed to work in the new context:

What are we to make of Bellini's decision to bring back the cabaletta for the prima donna soprano in Zaira, a number whose prevailing sentiment is giddy anticipation of an imminent wedding, as Romeo's lamenting slow movement in the last act of I Capuleti, sung over Juliet's inanimate body? Not only is one of Bellini's most frivolous soprano cabalettas pressed into service as a monologue confronting death, but the number is transferred from the female to the male lead (although both roles are sung by female voices, since the role of Romeo is written for a mezzo-soprano). And as if to emphasize the violence of the transformation, the poetic texts are in different verse meters—Zaira's cabaletta in settenari, Romeo's in the less common quinari The means by which Bellini and Romani stretched Romeo's quinari lines to fit a melody originally conceived for settenari is ingenious, achieved simply by inserting word repetitions between the second and third syllables of each line.

== Recordings ==
Year	Cast (Romeo, Giulietta, Tebaldo, Capellio, Lorenzo)	Conductor, opera house and orchestra	Label
1958	Fiorenza Cossotto, Antonietta Pastori, Renato Gavarini, Vittorio Tatozzi, Ivo Vinco	Lorin Maazel, RAI Orchestra and Chorus, Rome (Recording of a performance broadcast on 23 October)	CD: Myto; Cat: 00166
1966	Giacomo Aragall, Margherita Rinaldi, Luciano Pavarotti, Nicola Zaccaria, Walter Monachesi	Claudio Abbado, Den Haag Orchestra and Teatro Comunale di Bologna Chorus, Den Haag	CD: Opera Magic's; Cat: OM24162
1968	Giacomo Aragall, Renata Scotto, Luciano Pavarotti, Agostino Ferrin, Alfredo Giacomotti	Claudio Abbado, Teatro alla Scala Orchestra and Chorus, Milano (Recording of a performance broadcast on 8 January)	CD: Opera Depot; Cat: 11160-2
1975	Janet Baker, Beverly Sills, Nicolai Gedda, Robert Lloyd, Raimund Herincx	Giuseppe Patanè, New Philharmonia Orchestra and the John Alldis Choir	CD: EMI; Cat: 5 86055-2
1984	Agnes Baltsa, Edita Gruberová, Dano Raffanti, Gwynne Howell, John Tomlinson	Riccardo Muti, Royal Opera House, Covent Garden Orchestra and Chorus	CD: EMI; Cat: 5 09144
1997	Vesselina Kasarova, Eva Mei, Ramón Vargas, Umberto Chiummo, Simone Alberghini	Roberto Abbado, Munich Radio Orchestra and Chorus	CD: RCA Victor; Cat: 09026 68899-2
1998	Jennifer Larmore, Hei-Kyung Hong, Paul Groves, Raymond Aceto, Robert Lloyd	Donald Runnicles, Scottish Chamber Orchestra and Chorus	CD: Teldec; Cat: 3984-21472-2
2005	Clara Polito, Patrizia Ciofi, Danilo Formaggio, Federico Sacchi, Nicolo Amodio	Luciano Acocella, Orchestra Internazionale d'Italia	CD: Dynamic; CDS 504/1-2; DVD: Dynamic; 33504
2008	Elīna Garanča, Anna Netrebko, Joseph Calleja, Tiziano Bracci, Robert Gleadow	Fabio Luisi, Vienna Symphony and the Wiener Singakademie; Recorded in the Vienna Konzerthaus, April	CD: Deutsche Grammophon; Cat: 477 8031
2014	Vivica Genaux, Valentina Farcas, Davide Giusti, Fabrizio Beggi, Ugo Guagliardo	Fabio Biondi, Europa Galante and the Belcanto Chorus; Recorded in Rieti (Teatro Flavio Vespasiano), Italy, in September 2014	CD: Glossa Music; Cat: GCD 923404
2016	Joyce DiDonato, Olga Kulchynska, Benjamin Bernheim, Alexei Botnarciuc, Roberto Lorenzi	Fabio Luisi, Opernhaus Zürich orchestra and chorus Christof Loy, stage director	DVD:Accentus; Cat:ACC10353
