= Fedora (opera) =

Opera in three acts by Umberto Giordano

- Opera by Umberto Giordano
- Poster for the 1899 performances at the Teatro Verdi, Padua
- Librettist: Arturo Colautti
- Language: Italian
- Based on: Fédora by Victorien Sardou
- Premiere: 17 November 1898; Teatro Lirico, Milan

Fedora is an opera in three acts by Umberto Giordano to an Italian libretto by Arturo Colautti, based on the 1882 play Fédora by Victorien Sardou. Along with Andrea Chénier and Siberia, it is one of the most notable works of Giordano.

It was first performed at the Teatro Lirico in Milan on 17 November 1898 conducted by the composer; Gemma Bellincioni created the role of Fedora with Enrico Caruso as her lover, Loris Ipanov.

== Composition history ==
In 1889, Umberto Giordano saw Sardou's play Fédora at the Teatro Bellini di Napoli, with Sarah Bernhardt (for whom the play was written) in the title role. The play was popular, and the hat "fedora" was named after it. He immediately asked Sardou for permission to base an opera on the play, and Sardou initially refused because, at the time, Giordano was a relatively unknown composer. Following the premiere of his 1894 Regina Diaz, Giordano's publisher, Edoardo Sonzogno, asked Sardou again. However, Sardou demanded what Sozogno considered an exorbitant fee. It was only on the third attempt, and after Giordano's success with Andrea Chénier in 1896, that an agreement was reached to go ahead with the opera.

== Performance history ==
Its first performance took place in Milan at the Teatro Lirico Internazionale. Gemma Bellincioni sang the role of Fedora, and Enrico Caruso was Loris Ipanov. The opera had great success on its opening night, and was soon brought to the Vienna Staatsoper by Mahler, and then to Paris where it was reportedly admired by Massenet and Saint-Saëns. In May 1899, a few months after its world premiere, Fedora was performed at the Teatro de la Opera in Buenos Aires, Argentina with the same singers who had performed the main roles in the premiere in Milan: Gemma Bellincioni and Enrico Caruso.

Fedora received its US premiere on 5 December 1906 at the New York Metropolitan Opera, with Caruso as Count Loris, Lina Cavalieri as Fedora, and Arturo Vigna conducting. The opera received eight performances during the Met's 1906/1907 and 1907/1908 seasons, and was revived in the 1920s when it received 25 more performances between 1923 and 1926. By the mid-20th century, however, operatic tastes had changed, and outside of Italy the opera was performed less often. In Italy it maintained its popularity during the 50s, 60s and 70s, serving as a vehicle for celebrated sopranos and tenors such as Maria Caniglia, Maria Callas, Renata Tebaldi, Magda Olivero, Antonietta Stella, Marcella Pobbe, Giuseppe di Stefano, Franco Corelli, and Mario del Monaco.

The 1990s saw a resurgence of interest in Fedora, with new productions at the Vienna Staatsoper, La Scala, New York's Metropolitan Opera, Chicago Lyric Opera, the Royal Opera House, Covent Garden, the Washington National Opera and the Teatro Colón in Buenos Aires. Notable singers in post-1990 productions include Mirella Freni, Renata Scotto, Agnes Baltsa, Katia Ricciarelli, and Maria Guleghina as Fedora; and Plácido Domingo, José Carreras, and José Cura as Loris. Among Fedora's more recent performances are those at the Vienna Staatsoper in 2003, La Scala in 2004, London's Holland Park Opera in 2006, and at the Metropolitan Opera in 2022/2023.

== Roles ==
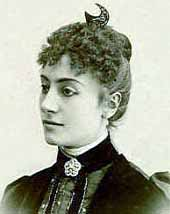
Gemma Bellincioni, who created the title role

Role	Voice type	Premiere cast, 17 November 1898 (Conductor: Umberto Giordano)
Princess Fedora Romazov	soprano	Gemma Bellincioni
Count Loris Ipanov	tenor	Enrico Caruso
Countess Olga Sukarev	soprano	
De Siriex, a diplomat	baritone	Delfino Menotti
Désiré, a servant	tenor	
Dimitri, a servant	contralto	
Gretch, a police inspector	bass	
Loreck, a surgeon	baritone	
Cirillo, a coachman	baritone	
Baron Rouvel	tenor	
Boroff, a doctor	baritone	
Sergio, a servant	bass	
Nicola, a servant	contralto/bass	
Michele, a porter	spoken role	
Peasant Boy	contralto	
Boleslao Lazinski, a pianist	(silent role)	

== Synopsis ==
=== Act 1 ===
St. Petersburg, 1881. A winter's night in the palace of Count Vladimir Andrejevich

Princess Fedora, who is to marry Count Vladimir Andrejevich the following day, arrives and sings of her love for him ("Quanti fior ... Ed ecco il suo ritratto"), unaware that the dissolute Vladimir has betrayed her with another woman. The sound of sleigh-bells is heard and Vladimir is brought in, mortally wounded. Doctors and a priest are summoned, and the servants are questioned (Dimitri: "Signore, alle otto e mezzo"; Cirillo: "Egli mi disse"). Fedora swears on the jeweled Byzantine cross she is wearing (aria: "Dite coragio ... Su questa santa Croce") that Andrejevich's death will be avenged. It is proposed that Count Loris Ipanov, a suspected Nihilist sympathizer, was probably the assassin. De Siriex (a diplomat) and Gretch (a police inspector) plan an investigation.

=== Act 2 ===
Paris

Fedora has followed Ipanov to Paris to avenge Vladimir's death. There is a reception at Fedora's house, where the Countess Olga Sukarev introduces the virtuoso Polish pianist Boleslao Lazinski. De Siriex sings about Russian women ("La donna russa è femmina due volte"); Olga counters with an aria comparing Parisian gentlemen with the wine of the widow Veuve Clicquot ("Eccone un altro più somigliante ancor"). Ipanov arrives and declares his love for Fedora ("Amor ti vieta"). While Lazinski plays for the party-goers, Fedora tells Ipanov that she is returning to Russia the following day. He is desperate because he has been exiled from Russia and cannot follow her; he confesses that he killed Vladimir. Fedora asks him to return after the reception is over to tell her the whole story. When she is alone, Fedora writes a letter to the chief of the Imperial Police in Russia accusing Ipanov of Vladimir's murder. Ipanov returns and explains that he killed Vladimir because Vladimir and Ipanov's wife Wanda were lovers. Ipanov had discovered them together. Vladimir shot at Ipanov and wounded him. Ipanov returned fire, killing Vladimir. Fedora realizes that she has fallen in love with Ipanov and that he killed not for political ends, but to defend himself and his honor. They embrace and she convinces him to spend the night with her.

=== Act 3 ===
The Bernese Oberland in Switzerland

Ipanov and Fedora are now lovers (his brief aria: "Te sola io guardo") and living in her villa. With them is her friend, Olga, who sings an aria about bicycling ("Se amor ti allena", sometimes omitted). De Siriex arrives. He teases Olga about her previous lover Lazinski ("Fatevi cor, Contessa!") and invites her on a bicycle ride. He tells Fedora that as a result of the letter she wrote to the police chief, Ipanov's brother Valeriano was arrested for his role in the plot to murder Vladimir and imprisoned in a fortress on the Neva river. One night the river flooded and Valeriano drowned. When Ipanov's mother heard the news, she collapsed and died. Fedora is anguished – she has caused two deaths ("Dio di giustizia"). Ipanov receives a letter from a friend in Russia informing him of his mother's and brother's deaths and that the cause was a woman living in Paris who had written a letter denouncing him to the police. Fedora confesses to writing the letter and begs Ipanov's forgiveness. When he initially refuses and curses her, Fedora swallows poison which she keeps hidden in the cross she always wears. Ipanov begs the doctor to save her but it is too late. Fedora dies in Ipanov's arms.

== Recordings ==
Year	Cast (Fedora Romazov, Loris Ipanov, Olga Sukarev, De Siriex)	Conductor, Opera House and Orchestra	Label
1931	Gilda Dalla Rizza, Antonio Melandri, Mirella Luba, Emilio Ghirardini	Lorenzo Molajoli, Teatro alla Scala Orchestra and Chorus	Audio CD: Gala GL; Cat: 100758
1950	Maria Caniglia, Giacinto Prandelli, Carmen Piccini, Scipio Colombo, Aldo Bertocci	Mario Rossi, Orchestra Lirica e Coro di Milano della RAI	Warner Fonit, Fonit Cetra: 5050466-2909-2-2
1961	Renata Tebaldi, Giuseppe Di Stefano, Mario Sereni, Sofia Mizzetti	Arturo Basile, Chorus & Orch of the Teatro San Carlo, Naples	Audio CD: Allegro Corporation; Cat: OPD-1272
1969	Magda Olivero, Mario del Monaco, Kiri Te Kanawa, Lucia Cappellino, Tito Gobbi	Lamberto Gardelli, Opéra de Monte-Carlo Orchestra and Chorus	Audio CD: Decca Records; Cat: 433 033-2
1985	Éva Marton, José Carreras, Veronika Kincses, János Martin	Giuseppe Patanè, Hungarian Radio Orchestra and Chorus	Audio CD: CBS Masterworks Records; Cat: M2K 42181
1993	Mirella Freni, Plácido Domingo, Adelina Scarabelli, Alessandro Corbelli	Gianandrea Gavazzeni, Teatro alla Scala Orchestra and Chorus	DVD: TDK DVD; Cat: 824121001971
1996	Mirella Freni, Plácido Domingo, Ainhoa Arteta, Dwayne Croft, Jean-Yves Thibaudet	Roberto Abbado, Metropolitan Opera Orchestra and Chorus	DVD: Deutsche Grammophon; Cat: 00440 073 2329
2015	Daniela Dessi, Fabio Armiliato, Daria Kovakenko, Alfonzo Antoniozzi	Valerio Galli, Teatro Carlo Felice Orchestra and Chorus	BD: Dynamic; Cat: 7772
2023	Sonya Yoncheva, Piotr Beczała, Rosa Feola, Lucas Meachem	Marco Armiliato, Metropolitan Opera Orchestra and Chorus	Streaming HD video: Met Opera on Demand

== Noted aria ==
"Amor ti vieta" ("Love forbids you") is the most famous aria from the opera and is often sung by tenors in recitals, especially as an encore piece. This short aria (approximately 1:51 minutes) is sung by Count Loris when he declares his love to Fedora in Act II. An immediate favourite with the audience, it was encored by Enrico Caruso on the opera's opening night. Caruso can be heard singing the aria, accompanied on the piano by Giordano himself, on Volume 1 of Enrico Caruso – The Complete Opera Recordings (Naxos 8.110703). This recording was made in 1902.
