= Antonietta Pastori =

Italian opera singer

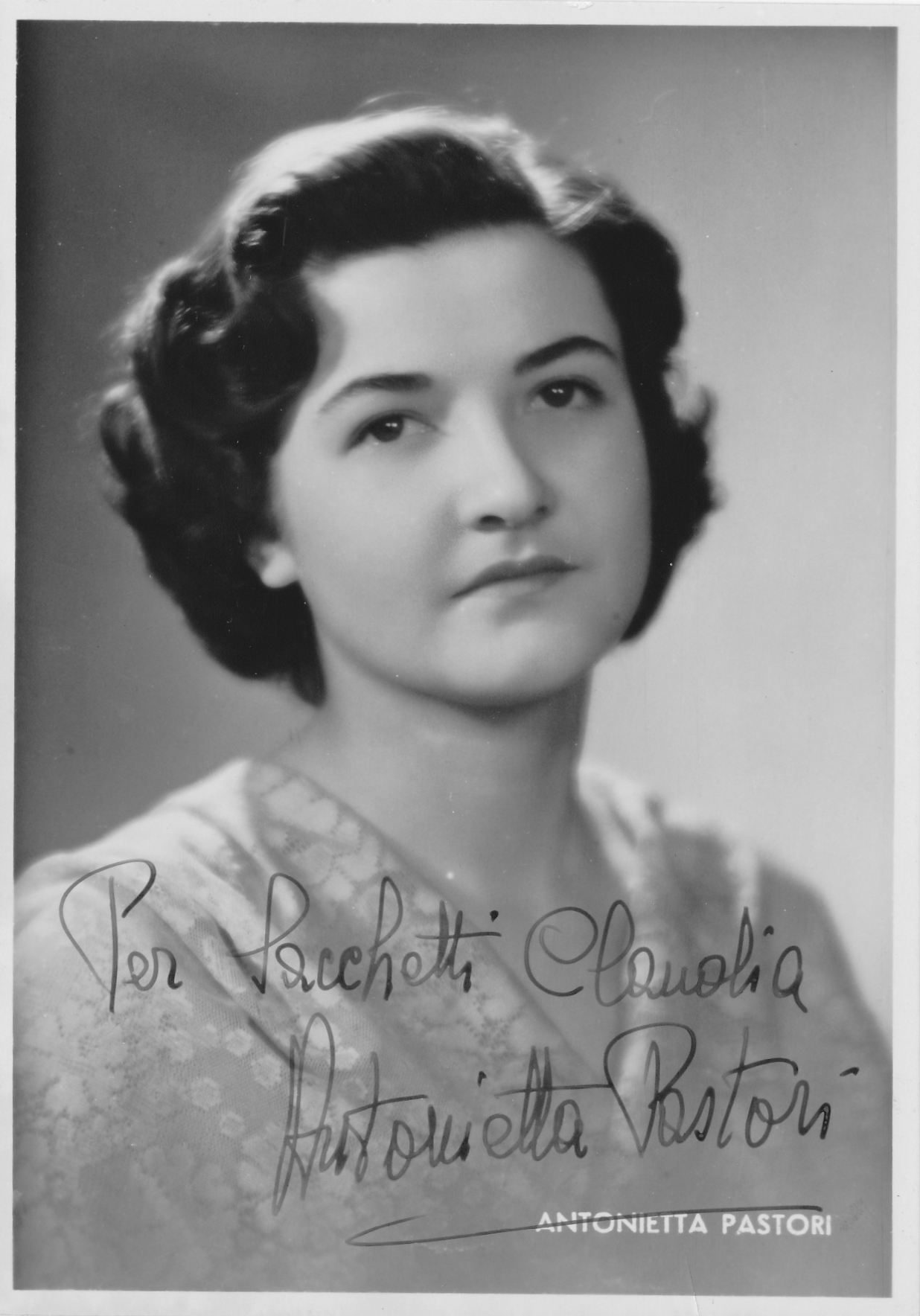

Antonietta Pastori (born 1929) is an Italian operatic soprano, particularly associated with lighter lyric and coloratura roles.

Antonietta Pastori

Born in Milan, Pastori studied piano and singing at the Milan Conservatory. She made her debut at the Teatro Nuovo in 1951, as Gilda in Rigoletto, and at La Scala in 1956, in Niccolò Piccinni's opera La buona figliuola. She was a regular guest at the Teatro di San Carlo in Naples, as well as other theatres in Italy.

She also appeared on Italian radio and television, notably in 1954, as Rosina in Il barbiere di Siviglia, opposite Rolando Panerai and Nicola Monti, in 1955, as Marguerite in Les Huguenots, opposite Giacomo Lauri-Volpi and in 1958 as Giulietta in I Capuleti e i Montecchi, opposite Fiorenza Cossotto.

She enjoyed a career outside Italy as well, appearing notably in Madrid, Barcelona, Paris, London, Dublin, and Amsterdam, where she sang Rosina, Lucia and Gilda. She was much acclaimed at the Glyndebourne Festival in 1957, as Elvira in L'italiana in Algeri and Nanetta in Falstaff.
