= Amalia Schütz Oldosi =

Austrian opera singer

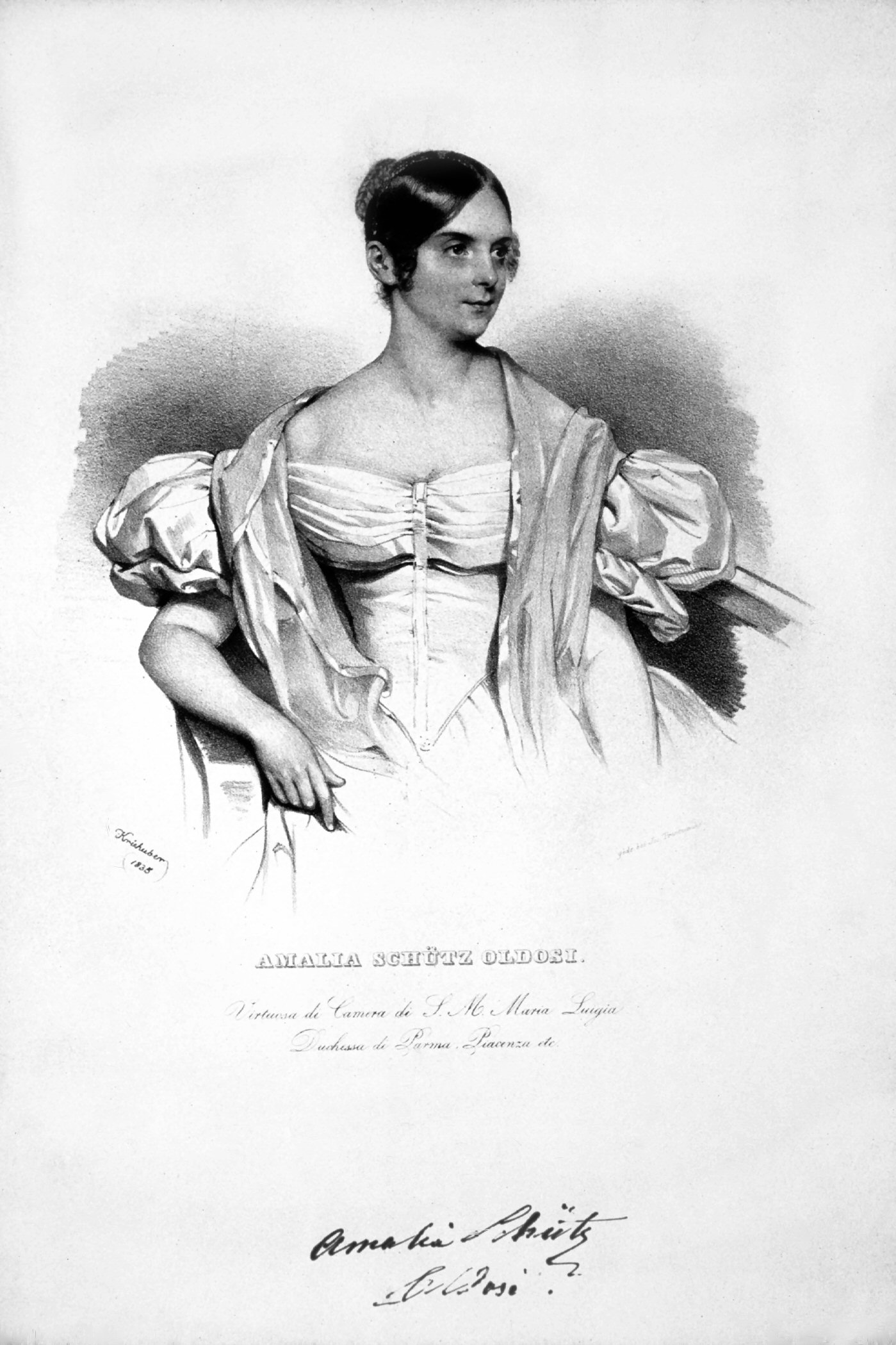
- Amalia Schütz, lithography by Josef Kriehuber, 1835
- Born: 22 January 1803; Vienna, Austria
- Died: 21 September 1852 (aged 49); Baden bei Wien
- Occupations: Operatic soprano; Music educator

Amalie Schütz (22 January 1803 – 21 September 1852) known under the stage name Amalia Schütz Oldosi, was an early 19th-century Austrian soprano who performed in Austria, France, England and Italy.

== Biography ==
Born in Baden bei Wien near Vienna, the daughter of the Viennese painter Joseph Holdhaus, Schütz received her training in Vienna from Antonio Salieri and Giuseppe Tomaselli. She made her debut in 1821 at the Theater an der Wien, where she sang roles by Rossini as soprano or mezzo-soprano. In 1820 she married the baritone Joseph Schütz, also hired by this theatre.

In 1822–1823, she sang at the Wiener Hofoper, and replaced Schröder-Devrient in the title role in Conradin Kreutzer's Cordelia, a role she will take over as part of her international career at the Amsterdamer German theatre. In 1825, she performed in Paris, where she forged her stage name "Schütz-Oldosi", composing her husband's name and an Italianized form of her maiden name. She quickly became one of the first female singers of the time, facing Giuditta Pasta and Joséphine Fodor-Mainvielle. In 1828, she sang at the Théâtre italien de Paris the role of Elena in Rossini's La donna del lago, which she also gave at the King's Theatre of London.

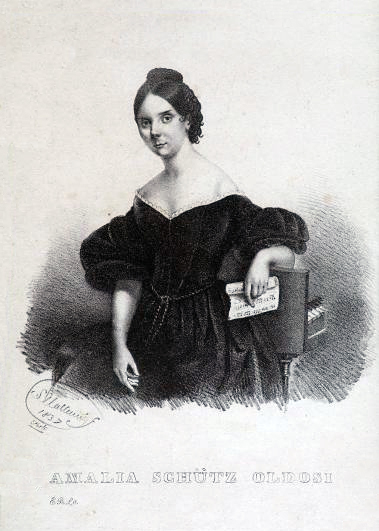
Lithography of S. Matteucci: Amalia Schütz Oldosi (1837)

The highlight of his career took place in Italy. In 1830, Schütz made her debut at La Scala of Milan as Giulietta in Bellini's I Capuleti e i Montecchi. She then went on to perform at opera stages in Naples, Florence, Bologna, Lucca and Rome to sing Rossini, Bellini and Donizetti.

In 1835, she returned to Vienna for the Italian Opera Festival and sang again at the Hofoper in Bellini's La sonnambula and Donizetti's Anna Bolena. In 1836, she premiered in Naples the role of Serafina in Donizetti's Il campanello.

In 1838, she withdrew from the stage and devoted herself solely to concerts. She then moved to Vienna as a singing teacher. She was invited once again to London, shortly before her death at age 49.

Amalie Schütz is buried at the St. Helena Cemetery of Baden.

== Bibliography ==
- Edith Grünsteidl: Die Geschichte des Linzer Landständischen Theaters im 19. Jahrhundert, Dissertation, Universität Wien 1970.
- C. Höslinger, H. Reitterer: "Schütz Amalie". In: Österreichisches Biographisches Lexikon 1815–1950 (ÖBL). Vol. 11, Austrian Academy of Sciences, Vienna 1999, ISBN 3-7001-2803-7, p. 299 f. (Direct links to "p. 299", "p. 300")
