= Giuditta Grisi =

Italian opera singer (1805–1840)

Giuditta Grisi

Giuditta Grisi (28 July 1805 – 1 May 1840) was an Italian operatic mezzo-soprano, sister of soprano Giulia Grisi and cousin of ballerina Carlotta Grisi.

She was born and studied in Milan, and made her debut in Vienna, as Faliero in Bianca e Faliero, in 1826. She specialized in Rossini roles, which from 1827, she sang throughout Italy, also creating several roles in opera by composers such as Persiani, Coccia, Pacini, etc. Bellini wrote the role of Romeo in I Capuleti e i Montecchi for her in 1830.

She appeared in London, and at the Théâtre-Italien in Paris, singing Romeo, La straniera, La donna del lago, etc.

Superbly gifted, she suffered early from serious vocal problems, which necessitated considerable transposition and rewriting of the vocal line. She died prematurely aged only 34, at Lodi, Lombardy.

== Sources ==
- Mancini, Roland; Jean-Jacques Rouveroux (1986), Le guide de l'opéra, Paris: Fayard. ISBN 2-213-01563-5
