= Il campanello =

Opera by Gaetano Donizetti

- Opera by Gaetano Donizetti
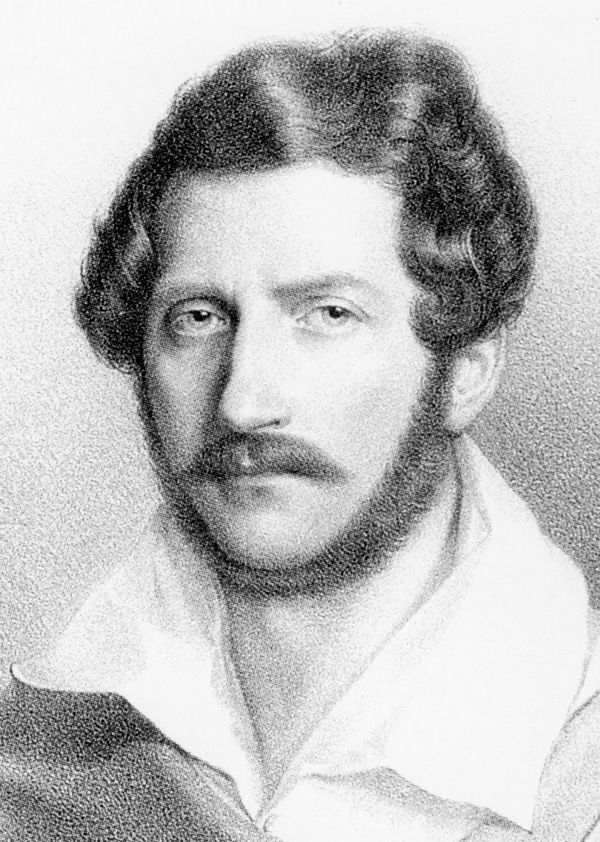
- Gaetano Donizetti c. 1835
- Librettist: Donizetti
- Language: Italian
- Based on: Mathieu-Barthélemy Troin Brunswick and Victor Lhérie's La sonnette de nuit
- Premiere: 1 June 1836; Teatro Nuovo Naples

Il campanello or Il campanello di notte (The Night Bell) is a dramma giocoso, or opera, in one act by Gaetano Donizetti. The composer wrote the Italian libretto after Mathieu-Barthélemy Troin Brunswick and Victor Lhérie's French vaudeville La sonnette de nuit. The premiere took place on 1 June 1836 at the Teatro Nuovo in Naples and was "revived every year over the next decade".

== Performance history ==
The opera was presented in Italian at the Lyceum Theatre in London on 6 June 1836 and in English on 9 March 1841. It was also given in English in 1870. It was first performed in Italian in the US in Philadelphia on 25 October 1861; this production went on to New York three days later. An English translation was seen in that city on 7 May 1917.

Among other performances, the work was staged by Teatro Regio di Torino in 1995 and by the Donizetti festival, Bergamo in 2010.

== Roles ==
| Role | Voice type | Premiere Cast, 1 June 1836 (Conductor: - ) |
|---|---|---|
| Serafina, a young bride | soprano | Amalia Schütz Oldosi |
| Don Annibale Pistacchio, an apothecary, her husband | bass | Raffaele Casaccia |
| Spiridione, Don Annibale's servant | tenor | Domenico Ronconi |
| Madama Rosa, Serafina's aunt | mezzo-soprano | |
| Enrico, Serafina's cousin | baritone | Giorgio Ronconi |

== Synopsis ==
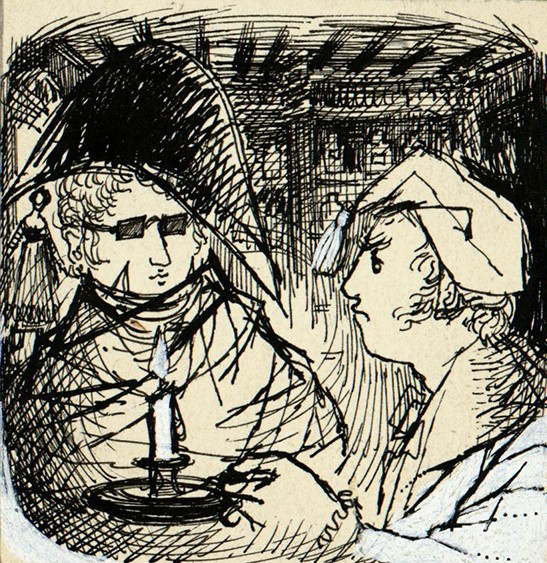
Drawing by Peter Hoffer for the cover of the libretto published by Ricordi

Time: Early 19th century
Place: Naples

At the lavish home of Annibale Pistacchio, guests have gathered to celebrate the marriage of the famous doctor to his young bride, Serafina. Among the guests is Enrico, Serafina's scheming cousin and former romantic interest who is determined to win Serafina back. After failing in his direct plea to Serafina, Enrico placates the groom with a rousing toast before leaving.

Just as Annibale is preparing for his wedding night with Serafina, the doorbell rings, revealing Enrico disguised as a patient in need of medicine. He delays the doctor's first night in his marriage bed by telling long stories and messing with the apartment. While Annibale is distracted, Enrico leaves a threatening message in Serafina's door. He then leaves only to return soon after as a singer with a hoarse voice. As Annibale's frustration grows, Enrico continues to find absurd reasons to delay the doctor's sleep. He departs and returns once more, this time as a blind man demanding a complex medicine for his sick “wife.” Annibale tries to usher him out and return to Serafina, but it is too late. Dawn has arrived, and he must leave to oversee his aunt's will in Rome. Serafina ushers him out the door, and Enrico joins the guests in reminding Annibale that the pleasures of his wedding night will follow him for the rest of his life. Everyone bids Annibale goodbye.

== Recordings ==
| Year | Cast: Serafina, Enrico, Don Annibale, Madame Rosa | Conductor, Opera House and Orchestra | Label |
|---|---|---|---|
| 1949 | Clara Scarangella, Miti Truccato Pace, Renato Capecchi, Sesto Bruscantini | Alfredo Simonetto, Chorus and Orchestra of Radio Italia | LP: Cetra-Soria 50,027 |
| 1964 | Emma Bruno de Sanctis, Alberto Rinaldi, Alfredo Mariotti, Flora Raffanelli | Ettore Gracis, Chorus and Orchestra of the Teatro La Fenice | LP: Deutsche Grammophon, 139123. Audio CD: 00289 477 5631 |
| 1981 | Agnes Baltsa, Angelo Romero, Enzo Dara, Biancamaria Casoni | Gary Bertini, Orchestra of the Wiener Symphoniker and the Wiener Staatsoper Chorus | Audio CD: CBS, MK 38450 |
| 1995 | Anna Rita Taliento, Leo Nucci, Enzo Dara, Cinzia De Mola | Fabrizio Maria Carminati, Orchestra and Chorus of Teatro Regio di Torino, (Recorded at performances in the Teatro Regio, Turin, May) | Audio CD: BMG Ricordi, Cat: 74321 35613–2, Ricordi, Cat: RFCD 2024.1 |
| 1996 | Madeline Bender, Shon Sims, Samuel Hepler, Barbara Kokolus | Christopher Larkin, Orchestra and Chorus of the Manhattan School of Music, (Recording of a performance at the Manhattan School of Music, April) | Audio CD: Newport Classic, Cat: NPD 85608 |
