= Giulietta e Romeo (Vaccai) =

1825 tragedia lirica by Nicola Vaccai

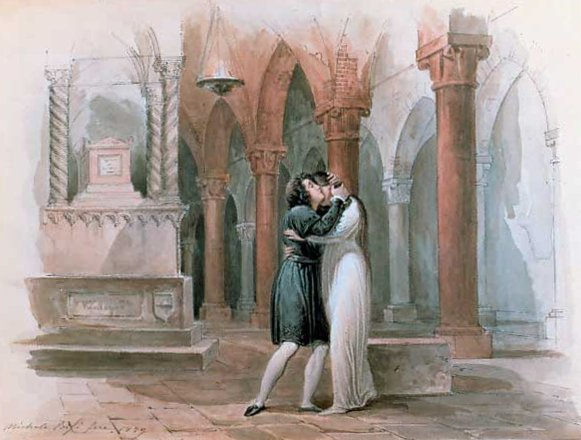
Giulia Grisi and Giuditta Pasta as Romeo and Juliet (Florence, 1829)

Giulietta e Romeo (Juliet and Romeo) is an opera in two acts by the Italian composer Nicola Vaccai. The libretto, by Felice Romani, is based on the tragedy of the same name by Luigi Scevola and, ultimately, on the 1530 novella of the same name by Luigi Da Porto.

== History ==
It was first performed at the Teatro alla Canobbiana, Milan, on 31 October 1825. It was Vaccai's last major success, although he wrote another nine operas, and is rarely performed in its full version today.

The opera was first performed in Barcelona on 26 May 1827, in Paris on 11 September 1827, in Lisbon in the autumn of 1828, in London on 10 April 1832, and in Mexico in July 1841. It was first performed in Graz (in a German translation by I. C. Kollmann) on 12 October 1833 and Budapest (also in Kollmann's translation) on 31 July 1845.

On 27 October 1832, during a performance of Bellini's I Capuleti e i Montecchi in Bologna, the next to last scene of Vaccai's opera was substituted for the last act of the Bellini opera. This was done at the request of the Romeo, Maria Malibran, and became frequent practice during the remainder of the 19th century. It was almost always done this way in Italy, and in this guise this portion of Vaccai's opera continued to be performed up to as late as 8 September 1897, when it was presented in this manner in Hamburg.

== Roles ==
Roles, voice types, premiere cast
Role	Voice type	Premiere cast, 31 October 1825
Giulietta	soprano	Joséphine de Méric
Romeo	contralto (en travesti)	Isabella Fabbrica
Capellio	tenor	Giovanni Battista Verger
Adele	soprano	Adele Cesari
Tebaldo	bass	Raffaele Benedetti
Frate Lorenzo	bass	Luigi Biondini
