= Agnes Baltsa =

Greek mezzo-soprano singer

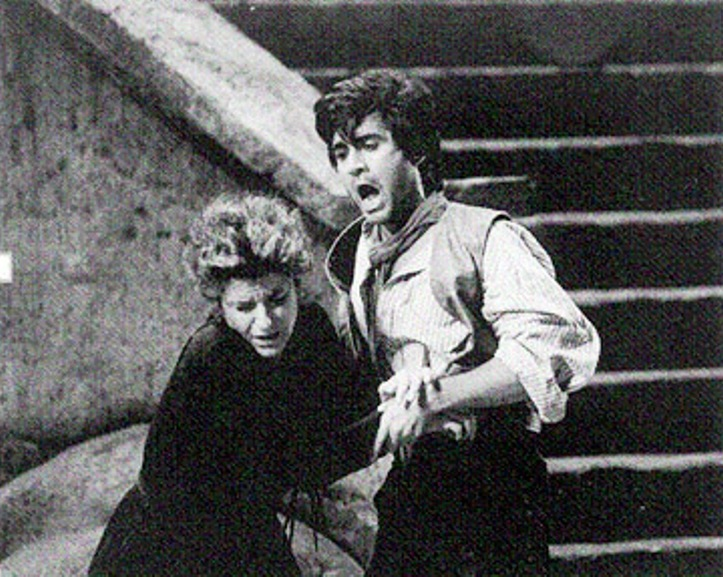
- Agnes Baltsa and Luis Lima in Cavalleria Rusticana
- Born: November 19, 1944 (age 82); Lefkada, Greece
- Education: Greek National Conservatoire
- Occupation: Opera singer (mezzo-soprano)

Agni Baltsa (Greek: Aγνή Mπάλτσα; also known as Agnes Baltsa; born 19 November 1944) is a leading Greek operatic mezzo-soprano.

Baltsa was born in Lefkada. She began playing piano at the age of seven, before moving to Athens in 1958 to concentrate on singing. She graduated from the Greek National Conservatoire in 1965 and then travelled to Munich to continue studying on a Maria Callas scholarship.

Baltsa made her first appearance in an opera in 1968 as Cherubino in The Marriage of Figaro at Frankfurt Opera, before going on to appear as Octavian in Der Rosenkavalier at the Vienna State Opera in 1970. Under the guidance of Herbert von Karajan, she became a regular at the prestigious Salzburg Festival. She became Kammersängerin of the Vienna State Opera in 1980.

Her best-known performance is that of Carmen by Georges Bizet, which she has sung a number of times with noted tenors such as José Carreras, Neil Shicoff, and others. She has also sung works by Mozart (notably Così fan tutte), Rossini (Il Barbiere di Siviglia, La Cenerentola, Semiramide, L'italiana in Algeri), Mascagni (Cavalleria Rusticana), Saint-Saëns (Samson et Dalila), Verdi (Aida, La forza del destino, Il trovatore, Don Carlos), Bellini (I Capuleti e i Montecchi), Offenbach (Les Contes d'Hoffmann) and Donizetti (Il Campanello, Maria Stuarda).

She starred in the Austrian film Duett in 1992, playing an opera singer.

In 2017, she sang Klytemnestra in Richard Strauss's Elektra at the Greek National Opera's new premises at the Stavros Niarchos Foundation Cultural Center.

== Awards, Honors, and Memberships ==
- 1980: Kammersängerin (Austria)
- 1988: Honorary member (Vienna State Opera)
- 1993: Members (European Academy of Arts and Sciences)
- Prix du Prestige Lyrique
- Deutscher Schallplattenpreis
- Gold Medal of the City of Vienna
- Gold Medal of the City of Athens
- Wilhelm-Furtwängler Award
- 2025: Lifetime Achievement Award (International Opera)

== Discography ==
=== Operas ===
Year of release	Album details	Contributing artists	Label
1976	Mozart: Ascanio in Alba	Lilian Sukis, Edith Mathis, Peter Schreier, Arleen Augér, Salzburger Kammerchor, Mozarteum-Orchester Salzburg, Leopold Hager	DG
1977	Mozart: Mitridate	Arleen Augér, Ileana Cotrubaș, Edita Gruberová, Christine Weidinger, Werner Hollweg, David Kübler, Mozarteum-Orchester Salzburg, Leopold Hager	DG
1978	Strauss: Salome	Hildegard Behrens, Karl-Walter Böhm, José van Dam, Wiesław Ochman, Heljä Angervo, Wiener Philharmoniker, Herbert von Karajan	EMI
1979	Verdi: Don Carlos	Nicolai Ghiaurov, José Carreras, Piero Cappuccilli, Ruggero Raimondi, José van Dam, Mirella Freni, Edita Gruberová, Barbara Hendricks, Chor der Deutschen Oper Berlin, Berliner Philharmoniker, Herbert von Karajan	EMI
1980	Verdi: Aida	Mirella Freni, José Carreras, Piero Cappuccilli, Ruggero Raimondi, José van Dam, Katia Ricciarelli, Thomas Moser, Wiener Staatsopernchor, Wiener Philharmoniker, Herbert von Karajan	EMI
1981	Massenet: Thérèse	Francisco Araiza, George Fortune, Giancarlo Luccardi, Gino Sinimberghi, Orchestra Sinfonica di Roma della RAI, Gerd Albrecht	Atlantis
1981	Ponchielli: La Gioconda	Montserrat Caballé, Alfreda Hodgson, Luciano Pavarotti, Nicolai Ghiaurov, Sherrill Milnes, London Opera Chorus, National Philharmonic Orchestra, Bruno Bartoletti	Decca
1982	Gluck: Orfeo ed Euridice	Margaret Marshall, Edita Gruberová, Ambrosian Opera Chorus, Philharmonia Orchestra, Riccardo Muti	EMI
1982	Donizetti: Il Campanello	Enzo Dara, Carlo Gaifa, Biancamaria Casoni, Angelo Romero, Wiener Staatsopernchor, Wiener Symphoniker, Gary Bertini	CBS
1983	Bizet: Carmen	José Carreras, Katia Ricciarelli, José van Dam, Chœurs de l'Opéra de Paris, Berliner Philharmoniker, Herbert von Karajan	Deutsche Grammophon
1983	Mozart: Così fan tutte	Margaret Marshall, Francisco Araiza, James Morris, Kathleen Battle, José van Dam, Wiener Philharmoniker, Wiener Staatsopernchor, Riccardo Muti	EMI (live recording)
1983	Rossini: The Barber of Seville	Thomas Allen, Francisco Araiza, Domenico Trimarchi, Robert Lloyd, Sally Burgess, Matthew Best, John Noble, Ambrosian Opera Chorus, Academy of St Martin in the Fields, Sir Neville Marriner	Philips
1984	Strauss: Der Rosenkavalier	Anna Tomowa-Sintow, Kurt Moll, Gottfried Hornik, Janet Perry, Wilma Lipp, Heinz Zednik, Kurt Equiluz, Vinson Cole, Wiener Staatsopernchor, Wiener Philharmoniker, Herbert von Karajan	Deutsche Grammophon
1985	Bellini: I Capuleti e i Montecchi	Edita Gruberová, Gwynne Howell, Dano Raffanti, John Tomlinson, Chorus and Orchestra of the Royal Opera House, Covent Garden, Riccardo Muti	EMI (live recording)
1986	Mozart: Le nozze di Figaro	Ruggero Raimondi, Lucia Popp, Barbara Hendricks, José van Dam, Felicity Palmer, Aldo Baldin, Robert Lloyd, Ambrosian Opera Chorus, Academy of St Martin in the Fields, Sir Neville Marriner	Philips Classics
1986	Mozart: Don Giovanni	Samuel Ramey, Paata Burchuladze, Anna Tomowa-Sintow, Gösta Winbergh, Ferruccio Furlanetto, Alexander Malta, Kathleen Battle, Chor der Deutschen Oper Berlin, Berliner Philharmoniker, Herbert von Karajan	Deutsche Grammophon
1986	Strauss: Ariadne auf Naxos	Anna Tomowa-Sintow, Kathleen Battle, Gary Lakes, Hermann Prey, Otto Schenk, Heinz Zednik, Josef Protschka, Kurt Rydl, Barbara Bonney, Dawn Upshaw, Wiener Philharmoniker, James Levine	Deutsche Grammophon
1986	Strauss II: Die Fledermaus	Lucia Popp, Eva Lind, Plácido Domingo, Peter Seiffert, Wolfgang Brendel, Kurt Rydl, Heinz Zednik, Helmut Lohner, Chor des Bayerischen Rundfunks, Münchner Rundfunkorchester, Plácido Domingo	EMI
1987	Verdi: La forza del destino	Rosalind Plowright, José Carreras, Renato Bruson, Paata Burchuladze, Juan Pons, John Tomlinson, Jean Rigby, Richard Van Allan, Petteri Salomaa, Ambrosian Opera Chorus, Philharmonia Orchestra, Giuseppe Sinopoli	Deutsche Grammophon
1988	Mozart: Idomeneo	Luciano Pavarotti, Lucia Popp, Edita Gruberová, Leo Nucci, Wiener Staatsopernchor, Wiener Philharmoniker, Sir John Pritchard	Decca
1988	Rossini: La Cenerentola	Francisco Araiza, Simone Alaimo, Ruggero Raimondi, Carol Malone, Felicity Palmer, John del Carlo, Ambrosian Opera Chorus, Academy of St Martin in the Fields, Sir Neville Marriner	Philips Classics
1989	Wagner: Tannhäuser	Matti Salminen, Plácido Domingo, Andreas Schmidt, William Pell, Kurt Rydl, Clemens Bieber, Cheryl Studer, Barbara Bonney, Chorus of the Royal Opera House, Covent Garden, Philharmonia Orchestra, Giuseppe Sinopoli	Deutsche Grammophon
1989	Rossini: L'italiana in Algeri	Ruggero Raimondi, Alessandro Corbelli, Frank Lopardo, Enzo Dara, Wiener Staatsopernchor, Wiener Philharmoniker, Claudio Abbado	Deutsche Grammophon
1990	Mascagni: Cavalleria rusticana	Plácido Domingo, Juan Pons, Susanne Mentzer, Chorus of the Royal Opera House, Covent Garden, Philharmonia Orchestra, Giuseppe Sinopoli	Deutsche Grammophon
1990	Saint-Saëns: Samson et Dalila	José Carreras, Jonathan Summers, Simon Estes, Paata Burchuladze, Chor und Symphonieorchester des Bayerischen Rundfunks, Sir Colin Davis	Philips Classics
1990	Donizetti: Maria Stuarda	Edita Gruberová, Iris Vermillion, Francisco Araiza, Simone Alaimo, Chor des Bayerischen Rundfunks, Münchner Rundfunkorchester, Giuseppe Patanè	Philips Classics
