= Karl-Walter Böhm =

German opera singer (1938–2000)

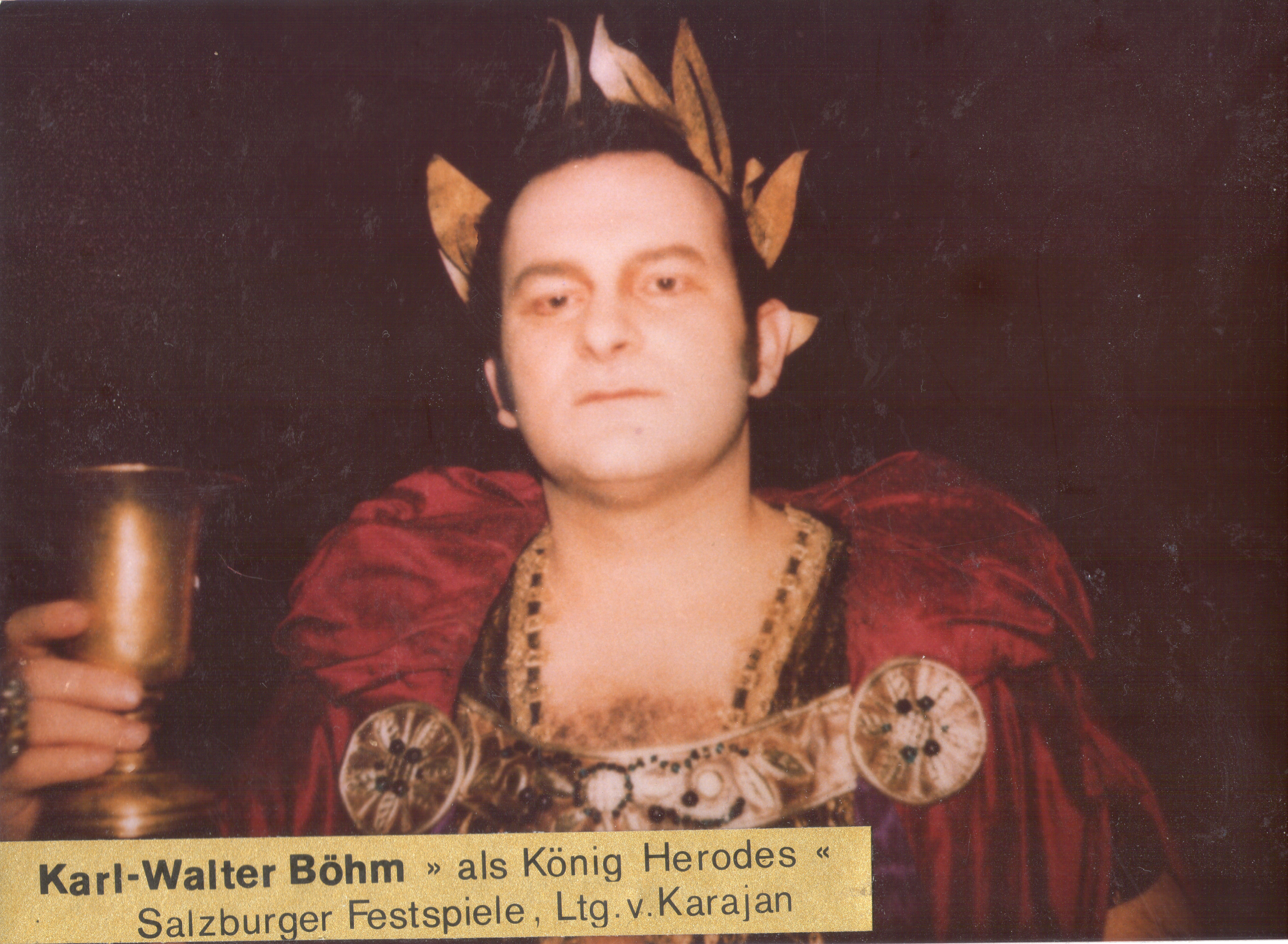
Böhm as Quing Herodes at the Salzburg Festival

Karl-Walter Böhm (6 June 1938 – 1 June 2000) was a German opera singer (heldentenor).

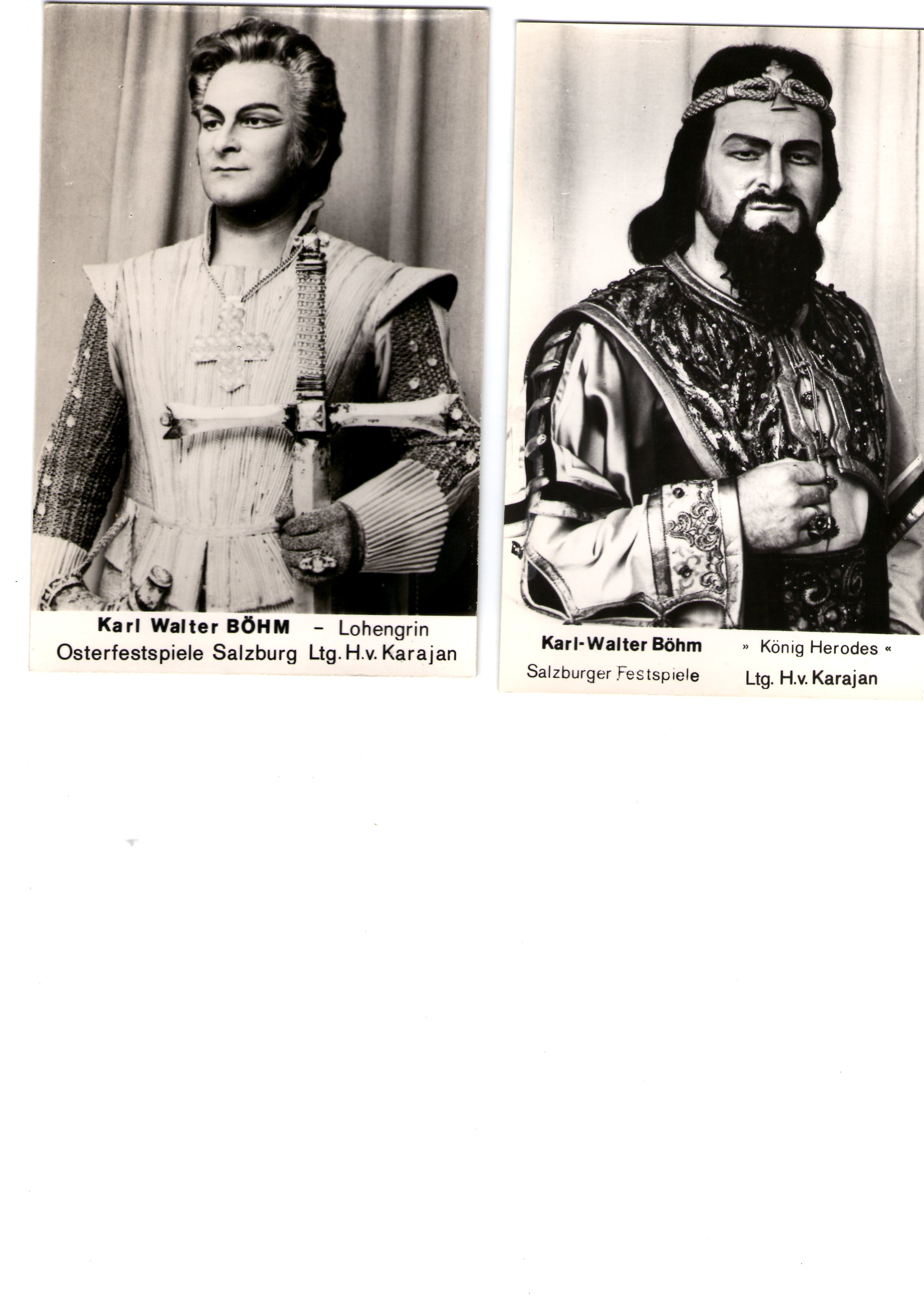
As Tannhäuser (left) and Herodes

== Career ==
In 1974 he sang Max in Weber's Der Freischütz at the Portland Opera. From 1975 to 1977 he appeared four times at the Vienna State Opera.

== Some recordings ==
- Herod in Salome (conducted by Herbert von Karajan) – Electrola
- The title role in Rienzi (highlights) – Eurodisc
