= Piero Cappuccilli =

Italian opera singer (1926–2005)

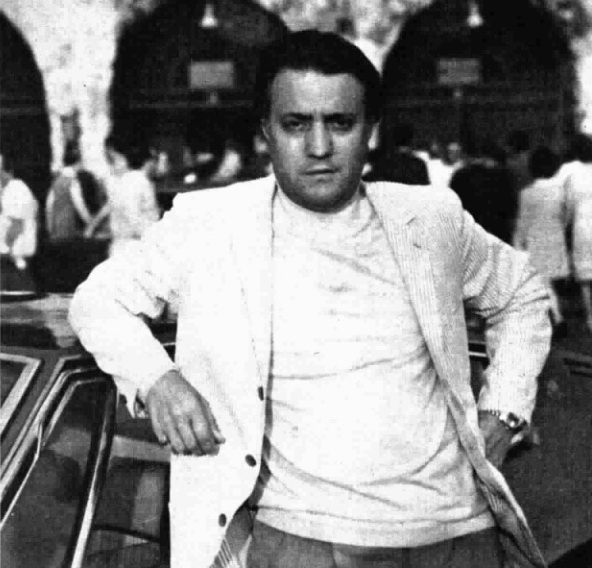
- Piero Cappuccilli (1975)
- Born: 9 November 1926; Trieste, Italy
- Died: 12 July 2005 (aged 78); Trieste, Italy
- Occupation: Italian operatic baritone

Piero Cappuccilli (November 9, 1926 – July 12, 2005) was an Italian operatic baritone. Best known for his interpretations of Verdi roles, he was widely regarded as one of the finest Italian baritones of the second half of the 20th century. He was enormously admired within the field of opera for his rich and abundant voice, fine vocal technique and exceptional breath control. In the great Italian tradition he fused words and music into elegant phrases. He focused on Italian repertory, particularly the operas of Verdi, singing 17 major roles.

== Early life ==
Born in Trieste, Cappuccilli originally intended to become an architect. He auditioned at a local opera house in 1949, where Luciano Donaggio (a retired singer beginning a second career as a teacher) heard him and urged him to study. Cappuccilli was still reluctant, believing he had a better potential career as an architect, and even briefly discontinued his lessons, until Donnaggio's urging and the offer of free lessons persuaded him to resume studies in 1950. He studied with Luciano Donaggio in his native city. After encouragement from relatives he decided to pursue a career in opera and made his stage debut there in 1951, singing small parts.

== Career ==
In 1955, Cappuccilli auditioned for La Scala in Milan, where the auditioners, deeply impressed, encouraged him to enter the Viotti competition. After his first place award, he made his official operatic debut in 1957 at the Teatro Nuovo in Milan, singing Tonio in Pagliacci. In 1960, he made his debut at the Metropolitan Opera, singing Giorgio Germont in La traviata, which was to be his only performance at the Met.

Cappuccilli spent most of his career singing in Europe, with only infrequent travels to North and South America. He made his debut at the Teatro alla Scala in 1964, as Enrico, at the Royal Opera House in London as Germont in 1967, and his Opéra de Paris debut took place in 1978, as Amonasro. He also appeared at the Vienna State Opera and the Salzburg Festival. He worked with the greatest European conductors of his time (Karajan, Gavazzeni, Abbado, Kleiber) and became one of the finest interpreters of the Italian repertoire.

Cappuccilli was highly respected as a "Verdi baritone", where his voice, vocal technique, musical elegance and stage presence were shown to their best advantage.

He recorded Lucia di Lammermoor three times, first with Maria Callas in 1959, then with Margherita Guglielmi and finally with Beverly Sills in 1970. Other notable recordings include; Rigoletto, opposite Ileana Cotrubas and Plácido Domingo, under Carlo Maria Giulini, Macbeth, opposite Shirley Verrett, and Simon Boccanegra, opposite Mirella Freni and Nicolai Ghiaurov, both under Claudio Abbado. He had previously recorded Simon Boccanegra under Gavazzeni, opposite Katia Ricciarelli. He also recorded Don Carlo, Il trovatore and Aida under Herbert von Karajan

Cappuccilli sang until his mid-sixties; an automobile accident in 1992 ended his stage career. He died in his native Trieste, at the age of 78.

== Personal life ==
He is survived by his wife, Graziella; three children, Patrizia, Giovanni and Pier Paolo; and two grandchildren, according to the Trieste newspaper.

== Repertoire ==
- Salvatore Allegra
  - Romulus (Romolo)
- Vincenzo Bellini
  - Il pirata (Ernesto)
  - Beatrice di Tenda (Filippo Visconti)
  - I puritani (Riccardo)
- Georges Bizet
  - Les pêcheurs de perles (Zurga)
  - Carmen (Morales; Escamillo)
- Alfredo Catalani
  - Loreley (Hermann)
  - La Wally (Vincenzo Gellner)
- Gaetano Donizetti
  - Lucia di Lammermoor (Enrico Ashton)
  - Roberto Devereux (Duca di Nottingham)
  - La Favorite (Alfonso XI)
- Umberto Giordano
  - Andrea Chénier (Fourquier Tinville; Carlo Gerard)
  - Fedora (De Siriex)
- Antônio Carlos Gomes
  - Il Guarany (Gonzales)
- Charles Gounod
  - Faust (Valentino)
- Ruggero Leoncavallo
  - Pagliacci (Silvio; Tonio)
- Pietro Mascagni
  - Cavalleria rusticana (Compar Alfio)
- Wolfgang Amadeus Mozart
  - Le nozze di Figaro (Antonio)
  - Don Giovanni (Masetto)
- Lorenzo Perosi
  - La resurrezione di Lazzaro (Solista)
- Ildebrando Pizzetti
  - La figlia di Iorio (Un Mietitore)
- Amilcare Ponchielli
  - La Gioconda (Un cantore; Barnaba)
- Giacomo Puccini
  - La bohème (Marcello)
  - Tosca (Carceriere; Barone Scarpia)
  - Madama Butterfly (Commissario Imperiale; Sharpless)
  - Il tabarro (Michele)
- Gioacchino Rossini
  - Il barbiere di Siviglia (Figaro)
  - Guglielmo Tell (Guglielmo)
- Richard Strauss
  - Der Rosenkavalier (Uno stallino)
- Giuseppe Verdi
  - Nabucco (Nabucco)
  - Ernani (Don Carlo)
  - I due Foscari (Francesco Foscari)
  - Attila (Ezio)
  - I masnadieri (Francesco Moor)
  - Macbeth (Macbeth)
  - Luisa Miller (Miller)
  - Rigoletto (Conte di Ceprano; Rigoletto)
  - Il trovatore (Conte di Luna)
  - La traviata (Giorgio Germont)
  - Un ballo in maschera (Silvano; Renato)
  - La forza del destino (Un chirurgo; Don Carlo di Vargas)
  - I vespri siciliani (Guido di Monforte)
  - Simon Boccanegra (Boccanegra)
  - Don Carlo (Rodrigo di Posa)
  - Aida (Amonasro)
  - Otello (Iago)
  - Falstaff (Ford)

== Discography ==
- La Gioconda, with Maria Callas, Fiorenza Cossotto, Pier Miranda Ferraro, Ivo Vinco, conducted by Antonino Votto, Columbia/EMI 1959.
- Lucia di Lammermoor, with Maria Callas, Ferruccio Tagliavini, conducted by Tullio Serafin, Columbia/EMI 1959.
- Il trovatore (film-TV), with Antonietta Stella, Carlo Bergonzi, Adriana Lazzarini, conducted by Arturo Basile, RAI 1966
- La Wally, with Renata Tebaldi, Mario Del Monaco, Justino Díaz, conducted by Fausto Cleva, Decca 1968.
- Il barbiere di Siviglia, with Margherita Guglielmi, Antonio Cucuccio, Giuseppe Valdengo, Silvano Pagliuca, Supraphon 1969.
- La forza del destino, with Martina Arroyo, Carlo Bergonzi, Ruggero Raimondi, conducted by Lamberto Gardelli, EMI 1969.
- Lucia di Lammermoor, with Beverly Sills, Carlo Bergonzi, Justino Díaz, conducted by Thomas Schippers, EMI 1970.
- Il pirata, with Montserrat Caballé, Bernabé Martí, Ruggero Raimondi, conducted by Gianandrea Gavazzeni, EMI 1970.
- Carmen, with Anna Moffo, Franco Corelli, Helen Donath, conducted by Lorin Maazel, Eurodisc/Cetra 1970.
- Andrea Chénier (film-TV), with Franco Corelli, Celestina Casapietra, conducted by Bruno Bartoletti, RAI-Milano 1973.
- Simon Boccanegra, with Katia Ricciarelli, Ruggero Raimondi, Plácido Domingo, conducted by Gianandrea Gavazzeni, RCA 1973.
- Aida, with Montserrat Caballé, Plácido Domingo, Fiorenza Cossotto, Nicolai Ghiaurov, conducted by Riccardo Muti, EMI 1974.
- Un ballo in maschera, with Martina Arroyo, Plácido Domingo, Fiorenza Cossotto, conducted by Riccardo Muti, EMI 1975.
- I masnadieri, with Montserrat Caballé, Carlo Bergonzi, Ruggero Raimondi, conducted by Lamberto Gardelli, Philips 1974.
- I puritani, with Joan Sutherland, Luciano Pavarotti, Nicolai Ghiaurov, conducted by Richard Bonynge, Decca 1973.
- Macbeth, with Shirley Verrett, Nicolai Ghiaurov, Plácido Domingo, conducted by Claudio Abbado, DG 1976.
- Il trovatore, with Franco Bonisolli, Leontyne Price, Elena Obraztsova, Ruggero Raimondi, conducted by Herbert von Karajan, EMI 1977.
- I due Foscari, with José Carreras, Katia Ricciarelli, Samuel Ramey, conducted by Lamberto Gardelli, Philips 1977.
- Cavalleria Rusticana, with Júlia Várady, Luciano Pavarotti, conducted by Gianandrea Gavazzeni, Decca 1977.
- Simon Boccanegra, with Mirella Freni, José Carreras, Nicolai Ghiaurov, conducted by Claudio Abbado, DG 1977.
- Don Carlo, with José Carreras, Mirella Freni, Nicolai Ghiaurov, Agnes Baltsa, conducted by Herbert von Karajan, EMI 1978.
- Aida, with Mirella Freni, José Carreras, Agnes Baltsa, Ruggero Raimondi, conducted by Herbert von Karajan, EMI 1979.
- Rigoletto, with Ileana Cotrubaș, Plácido Domingo, Nicolai Ghiaurov, Elena Obraztsova, conducted by Carlo Maria Giulini, DG 1979.
- Nabucco, with Ghena Dimitrova, Evgeny Nesterenko, Plácido Domingo, conducted by Giuseppe Sinopoli, DG 1982.
- Beatrice di Tenda, with Mariana Nicolesco, Stefania Toczyska, Vincenzo La Scola, conducted by Alberto Zedda, Rizzoli Records 1986.

== Sources ==
- Rino Alessi, Piero Cappuccilli: Un baritono da leggenda / The Baritone become a Legend, Comunicarte Edizioni, Trieste 2009.
- Grove Music Online, J.B. Steane, Oxford University Press, 2008.
- Opera News, Obituaries, October 2005.
