= Heinz Wallberg =

German conductor

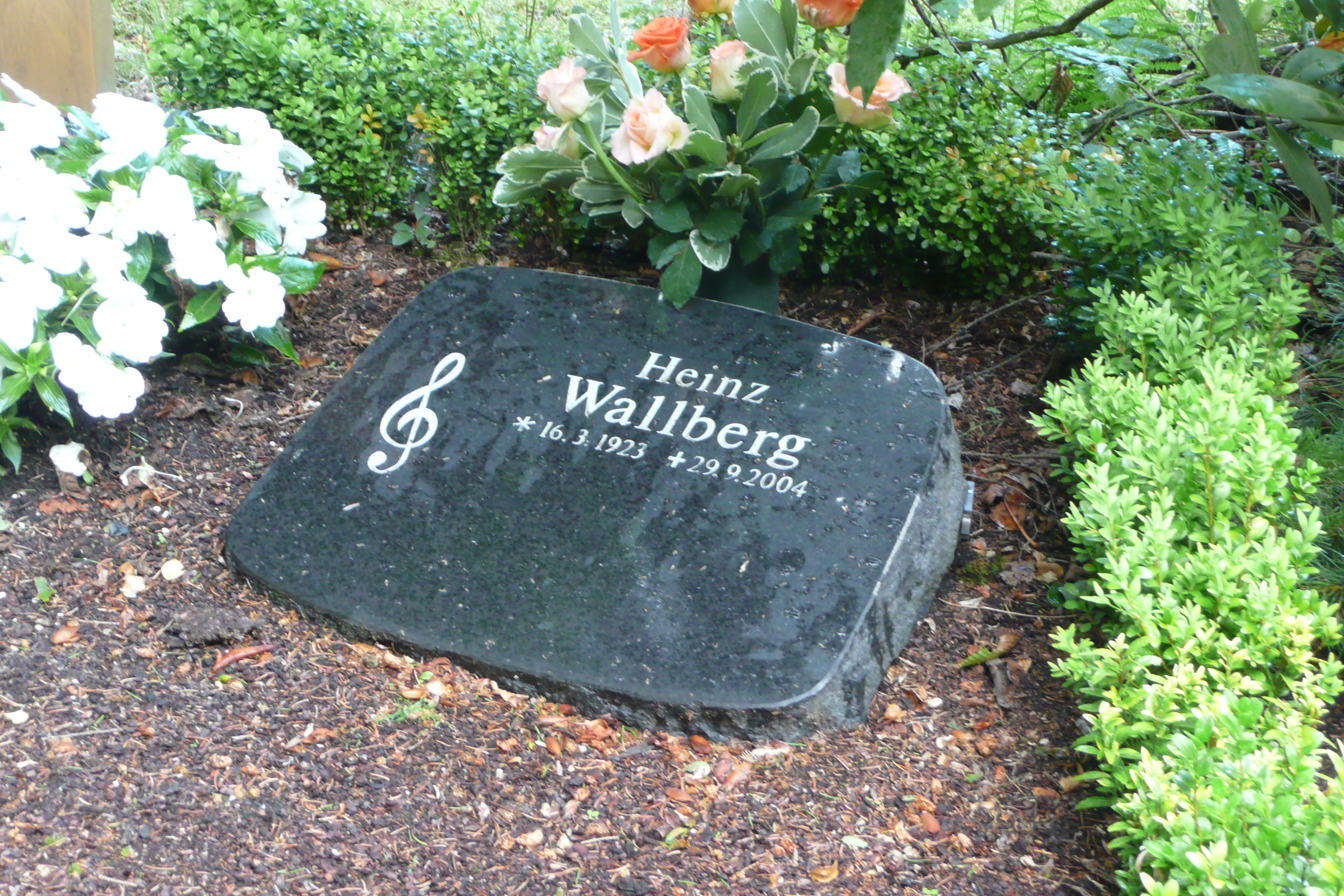
Grabstätte Heinz Wallberg

Heinz Wallberg (16 March 1923 – 29 September 2004) was a German conductor.

Wallberg was born in Herringen, Westphalia. He studied trumpet, violin and piano. He helped to support his family with his musical training after his father became unable to work. During World War II, he was a morse code operator, and simultaneously directed an army band and led a string quartet.

After the war, he studied at the Dortmund and Cologne conservatories. He made his debut as a conductor in Münster with Mozart's The Marriage of Figaro. He became principal music director in Augsburg in 1954, and in Bremen in 1955, concluding in both posts in 1960. In 1957, he recorded a scene from Wagner's Lohengrin, with the Philharmonia Orchestra in London and the singers Elisabeth Schwarzkopf and Christa Ludwig, under the production of Walter Legge. He also recorded Mendelssohn's Symphony No. 4 Italian, and his A Midsummer Night's Dream incidental music. He conducted Richard Strauss's Der Rosenkavalier for the Royal Opera, Covent Garden in 1963. In the meantime, at the Vienna and Salzburg festivals he premiered works such as Frank Martin's oratorio Le Mystere de la Nativité (1960) and Rudolf Wagner-Régeny's The Mines at Falun (1961). Wallberg inaugurated the Munich Opera Festival in 1962 with a performance of Richard Strauss's Die schweigsame Frau.

From 1964 to 1975, Wallberg was principal conductor of the Tonkünstler Orchestra, Vienna. He held the same post with the Munich Radio Orchestra from 1975 to 1982, and with the Essen Philharmonic from 1975 to 1991. He was the first West German conductor allowed to conduct in East Germany after the partition of Germany. His United States conducting debut did not occur until 1991. For the last 37 years of his life, he appeared every year with Japan's NHK Symphony Orchestra. He conducted the New Zealand premiere of Wagner's Die Meistersinger von Nürnberg in 1990.

He was nominated for a Grammy award in 1982 for his recording of Weinberger's opera Schwanda the Bagpiper. He gave a concert in St. Peter's Basilica, Rome, for Pope John XXIII in 1959. Heinz Wallberg was highly regarded as a conductor of the symphonies of Anton Bruckner. Other recordings included Engelbert Humperdinck's Königskinder and La bohème of Ruggero Leoncavallo.

Wallberg was married twice, to Maritta Ruhlmann, who died in 1967, and later to Murielle Nouget. He had a daughter with Ruhlmann and a son with Nouget. He died in Essen in 2004, aged 81.

Cultural offices
Preceded by Kurt Eichhorn	Chief Conductor, Münchner Rundfunkorchester; 1975–1982	Succeeded by Lamberto Gardelli
