= Dano Raffanti =

Italian opera singer (born 1948)

- Born: April 5, 1948 (age 77); Lucca, Italy
- Occupation: Tenor
- Years active: 1976 - 1990
- Spouse: Maria Rosa Nazario

Dano Raffanti (born 5 April 1948) is an Italian tenor, particularly associated with the Italian baroque and bel canto repertory.

== Life and career ==
Born in Lucca, Raffanti trained in Milan with Rodolfo Celletti, and made his debut at La Scala in 1976, in Bussotti's Nottetempo.

The following year, he appeared at the Festival della Valle d'Itria, in Antigone by Traetta, he was to return there regularly, singing in Traetta's Le serve rivali, I Capuleti e i Montecchi, Fra Diavolo, Il barbiere di Siviglia, etc. He sang Medoro in Vivaldi's Orlando furioso, in Verona, opposite Marilyn Horne, in 1978, repeating the role for his American debut in Dallas in 1980. He also appeared at the Rossini Opera Festival at Pesaro in La donna del lago opposite Katia Ricciarelli, Lucia Valentini Terrani and Samuel Ramey in 1983, and made his debut at the Royal Opera House in London as Tebaldo in I Capuleti e i Montecchi in 1984 opposite Agnes Baltsa and Edita Gruberová conducted by Riccardo Muti. His debut at the Paris Opéra in 1985 was as Almaviva in Il barbiere di Siviglia.

Raffanti made his Metropolitan Opera debut in 1981 as Alfredo in La traviata, and later sang there the Duke in Rigoletto, Edgardo in Lucia di Lammermoor, Rodolfo in La bohème, the Italian singer in Der Rosenkavalier, Nemorino in L'elisir d'amore, and Goffredo in Handel's Rinaldo.

His roles include also Ugo in Donizetti's Parisina d'Este, Elvino in Bellini's La sonnambula, the title roles in Mozart's La clemenza di Tito and Idomeneo, Lyonel in von Flotow's Martha, Rinuccio in Puccini's Gianni Schicchi and the role title in Verdi's Don Carlos, which he performed at Turin's Teatro Regio in 1990.

Raffanti is married to soprano Maria Rosa Nazario.

== Videography ==
- The Metropolitan Opera Centennial Gala, Deutsche Grammophon DVD, 00440-073-4538, 2009
