= Gwynne Howell =

Welsh operatic bass

Gwynne Howell (born 13 June 1938) is a Welsh operatic bass, known particularly for his performances of Verdi and Wagner roles.

== Life and career ==
Born in Gorseinon, Wales, he studied at the RMCM, where he sang Leporello in concert, and Hunding, Fasolt, and Pogner in staged performances.

He joined the Sadler's Wells Theatre in 1968, and the Royal Opera House in 1970. He was also a regular guest at the English National Opera and the Welsh National Opera. His roles have included most of the major bass roles of the Verdi and Wagner repertories, such as: Miller, Sparafucile, Ferrando, Padre Guardiano, Phillip II, Landgrave, Hans Sachs, Gurnemanz, etc. He continued into his seventies to sing small roles on stage: Simone in Gianni Schicchi at the Royal Opera House in 2009 and 2016, Titurel from Parsifal at the Royal Opera House in 2007 under Bernard Haitink, and Schigolch in Lulu at the Metropolitan Opera in 2010.

Howell took part in the premieres of two of Peter Maxwell Davies's works, Taverner and The Doctor of Myddfai. He can be heard in studio recordings, as Jero in L'assedio di Corinto, Count Walter in Luisa Miller, and as Capulet in a live recording of I Capuleti e i Montecchi, opposite Agnes Baltsa and Edita Gruberova, under Riccardo Muti, at Covent Garden, in 1984.

== Sources ==
- Grove Music Online, Max Loppert, Oxford University Press, 2008.
