= Munich Radio Orchestra =

German symphony orchestra

- Radio orchestra
- Logo since 2017
- Native name: Münchner Rundfunkorchester
- Short name: MRO
- Founded: 1952; 74 years ago
- Location: Munich, Germany
- Principal conductor: Ivan Repušić

The Munich Radio Orchestra (German: Münchner Rundfunkorchester) is a German symphony broadcast orchestra based in Munich. It is one of the two orchestras affiliated with the Bavarian Radio (Bayerischer Rundfunk), the other being the Bavarian Radio Symphony Orchestra.

== History ==
A precursor ensemble to the Munich Radio Orchestra was established in the 1920s. The current Munich Radio Orchestra was formalised in 1952, with Werner Schmidt-Boelke as its first chief conductor. The orchestra's focus has historically been on light music, with particular emphasis in its early years as an orchestra for operettas. The orchestra was also historically known for its Sunday concerts.

From the chief conductorship of Lamberto Gardelli (1982–1985) onwards, the orchestra expanded its repertoire into opera, specifically Italian opera. This work continued under the orchestra's next three chief conductors, all Italians, Giuseppe Patanè (1988–1989), Roberto Abbado (1992–1998), and Marcello Viotti (1998–2005). This activity extended to commercial recordings of operas and opera excerpts with the orchestra's chief conductors.

The orchestra faced budget constraints and the threat of dissolution by Bavarian Radio in 2004. In protest at these threats to the existence of the orchestra, Viotti resigned as chief conductor that year. After negotiations, the orchestra was preserved, with a reduction in size from 72 to 50 musicians.

From 2006 to 2017, the orchestra's chief conductor was Ulf Schirmer. During his tenure, Schirmer has conducted with the orchestra commercial recordings for the Bavarian Radio's own BR-Klassik label, including Karl Amadeus Hartmann's Des Simplicius Simplicissimus Jugend. The orchestra has also recorded for other labels such as CPO, RCA, Acanta and Sony Classical.

In May 2016, the orchestra announced the appointment of Ivan Repušić as its next chief conductor, effective with the 2017–2018 season. Patrick Hahn became principal guest conductor of the orchestra in the 2021–2022 season, the first principal guest conductor in the orchestra's history. In July 2022, the orchestra announced the extension of Repušić's contract as chief conductor through the summer of 2026. Repušić concluded his tenure with the Munich Radio Orchestra at the close of the 2025–2026 season.

In June 2026, the orchestra announced the appointment of Leo Hussain as its next chief conductor, effective with the 2027–2028 season, with an initial contract of three years.

== Chief conductors ==
- Werner Schmidt-Boelke (1952–1967)
- Kurt Eichhorn (1967–1975)
- Heinz Wallberg (1975–1981)
- Lamberto Gardelli (1982–1985)
- Giuseppe Patanè (1988–1989)
- Roberto Abbado (1992–1998)
- Marcello Viotti (1998–2005)
- Ulf Schirmer (2006–2017)
- Ivan Repušić (2017–2026)
- Leo Hussain (designate, effective 2027)

== Venue ==
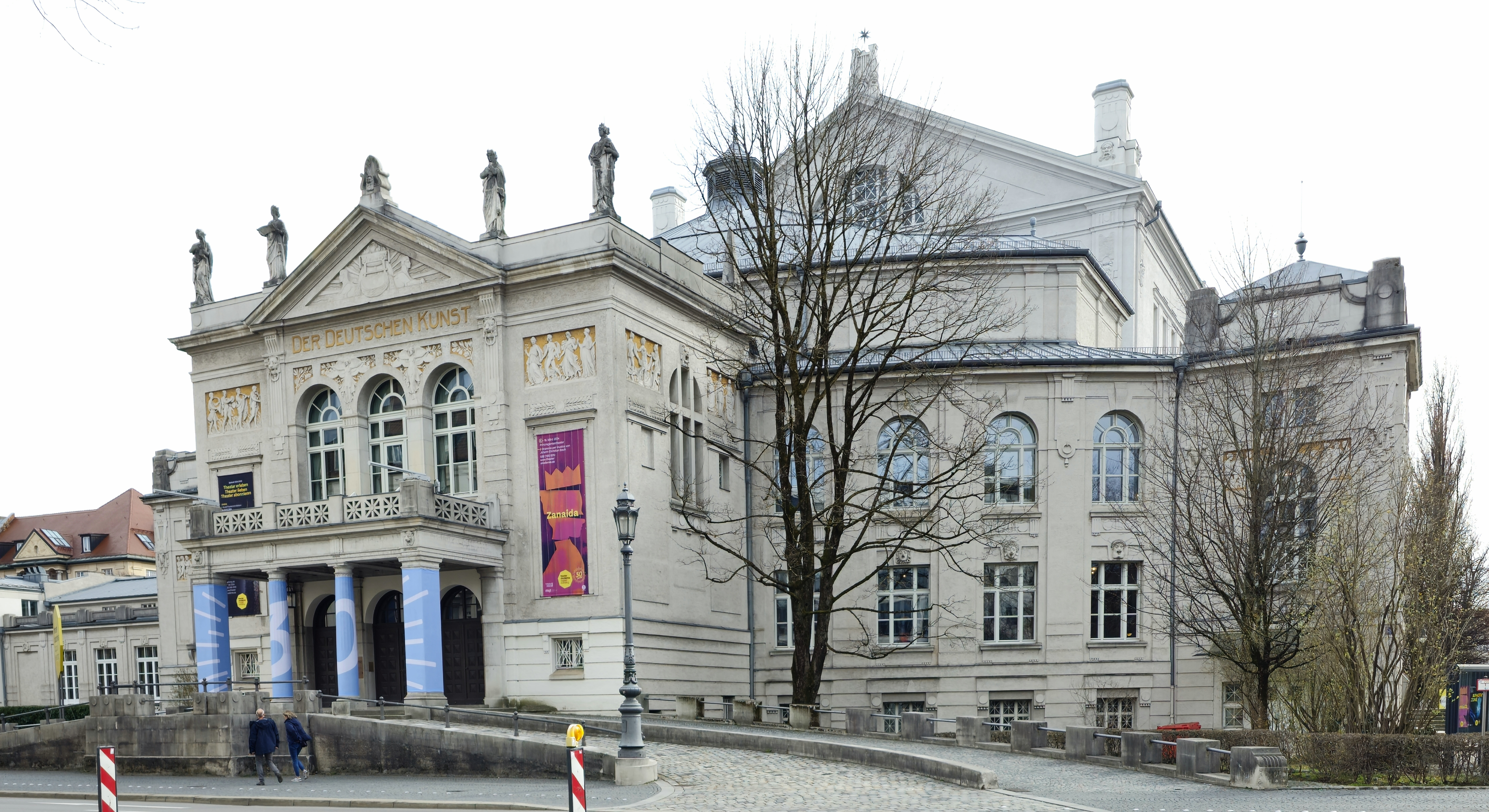
Prinzregententheater, Munich
