= Giuseppe Patanè =

Italian opera conductor

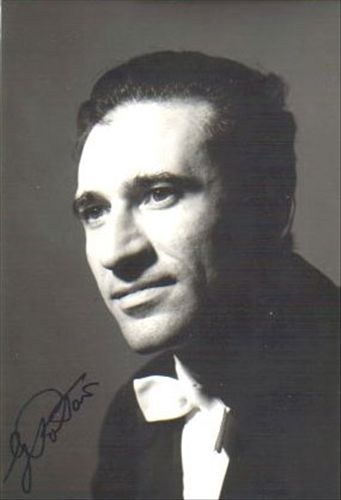
Giuseppe Patanè picture

Giuseppe Patanè (1 January 1932 – 29 May 1989) was an Italian opera conductor.

He was born in Naples, the son of the conductor Franco Patanè (1908–1968), and studied in his native city. He made his debut there in 1951. He was principal conductor at the Linz opera in 1961–62. He subsequently was chief conductor of the Munich Radio Orchestra from 1985 to 1989.

Patanè collapsed suddenly from a heart attack while conducting a performance of Il barbiere di Siviglia at the Bavarian State Opera in Munich, on 29 May 1989. He was taken to hospital where he died. He and his wife Rita, from whom he was separated at the time of his death, had two daughters.

== Discography ==
- 1986 Umberto Giordano: Fedora – CBS Records
- 1987 Giacomo Puccini: Il tabarro – Eurodisc
- 1987 Giordano: Andrea Chénier – CBS Records
- 1988 Puccini: Gianni Schicchi – Eurodisc
- 1988 Puccini: Suor Angelica – Eurodisc
- 1988 Leoncavallo: Pagliacci – Decca
- 1993 Gaetano Donizetti: Lucia di Lammermoor (highlights) – Corona Classic Collection
- 1993 Gioachino Rossini: Il barbiere di Siviglia – London
- 1993 Giuseppe Verdi: La forza del destino (excerpts) – Berlin Classics
- 1993 Verdi: La traviata – Orfeo
- 1993 Verdi: La traviata (highlights) – Berlin Classics
- 1995 Donizetti: Lucia di Lammermoor – Curb
- 1996 Verdi: Simon Boccanegra – Hungaroton
- 1998 Verdi: Aida (in German) – Berlin Classics
- 1998 Georges Bizet: Carmen (excerpts in German) – Berlin Classics
- 1998 Verdi: La forza del destino – Myto Records
- 2001 Verdi: Don Carlos (excerpts in German) – EMI Music Distribution
- 2003 Donizetti: Maria Stuarda – Philips
- 2004 Pietro Mascagni: Iris
- 2005 Vincenzo Bellini: I Capuleti e i Montecchi – Gala Records
- Bellini: I Capuleti e i Montecchi – EMI Music Distribution
- Amilcare Ponchielli: La Gioconda – Myto Records
- Puccini: Madama Butterfly – Hungaroton
- Verdi: Un ballo in maschera – GAO
- Verdi: La traviata – Madacy
- Verdi: Messa da Requiem – Berlin Classics

Cultural offices
Preceded by Lamberto Gardelli	Chief Conductor, Munich Radio Orchestra; 1985–1989	Succeeded by Roberto Abbado
