= Richard J. Clark =

American baritone

Richard J. Clark (born April 25, 1943) is an American operatic baritone. He studied at the Academy of Vocal Arts and the Juilliard School.

== Career ==
Born in Tucson, Arizona, Clark began his career at the San Francisco Opera as the Creditor in Milhaud's Christophe Colomb on October 5, 1968. He continued with that company until 1974, in Ernani (as Iago, opposite Renato Cioni and Leontyne Price); Les Troyens (as Panthée, with Régine Crespin); Salome (as First Soldier, with Anja Silja in her American début, in Wieland Wagner's production); Rigoletto (as Monterone, with Harry Theyard as the Duke); Fidelio (Second Prisoner, opposite Dame Gwyneth Jones); La forza del destino (the Surgeon, with Carlo Bergonzi); La traviata (Dr Grenvil); Pelléas et Mélisande (the Physician); Le nozze di Figaro (as Antonio); Roméo et Juliette (as Duke of Verona); The Consul (as Mr Kofner), the United States première of Der Besuch der alten Dame (as the Train Conductor II, with Regina Resnik, directed by Francis Ford Coppola); Tosca (as the Jailer, conducted by Nino Sanzogno); Aufstieg und Fall der Stadt Mahagonny (as Alaska-Wolf Joe), Carmen (as Moralès), and Of Mice and Men.

In 1981, Clark made his official début with the Metropolitan Opera, as Monterone in John Dexter's production of Rigoletto, opposite Matteo Manuguerra and Judith Blegen. The baritone continued with the company in Il tabarro (as Michele); Il trovatore (as Conte di Luna); Parsifal (as Amfortas, with Peter Hofmann and Tatiana Troyanos, conducted by James Levine); La Gioconda (as Barnaba, with Plácido Domingo); the Met première of Idomeneo (as the Voice of Neptune, in Jean-Pierre Ponnelle's production); Tannhäuser (as Biterolf, opposite Richard Cassilly); Tristan und Isolde (as Kurvenal); Aufstieg und Fall der Stadt Mahagonny (now as Trinity Moses); Billy Budd (as Mr Flint, with Dale Duesing); Simon Boccanegra (as Paolo Albiani, opposite Sherrill Milnes, in Tito Capobianco's production); Die Meistersinger (as Fritz Kothner); Parsifal again (now opposite Jon Vickers); Rigoletto (now the title role, on tour to Staten Island, in concert version); Cavalleria rusticana (as Alfio); Francesca da Rimini (as Giovanni Malatesta, with Renata Scotto and Ermanno Mauro); La traviata (as Giorgio Germont, with Luis Lima as his son, conducted by Thomas Fulton); Madama Butterfly (as Sharpless, with Scotto); Fidelio (as Don Fernando); Boris Godunov (as Tchelkalov, with Martti Talvela and Paul Plishka, in August Everding's production); and Il trovatore again (with Luciano Pavarotti, Dame Joan Sutherland, and Elena Obraztsova). His final appearance with the company was of the name part of Rigoletto, on tour to Rutgers University, in a concert version, in 1990.

Clark participated in the Met telecasts of Rigoletto (as Monterone, 1981), Idomeneo (1982), Tannhäuser (1982), and, most importantly, Simon Boccanegra (1984), all of which have been published commercially. In 1996, his album Keep a Little Christmas in Your Heart was published on Compact Disc.

== Videography ==
- Mozart, W. A.: Idomeneo (1982) as voice of the oracle of Neptune, Metropolitan Opera, conducted by James Levine, Deutsche Grammophon DVD, 00440-073-4234, 2006
