= Rigoletto (1982 film) =

1982 Italian opera film

- Directed by: Jean-Pierre Ponnelle
- Based on: Rigoletto by Giuseppe Verdi
- Produced by: Horant H. Hohlfeld
- Starring: Ingvar Wixell; Edita Gruberová; Luciano Pavarotti
- Cinematography: Pasqualino De Santis
- Music by: Vienna Philharmonic Orchestra conducted by Riccardo Chailly (orig Giuseppe Verdi)
- Distributed by: Paramount Pictures
- Release date: 1982
- Running time: 128 mins
- Country: West Germany
- Language: Italian

Rigoletto in a 1982 Italian opera film directed by Jean-Pierre Ponnelle and starring Ingvar Wixell, Edita Gruberová and Luciano Pavarotti, with the music score conducted by Riccardo Chailly. The film is based upon the 1851 opera of the same name by Giuseppe Verdi to a libretto by Francesco Maria Piave.

== Plot ==
As court jester for the Duke of Mantua (Luciano Pavarotti), hunch-back Rigoletto (Ingvar Wixell) is tasked with amusing the Duke at the expense of courtiers much to their annoyance. Recently the Duke, who lives a life of pleasure bedding as many women as possible, started noticing a young lady named Gilda (Edita Gruberová) walking to church every Sunday and vows to have his way with her. At the court, Count Monterone (also played by Ingvar Wixell) who is the father of one of the Duke's love interests confronts him for trying to seduce his daughter. Rigoletto decides to make fun of the Count causing the Duke to laugh at him, now angry, the Count casts a curse on Rigoletto.

Later, the begrudged courtiers find out that Rigoletto is living with Gilda who they believe to be his mistress, however in fact is his daughter. Attempting to humiliate Rigoletto the courtiers kidnap Gilda and bring her to the Duke's bedroom where he is waiting for her, Gilda who is infatuated with the Duke gives herself to him. Rigoletto later having learned of the Duke lying with his daughter, hires assassin Sparafucile (Ferruccio Furlanetto) to kill him in revenge. Sparafucile uses his beautiful sister Maddalena (Victoria Vergara) to lure the Duke to a tavern where he tries to seduce her. Outside, Rigoletto shows Gilda the Duke's infidelity. The heartbroken Gilda puts on men's clothing so she can return home safely without her father but returns to the tavern to overhear Rigoletto and Sparafucile plotting to kill the Duke. After Rigoletto leaves, the still eavesdropping Gilda hears Maddalena beg Sparafucile not to kill the Duke and instead kill the next person who enters the door.

Hoping to protect the Duke, the lovestruck Gilda enters the tavern and is immediately stabbed by Sparafucile, her dying body rolled up into a rug and dropped down a trapdoor onto Rigoletto's boat. Thinking it is the Duke, Rigoletto goes up the river to dispose of the body but in the distance hears the Duke singing La donna è mobile. The confused Rigoletto unravels the rug to reveal his half-dead daughter who finally dies, he realises the curse had come to pass – the distraught Rigoletto cries out in pain.

== Cast ==
- Ingvar Wixell as Rigoletto Monterone, the Duke's jester and as Count Monterone
- Edita Gruberová as Gilda, Rigoletto's daughter
- Luciano Pavarotti as Il Duca di Mantova (The Duke of Mantua)
- Ferruccio Furlanetto as assassin Sparafucile
- Victoria Vergara as Maddalena, Sparafucile's sister
- Fedora Barbieri as Giovanna, Gilda's nurse
- Roland Bracht as Count Ceprano
- Kathleen Kuhlmann as Countess Ceprano
- Rémy Corazza as Matteo Borsa, a courier
- Louis Otey as Marullo, a guest at the ball

== Filming locations ==
This staging was shot in the Teatro Farnese (Parma), the Teatro all'antica (Sabbioneta), the piazza in front of the Duomo di Cremona, the Castello di San Giorgio (palazzo ducale of Mantua) and the Palazzo del Te (also in Mantua).

== Bibliography ==
- Citron, Marcia J. (2010). When Opera Meets Film. Cambridge University Press. ISBN 9780521895750.
