= Christian Boesch =

Austrian operatic baritone

Christian Boesch (born 27 July 1941) is an Austrian operatic baritone. He is the son of the soprano Ruthilde Boesch, and studied at the University of Music and Performing Arts Vienna, from 1959 to 1964. He was the pupil of Alfred Jerger, and made his official debut at the Stadttheater, Bern, in 1966. He joined the Vienna Volksoper in 1975.

It was in 1978 when Boesch came to prominence, as Papageno in Die Zauberflöte, at the Salzburg Festival, in Jean-Pierre Ponnelle's production, conducted by James Levine. The next year, the singing-actor made his debut at the Metropolitan Opera, as Papageno. He returned for the same opera in 1981 (now with Lucia Popp and Gail Robinson alternating as Pamina, and Zdzisława Donat as the Queen of Night), and the same season sang Monsieur Presto in the Met premiere of Les mamelles de Tirésias (directed by John Dexter). In 1983, he appeared again at that theatre for their Centennial Gala and Don Giovanni (as Masetto), opposite James Morris, Edda Moser, Carol Neblett, Paul Plishka, Roberta Alexander and John Macurdy. His final appearances at the Met were in the title part of Wozzeck, in 1985.

At the Vienna Staatsoper, the baritone appeared in Die Zauberflöte, from 1979 to 1982, and, in 1980, the name part of Le nozze di Figaro. In 1989, he was seen in a film version of Der Schauspieldirektor.

In Paris, in 1991, he resumed his most famous part, Papageno, in Robert Wilson's production of Die Zauberflöte, conducted by Armin Jordan. The Kammersänger was also responsible for the concept and script of "Die Zauberflöte für Kinder," which introduced many youngsters to opera, and was published on DVD in 2007. Boesch himself is the father of seven children, one of whom is the bass-baritone Florian Boesch.

== Personal life ==
On 28 December 2018, he received the Chilean nationality by grace due to his contributions to children from both Los Ríos and Araucanía Regions through the Fundación Cultural Papageno (Papageno Cultural Foundation).

== Discography ==
- Mozart: Die Zauberflöte (Cotrubaş, Donat, Tappy, van Dam, Talvela; Levine, 1980) RCA
- J. Strauß II: Die Fledermaus [as Frank] (Gruberova, Bonney, Lipovšek, Hollweg; Harnoncourt, 1987) Teldec

== Decorations and awards ==
- 2006: Austrian Cross of Honour for Science and Art, 1st class
