= Idomeneo (film) =

Film of a Metropolitan Opera staging of Mozart's opera Idomeneo

- Deutsche Grammophon DVD, 00440-073-4234
- Genre: Opera
- Based on: Idomeneo by W. A. Mozart
- Directed by: Brian Large
- Starring: John Alexander, Hildegard Behrens, Ileana Cotrubaș, Luciano Pavarotti, Frederica von Stade
- Country of origin: United States
- Original language: Italian

Production
- Executive producer: Michael Bronson
- Producer: Clemente D'Alessio
- Running time: 181 minutes
- Production company: Unitel

Original release
- Network: PBS
- Release: November 6, 1982

Idomeneo is a 181-minute television film of the Metropolitan Opera's first staging of Wolfgang Amadeus Mozart's 1781 opera Idomeneo, re di Creta ossia Ilia e Idamante, produced by Jean-Pierre Ponnelle and performed by a cast headed by John Alexander, Hildegard Behrens, Ileana Cotrubaș, Luciano Pavarotti and Frederica von Stade under the direction of James Levine. It was recorded live on 6 November 1982, and telecast live in the United States by the Public Broadcasting Service series Live from the Metropolitan Opera. It has been released on VHS video cassette, Laserdisc and DVD.

== Background ==
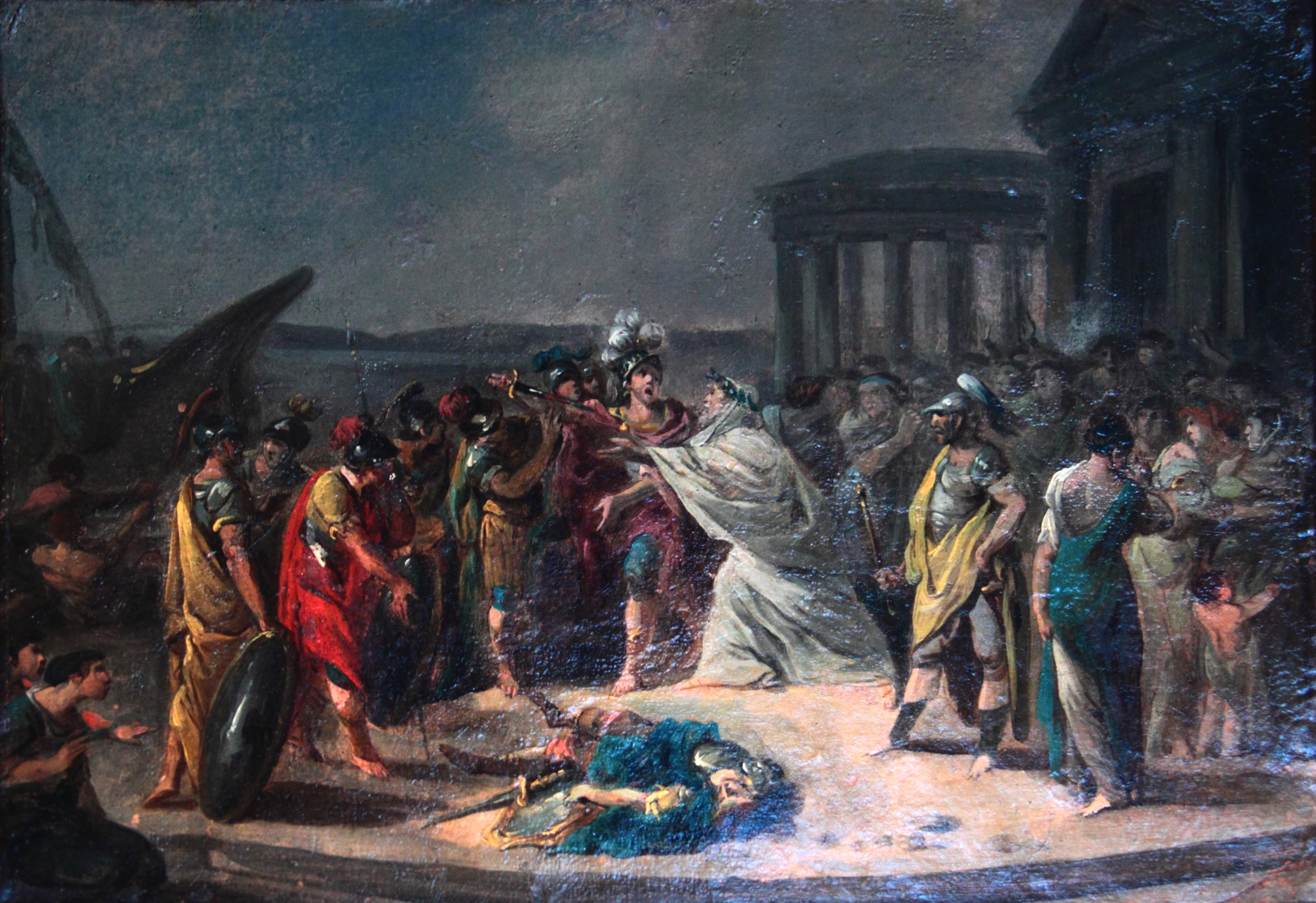
Le retour d'Idoménée by Jacques Gamelin, a painting housed in the Musée des Augustins, Toulouse

In Greek legend, Idomeneus was the King of Crete, the son of Deucalion and the grandson of Minos and Pasiphaë. A suitor of Helen of Troy, he was a major figure in the war between the Greeks and the Trojans precipitated by Helen's departure from Greece with the Trojan Prince Paris. The Odyssey relates that after the Greeks' victory, he led his men through the perils of their journey home without losing a single one of them. Later writings relate that his voyage was afflicted by a violent storm, amidst which he vowed to Poseidon, the god of the sea, that if he was allowed to set foot on Crete again, he would sacrifice the first living thing that he encountered there. Poseidon granted his wish, but when his ship finally reached his island's shore, the first creature that he met was his son, Idamantes. His slaying of the Prince in accordance with his oath was followed by the outbreak of a plague. Blamed by his people for their misfortune, he was driven into exile in Sallentum in Calabria. Later he moved to Colophon in Anatolia, settling near the temple of the Clarian Apollo. One tradition claims that he was buried there on Mount Cercaphus, while Cretans came to venerate his memory at a grave in Knossos.

In 1780, while the 24-year-old Mozart was in the employment of Hieronymus von Colloredo, Prince-Archbishop of Salzburg, he received a commission from the court of Karl Theodor, Prince-elector and Duke of Bavaria, to write an opera to be performed in Munich during the carnival season of 1781. Historians think that it was the court rather than Mozart that chose the tale of Idomeneus as a topic. Mozart based his composition upon a treatment of the legend that had been premiered in Paris in the carnival season of 1712: the tragédie lyrique Idoménée, which had a text by Antoine Danchet and music by André Campra. Giambattista Varesco, a chaplain at the Salzburg court, reshaped Danchet's libretto into a different text that was richer than Idomenée in the dramatic possibilities that Mozart craved, and which culminated in a happier ending.

Mozart's correspondence with his father records the evolution of his composition in detail. He effected several major revisions of his early ideas, some occasioned by the disappointing abilities of Anton Raaff and the castrato Vincenzo dal Prato ("Il nostro molto amato castrato Dal Prato", Mozart joked), the first Idomeneo and the first Idamante respectively. Such difficulties did not prevent Mozart from enjoying his work on his opera greatly, partly because the orchestra at Karl Theodor's court, which had accompanied the Prince to Munich after previously serving him in Mannheim, was the most expert in all Germany. Mozart's widow told a biographer that her husband's time in Munich had been the happiest of his life, and had left him with an abiding affection for the fruit of his labours there.

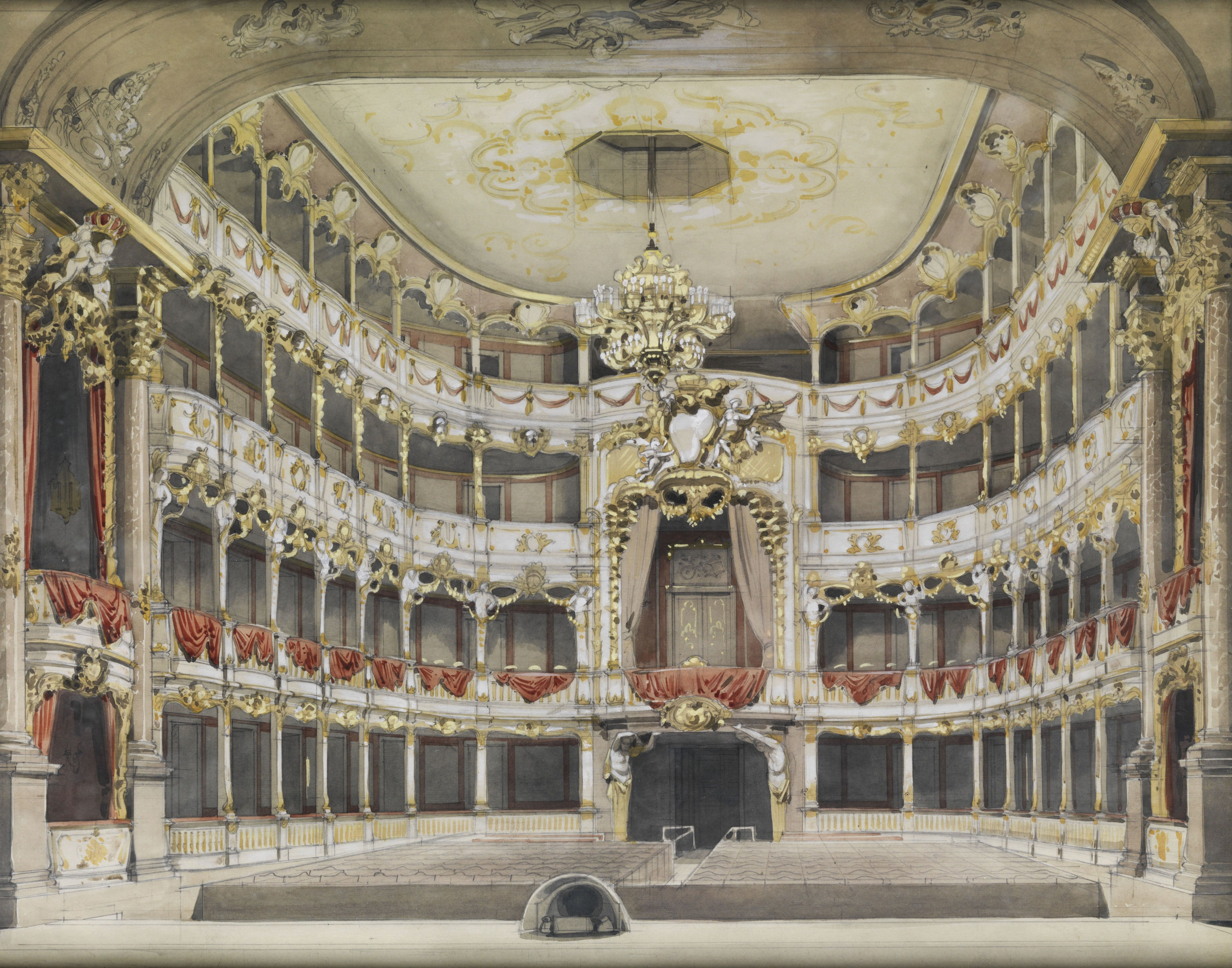
The auditorium of Munich's Residenztheater as it was in the nineteenth century

With Mozart on the podium, Idomeneo was premiered in the court theatre of the Munich Residenz on 29 January 1781, and repeated on 3 February and 3 March. The work received only one further staging in Mozart's lifetime, a production in Vienna in 1786 for which Mozart revisited his score to accommodate Idamante's being cast as a tenor. The work was first heard in the United States in 1947 at the Berkshire Music Festival in Tanglewood under the direction of Boris Goldovsky.

Modern productions of the opera have presented it in a variety of different versions. The Met's first staging in 1982 largely adhered to that conducted by Mozart in Munich 201 years earlier, but with four important exceptions. All were in act three. Elettra's aria "D'Oreste, d'Aiace" and Idomeneo's aria "Torna la pace", both cut by Mozart, were reinstated, and Idamante's aria "No, la morte" and a lengthy concluding ballet were omitted.

The televising of the Met's 1982 production was supported by the Texaco Philanthropic Foundation, with additional funding from the Charles E. Culpeper Foundation and the National Endowment For the Arts. The making of Deutsche Grammophon's DVD release of the production was supported by the Charles A. Dana Foundation.

== Synopsis ==
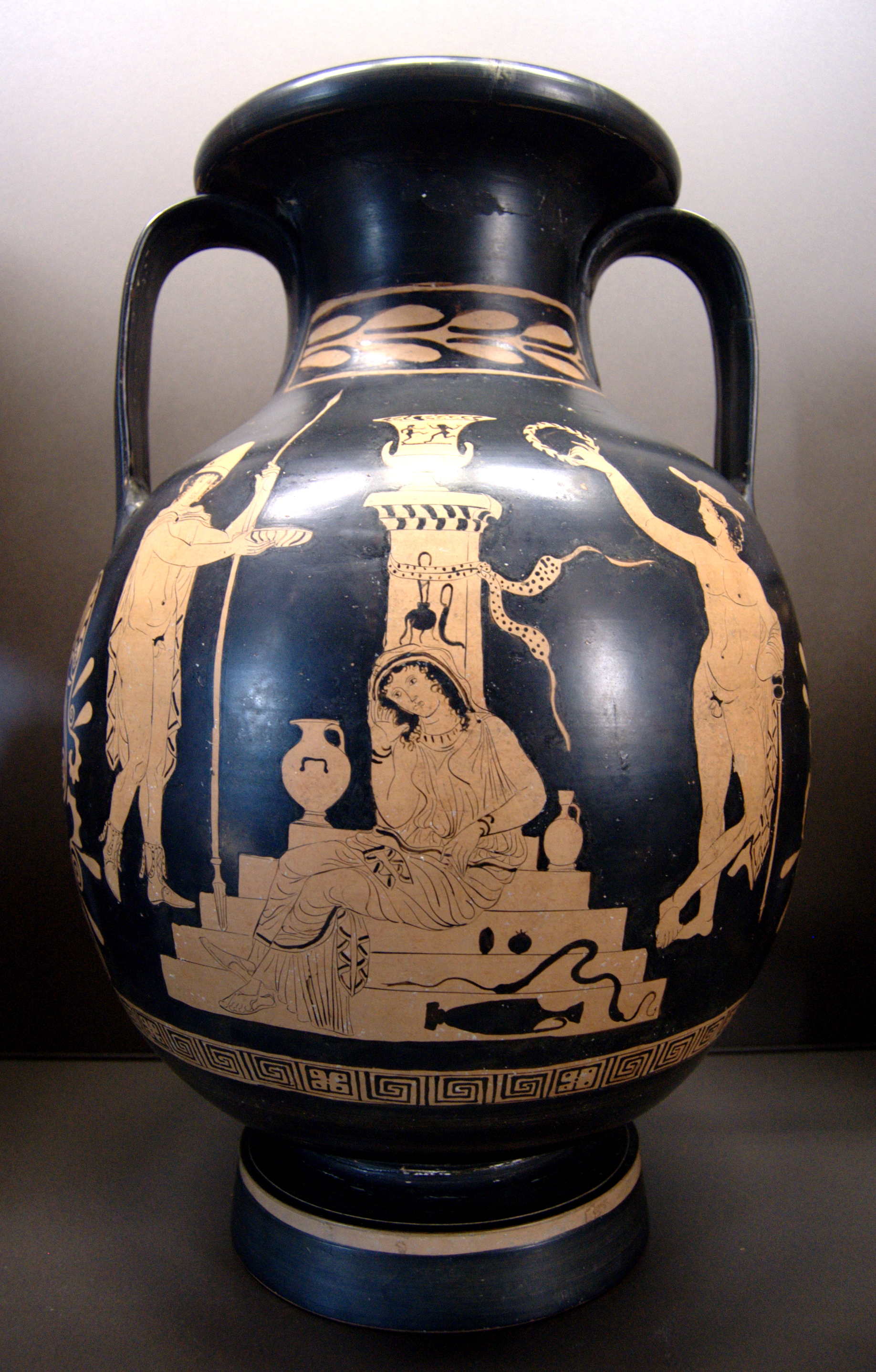
Electra at the tomb of Agamemnon with Orestes and Hermes, depicted on a red-figure pelike from Lucania in circa 380–370 BCE, from the collection of the Louvre

The opera is set in Sidon, fictitious capital of the Greek island of Crete. The Cretans are awaiting the return of their king, Idomeneo, from the Greeks' protracted, ultimately victorious campaign against Troy. Two foreign princesses are residing in the Cretan court: Ilia, daughter of Troy's King Priam, brought to the island as a prisoner of war, and Elettra, daughter of King Agamemnon of Argos, who has sought sanctuary in Crete after the murder of her mother, Clytemnestra, by her brother, Orestes. Idomeneo's son, Idamante, has fallen in love with Ilia.

Act one begins with Ilia bemoaning the conflict between her burgeoning attraction to Idamante and her loyalty to her defeated homeland. Idamante reports the sighting of his father's fleet. He declares his love for Ilia and orders the release of his father's Trojan captives. Trojans and Cretans join together in celebrating the coming of peace.

Elettra chides Idamante for his magnanimity. Idomeneo's counsellor, Arbace, arrives with the news that the king has drowned in a storm. Elettra expresses her jealous fury that Idamante loves Ilia rather than her, and vows to take a cruel vengeance on her rival.

Idomeneo's storm-battered ships reach the Cretan shore. Arbace has been mistaken in his announcement of the king's death. Idomeneo has survived, but the king's relief at his salvation is poisoned by shame and dread. He has promised Poseidon that he will repay the god's mercy by slaying the first man that he meets as a sacrifice. That man proves to be Idamante.

Father and son have been apart for so long that at first, they do not recognize each other. When the king realizes who the young man standing before him is, he rushes away in horror. Idamante is bewildered and overcome by the pain of his father's apparent rejection of him. The Cretan soldiers sing a paean of thanks to Poseidon as they disembark from the wreckage of their ships.

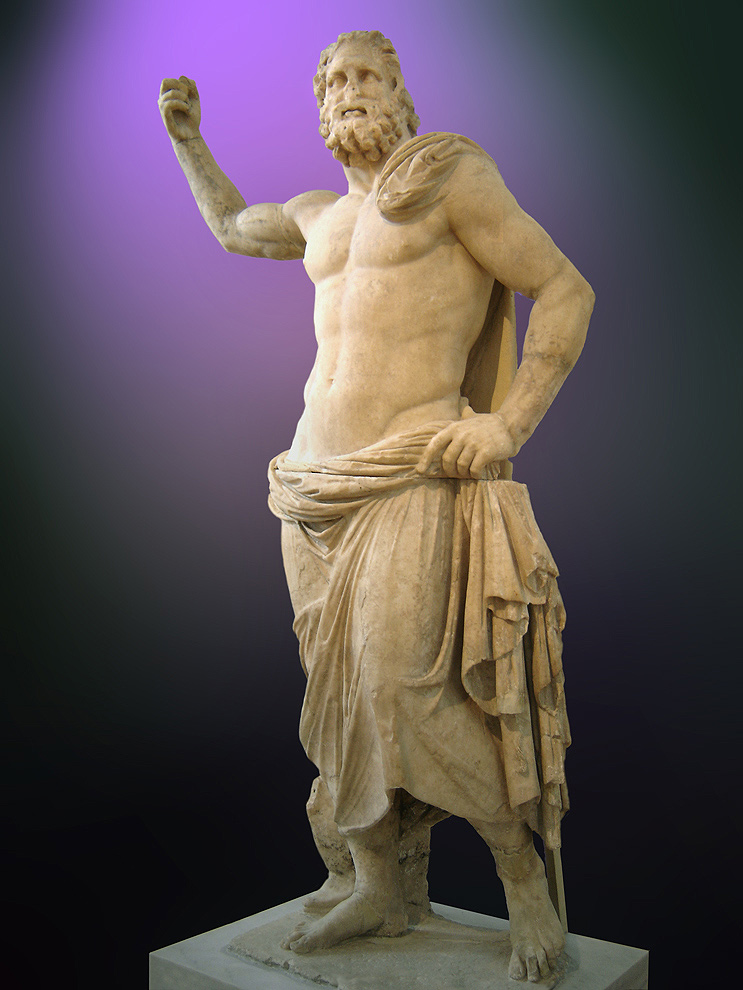
Poseidon sculpted in Milos in the second century BCE, from the collection of the National Archaeological Museum of Athens

Act two opens with Idomeneo confessing his predicament to Arbace. They agree to send Idamante abroad as an escort accompanying Elettra on a mission to Argos to claim her father's crown. Meeting Ilia, Idomeneo realizes that she is in love with Idamante and that her feelings are reciprocated, and grieves over the misery that his vow to Poseidon will entail for her as well as for himself. Elettra rejoices that Idamante will be by her side on her voyage home to Argos, and is confident that she will be able to turn the prince's heart away from Ilia. She prepares to board ship with him. Idomeneo's farewells to them are interrupted by a new storm that has been stirred up by Poseidon. Lightning ignites a terrible conflagration, and a monster rises from the waves and assaults the island. The Cretans ask whose sin it is that has aroused Poseidon's wrath. Idomeneo confesses his guilt, and asks the god to spare his subjects from a retribution that should fall on him alone. The Cretans flee from the monster in terror.

Act three begins with Ilia soliloquizing over her love. Learning that Idamante, still confused by his father's ostracism of him, intends to confront the monster in battle, she at long last tells him of her feelings for him. Idomeneo and Elettra urge him to go to Argos. The four combine in a quartet of lamentation.

Arbace enters to tell Idomeneo that the High Priest of Poseidon is leading a crowd of his subjects who wish to speak to him. The counsellor bewails the catastrophe that has befallen Crete, and wishes that it was in his power to ransom the kingdom from the sea god's fury.

The High Priest demands that Idomeneo renders up the sacrifice that Poseidon requires, and Idomeneo explains that the blood that he owes to the god is his son's. Both the people and the priest are appalled by their discovery of who it is that their king is obliged to execute. Prayers and preparations for the sacrifice are interrupted by Arbace bringing the news that Idamante's fight against Poseidon's monster has been successful.

Returned from his triumph, Idamante finally understands why his father has been so distant towards him. He willingly yields himself to be slain. As Idomeneo is about to decapitate him, Ilia offers herself to the axe in his place. Poseidon intercedes with a commandment that Idomeneo should abdicate his throne and that Idamante and Ilia should succeed him. Elettra collapses in rage and despair, and Idomeneo and the Cretans unite in a joyous epithalamion.

== Deutsche Grammophon DVD chapter listing ==
=== Disc one ===
Wolfgang Amadeus Mozart (1756–1791)

Idomeneo, re di Creta ossia Ilia e Idamante ("Idomeneo, King of Crete, or Ilia and Idamante", K. 366, Munich. 1781) with a libretto by Giambattista Varesco (1735–1805), after the libretto written by Antoine Danchet (1671–1748) for Idoménée (Paris, 1712) by André Campra (1660–1744)

- 1 (1:41) Opening credits and cast list
- 2 (4:34) Overture

Act one

- 3 (4:19) Recitative: "Quando avran fine omai" (Ilia)
- 4 (3:34) No. 1 Aria: "Padre, germani, addio!" (Ilia)
- 5 (0:23) Recitativo: "Ecco Idamante, ahimè!" (Ilia)
- 6 (2:16) Recitativo: "Radunate I troiani" (Idamante, Ilia)
- 7 (6:53) No. 2 Aria: "Non ho colpa, e mi condanni" (Idamante)
- 8 (1:19) Recitativo: "Ecco il misero resto de' troiani" (Ilia, Idamante)
- 9 (2:25) No. 3 Coro: "Godiam la pace" (Chorus, two Cretans, two Trojans)
- 10 (5:04) Recitativo: "Prence, signor, tutta la Grecia oltraggi" (Elettra, Idamante, Arbace, Ilia)
- 11 (3:27) No. 4 Aria: "Tutte nel cor vi sento" (Elettra)
- 12 (1:05) No. 5 Coro: "Pietà! Numi, pietà!" (Chorus)
- 13 (3:04) Pantomima – recitativo: "Eccoci salvi alfin" (Idomeneo)
- 14 (3:33) No. 6 Aria: "Vedrommi intorno l'ombra dolente" (Idomeneo)
- 15 (5:36) Recitativo: "Cieli! Che veggo?" (Idomeneo, Idamante)
- 16 (3:!3) No. 7 Aria: "Il padre adorato" (Idamante)

Intermezzo

- 17 (2:01) No. 8 Marcia
- 18 (6:01) No. 9 Coro: "Nettuno s'onori, quell nome risuoni" (Chorus)

Act two

- 19 (1:57) Recitativo: "Siam soli. Odimi, Arbace" (Idomeneo, Arbace)
- 20 (5:16) No. 10a Aria: "Se il tuo duol" (Arbace)
- 21 (1:12) Recitativo: "Se mai pomposo apparse" (Ilia, Idomeneo)
- 22 (5:14) No. 11 Aria: "Se il padre perdei" (Ilia)
- 23 (1:47) Recitativo: "Qual mi conturba I sensi" (Idomeneo)
- 24 (5:28) No. 12b Aria: "Fuor del mar" (Idomeneo)
- 25 (0:46) Recitativo: "Sire, da Arbace intesi" (Elettra, Idomeneo)
- 26 (1:36) Recitativo: "Chi mai del mio provò" (Elettra)
- 27 (4:28) No. 13 Aria: "Idol mio, se ritroso" (Elettra)
- 28 (1:06) No. 14 Marcia: "Odo da lunge armonioso suono" (Elettra)
- 29 (0:54) Recitativo: "Sidonie sponde!" (Elettra)
- 30 (3:40) No. 15 Coro: "Placido è il mar" (Chorus, Elettra)
- 31 (0:32) Recitativo: "Vattene, Idamante" (Idomeeo, Idamante)
- 32 (4:28) No. 16 Terzetto: "Pria di partir, oh Dio!" (Idamante, Elettra, Idomeneo)
- 33 (1:28) No. 17 Coro: "Qual nuovo terrore!" (Chorus)
- 34 (1:48) Recitativo: "Eccoti in me, barbaro Nume, il reo!" (Idomeneo)
- 35 (1:49) No. 18 Coro: "Corriamo, fuggiamo" (Chorus)

=== Disc two ===
Act three

- 1 (1:42) Recitativo: "Solitudini amiche" (Ilia)
- 2 (5:06) No. 19 Aria: "Zeffiretti lusinghieri" (Ilia)
- 3 (0:40) Recitativo: "Ei stesso vien" (Ilia)
- 4 (3:24) Recitativo: "Principessa, a' tuoi sguardi" (Idamante, Ilia)
- 5 (3:31) No. 20a Duetto: "S'io non moro a questi accenti" (Idamante, Ilia)
- 6 (1:51) Recitativo: "Cieli! Che vedo?" (Idomeneo, Ilia, Idamante, Elettra)
- 7 (6:05) No. 21 Quartetto: "Andrò ramingo e solo" (Idamante, Ilia, Idomemeo, Elettra)
- 8 (0:36) Recitativo: "Sire, alla regia tua" (Arbace, Ilia, Idomeneo, Elettra)
- 9 (3:23) Recitativo: "Sventurata Sidon!" (Arbace)
- 10 (3:51) No. 22 Aria: "Se colà ne' fati è scritto" (Arbace)
- 11 (4:58) No. 23 Recitativo: "Volgi intorno lo sguardo" (High Priest, Idomeneo)
- 12 (5:22) No. 24 Coro: "Oh, voto tremendo!" (Chorus, High Priest)
- 13 (1:08) No. 25 Marcia
- 14 (4:06) No. 26 Cavatina con coro: "Accogli, o re del mar" (Idomeneo, Chorus)
- 15 (0:38) Recitativo: "Qual risuona qui intorno" (Idomeneo, Arbace)
- 16 (6:24) No. 27 Recitativo: "Padre, mio caro padre" (Idamante, Idomeneo)
- 17 (2:16) No. 28d: "Ha vinto Amore" (Voice of Poseidon)
- 18 (3:17) No. 29 Recitativo: "O ciel pietoso!" (Idomeneo, Idamante, Ilia, Arbace, Elettra)
- 19 (3:43) No. 29a Aria: "D'Oreste, d'Aiace" (Elettra)
- 20 (3:19) No. 30 Recitativo: "Popoli, a voi l'ultima legge" (Idomeneo)
- 21 (3:52) No. 30a Aria: "Torna la pace" (Idomeneo)
- 22 (2:48) No. 31 Coro: "Scenda Amor, scenda imeneo" (Chorus)
- 23 (5:12) Closing credits

== Personnel ==
=== Performers ===
- John Alexander (tenor, 1923–1990), Arbace, confidant of Idomeneo
- Charles Anthony (tenor, 1929–2012), a Trojan
- Hildegard Behrens (soprano, 1937–2009), Elettra (Electra), Princess of Argos, daughter of Agamemnon, King of Argos
- Richard J. Clark (baritone, b. 1939), voice of Nettuno (Poseidon)
- Ileana Cotrubaș (soprano, b. 1939), Ilia, Princess of Troy, daughter of Priamo (Priam), King of Troy
- James Courtney (bass), a Trojan
- Loretta Di Franco (soprano), a Cretan woman
- Batyah Godfrey (mezzo-soprano), a Cretan woman
- Timothy Jenkins (tenor), High Priest of Nettuno (Poseidon)
- Luciano Pavarotti (tenor, 1935–2007), Idomeneo (Idomeneus), King of Crete
- Frederica von Stade (mezzo-soprano, b. 1945), Idamante (Idamantes), son of Idomeneo
- Warren Jones, musical preparation and harpsichord continuo
- David Heiss, cello continuo
- Metropolitan Opera Chorus
- David Stivender, chorus master and stage band conductor
- Gildo di Nunzio, stage band conductor
- Metropolitan Opera Orchestra
- Raymond Gniewek (b. 1931), concertmaster
- James Levine (1943–2021), conductor

=== Metropolitan Opera personnel ===
- Jean-Pierre Ponnelle (1932–1988), producer, set designer and costume designer
- Gil Wechsler, lighting designer
- Ubaldo Gardini, musical preparation and prompter
- Jeffrey Tate (1943–2017), musical preparation
- Grischa Asagaroff, assistant stage director
- David Kneuss, assistant stage director
- Lesley Koenig, assistant stage director
- Thomas Connell, stage manager
- Stephen A. Brown, stage manager
- Stephen R. Berman, stage manager
- William McCourt, stage manager
- Stephen Diaz, master carpenter
- Sander Hacker, master electrician
- Arthur Ashenden, properties master
- Nina Lawson, wig and hair stylist
- Victor Callegari, make-up artist
- Christina Calamari, wardrobe mistress

=== Television personnel ===
- Michael Bronson, executive producer
- Clemente D'Alessio, producer
- Karen Adler, associate producer
- Brian Large (b. 1939), director
- Diana Wenman, associate director
- John Leay, engineer-in-charge
- Jay David Saks, audio director
- Mark Schubin, transmission consultant
- Ralph S. Parisi, senior technician
- Frank O'Connell, technical director
- Mel Becker, audio engineer
- Bill King, audio engineer
- Michael Shoskes, audio engineer
- Robert M. Tannenbaum, audio engineer
- William Steinberg, video engineer
- Paul C. York, video engineer
- Juan Barrera, camera operator
- John Feher, camera operator
- Manny Gutierrez, camera operator
- Jay Millard, camera operator
- Jake Ostroff, camera operator
- Ron Washburn, camera operator
- Alan Buchner, videotape engineer
- Karen McLaughlin, electronic graphics
- Terence Benson, stage manager
- Gerry Crosland, stage manager
- Tony Marshall, stage manager
- John Rice, production assistant
- Brian Zenone, production assistant
- Alfred Muller, video post-production, Nexus Productions

=== DVD production personnel ===
- Roland Ott, project manager
- Burkhard Bartsch, project coordinator
- Johannes Müller, producer
- Hermann Enkemeier, screen design
- Christian Müller, video encoding and authoring
- Michael Beier, ASMI II surround sound mastering
- Richard Fairhead, subtitles
- Paola Simonetti, subtitles
- Raymond Law, subtitles
- Eva Reisinger, booklet editor
- Merle Kersten, booklet art director

== Critical reception ==
Donal Henahan reviewed the production from which the film derived in The New York Times on 16 October 1982. Idomeneo, he wrote, was maybe the best of all baroque operas. The Met's new staging of the work – the first in its 99-year history – was among the finest of its recent offerings, notable for its "sheer depth of vocal talent, grasp of the grand style and impressive décor".

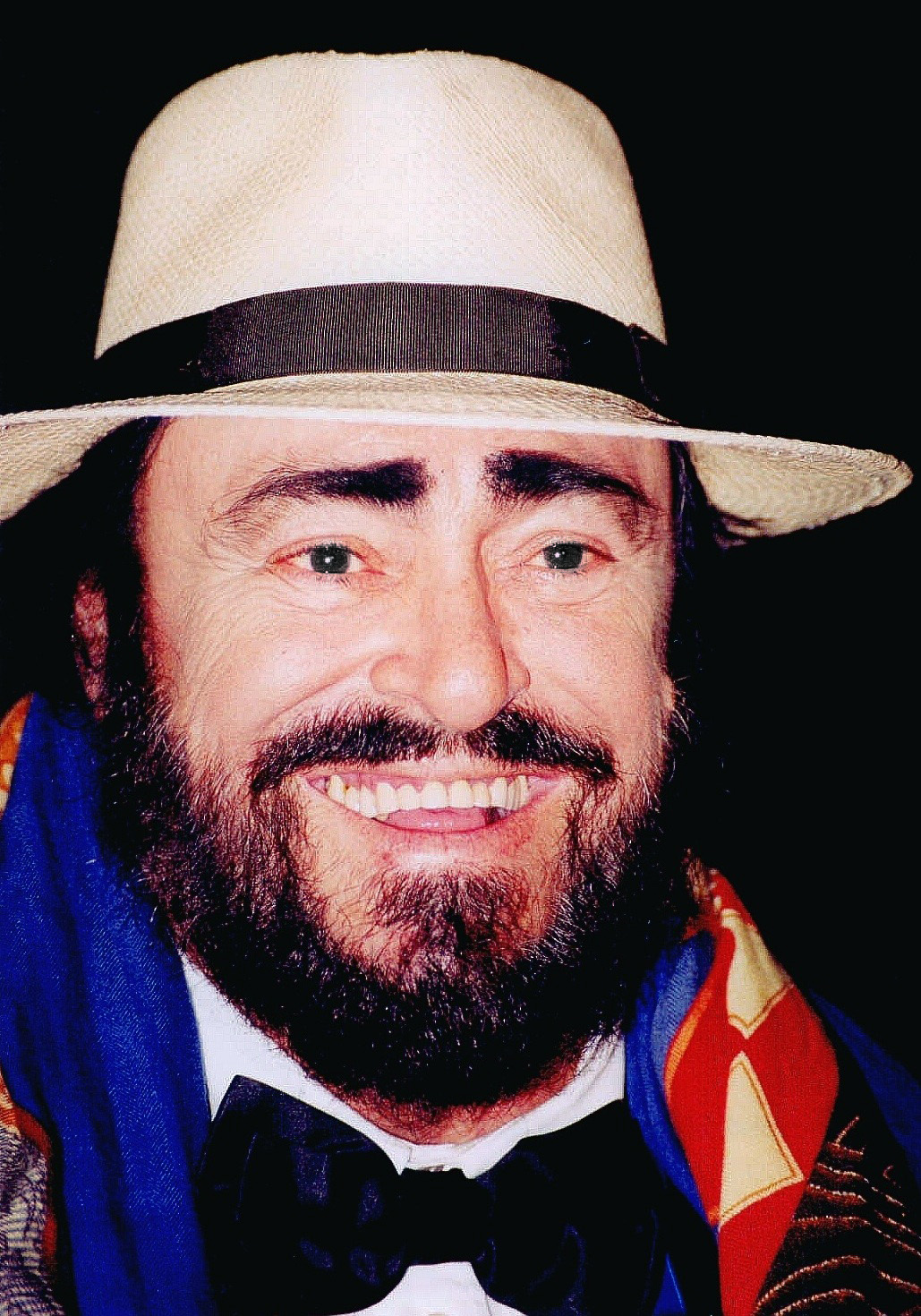
Luciano Pavarotti

The cast was a strong one, with Hildegard Behrens incandescent as Elettra and Timothy Jenkins a stentorian High Priest ("although his upper notes tended to be nasal and strained"). None of the principals was gravely disappointing either in ensembles or when singing solo. Luciano Pavarotti eschewed Mozart's protracted, technically taxing version of "Fuor del mar" for a shorter, easier version of the aria, but he did at least deliver it "with ardour and plangent tone".

This was a choice that other tenors customarily made too, but at odds with the production's overall philosophy of academic rectitude. In general, James Levine adhered to the Urtext edition of the opera performed at its premiere in Munich in 1781. Among his deviations from it were his omission of Idamante's act three aria "No la morte" and his cutting of the lengthy ballet that Mozart had composed as a finale. He also reinstated Elettra's exit aria "D'Oreste, d'Aiace" and Idomeneo's "Torna la pace", numbers which Mozart himself had discarded before Idomeneo was first heard. Levine's rendition of the opera was thus not entirely sympathetic to its idiom and epoch, but was suitable for a modern production for an audience like the Met's.

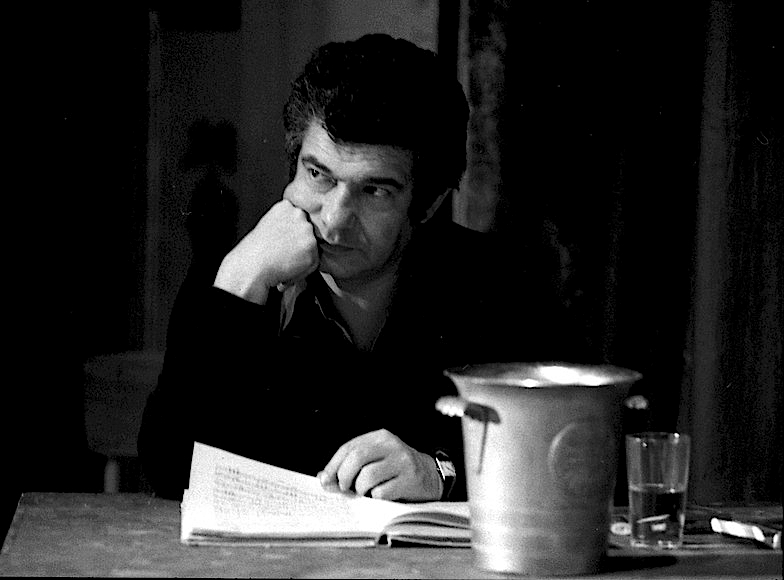
Jean-Pierre Ponnelle

Jean-Pierre Ponnelle's staging was stylistically mixed. He set the opera amidst what looked like the crumbling remains of buildings constructed by the ancient Greeks, and yet dressed his singers in apparel reminiscent of the eighteenth century. Ilia was the exception to the rule, clothed in a flowing, cream-coloured dress that did seem appropriate to the classical era. Piranesi-like scenery was presented on a series of painted scrims as if in an outsized magic lantern show. Soloists were required to strike histrionic poses of pain, regret or joy after being moved hither and thither like pieces on a chess board. The magnificent chorus was made to perform like a ballet company imitating the children's game of playing at being living statues. Initially, Ponnelle's direction of his artists seemed obtrusive and bizarre, but one soon became accustomed to it, and its emphatic exposition of the opera served Mozart very well. This was not to deny that some of the producer's contrivances were disconcerting. For example, there was a point at which the High Priest and his underlings looked like members of the Académie Française. Perhaps Ponnelle had been influenced by Daniel Heartz's suggestion that Mozart had conceived his opera as something closer to French tragédie lyrique than to Italian opera seria.

Whatever one thought of Ponnelle's contribution to the evening, he allowed his singers to communicate the profound feelings latent in Mozart's music. Frederica von Stade was "marvellously convincing" as the youthful prince (a part initially written for a castrato and later revised for a tenor). Ileana Cotrubaș was impressive from Ilia's first note to her last. Hildegard Behrens "flung herself into the villainous role of Elettra with vocal and dramatic abandon, actually stealing the last act from under Mr Pavarotti's nose". Her exit, carried off after a furious tantrum rigid with catatonia, was almost enough to make one believe that one was witnessing a genuine medical emergency.

On the whole, the production presented an ensemble in harmony with Mozart's spirit. John Alexander was a good, "if somewhat gritty-toned" Arbace, coping well with the ornamentation in arias frequently cut as dramatically superfluous. Pavarotti mostly eschewed embellishments – a couple of straightforward trills that he did attempt came across as somewhat feeble. Nevertheless, he sang with a degree of aristocratic suavity that was suitable for a sovereign, "and if he slid into tones occasionally, there was no denying that a major voice was on display".

Peter G. Davis reviewed the production from which the film derived in New York on 1 November 1982. Its only merits, he wrote, were its use of a musicologically judicious score and James Levine's pointed conducting. Jean-Pierre Ponnelle's staging was "ludicrous" and a "monstrosity". His combination of set designs evoking classical times and rococo costumes and wigs was a "tired cliché" that created "an aura of suffocating decadence that contradicts the freshness, immediacy, and dramatic brilliance of Mozart's score at every turn".

Ponnelle's directing of his singers seemed intended to elicit contempt. Elettra was a "comic-strip harridan", Ilia like "a simpering ninny", Idamante like "a petulant page boy" and Idomeneo like "an ineffectual board-room president". Some of the actions that they were obliged to carry out were almost too preposterous to describe. At one point Ilia waved her arms about as though in "an old Judy Garland routine", with Idamante prone on a staircase behind her for some reason beyond discerning. The High Priest's insistence that Idomeneo sacrifice his son was communicated by a nudge in the ribs. The moving eyelids on a vast carved face of Poseidon reminded one of a doll's. "Rarely can so much meaningless and trivial graffiti have been scribbled over a great work of art".

The casting prioritized famous names over Mozartian expertise. Ileana Cotrubaș, "inexplicably" popular on the other side of the Atlantic, had a "nondescript" voice and was "unmusical to boot". Frederica von Stade sang "tastefully but wanly", and was unable to make Idamante as imposing as he should have been. Hildegard Behrens's glowing persona was spoiled by her "inability to sing a smooth legato line" and a tone that was "unduly raucous". Luciano Pavarotti's performance was conscientious, but compromised by clumsy phrasing, breathy whispering, difficulty with ornamentation and heavy reliance on the prompter. Only in a few loud, high notes was he at his best. "A sorry mess, all in all, and a disappointment for anyone who loves this marvellous opera".

The film and the production from which it derived were also reviewed in High Fidelity, Opernwelt, Ovation and The Washington Post.

== Broadcast and home media history ==
The film was broadcast live in the United States on 6 November 1982 by PBS.

All home media issues of the film present it framed with an aspect ratio of 4:3 and in NTSC colour. In 1982, Pioneer Artists issued it on a pair of Extended Play CLV (constant linear velocity) Laserdiscs (catalogue number PA-85-134), with English subtitles and CX stereo audio. In 1989, Bel Canto Paramount Home Video issued it on a pair of VHS video cassettes (catalogue number 2372), with English subtitles and HiFi stereo audio.

In 2000, Pioneer Classics issued the film on a DVD (catalogue number PC-11498D) with optional English subtitles and Dolby Digital compressed stereo audio. Pioneer's disc is accompanied by a leaflet that includes a synopsis and notes by David Hamilton, both in English only.

In 2006, Deutsche Grammophon supplanted Pioneer's DVD with a two-disc Region 0 release (catalogue number 00440-073-4234) providing audio in uncompressed PCM stereo and in ersatz 5.1-channel surround sound DTS and Dolby Digital upmixes synthesized by Emil Berliner Studios with their AMSI II (Ambient Surround Imaging) technology. Deutsche Grammophon's DVDs offer optional subtitles in Chinese, English, French, German, Italian and Spanish, and are accompanied by a 28-page booklet that includes a synopsis in English, French and German, notes by Richard Evidon in the same three languages, a photograph of James Levine by James Umboh and five production photographs by James Heffernan and William Harris.
