= Jean-Pierre Ponnelle =

French opera director (1932 – 1988)

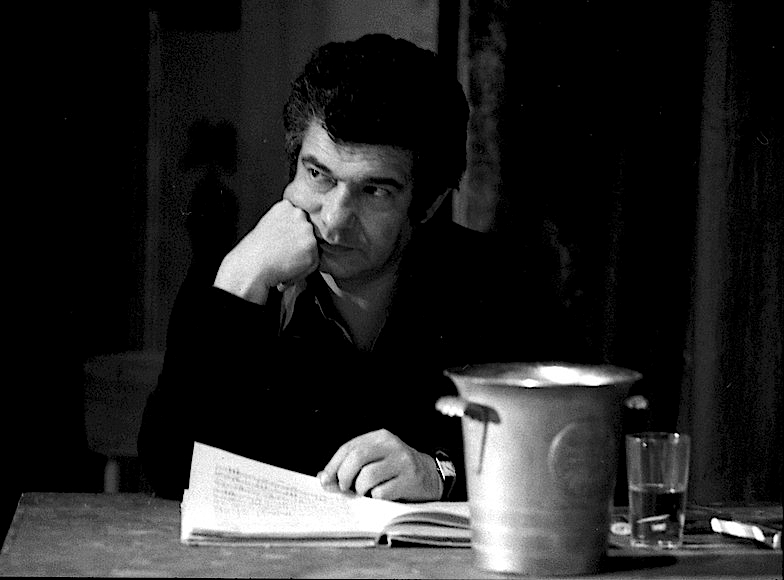
- Ponnelle in 1980
- Born: 19 February 1932; Paris, France
- Died: 11 August 1988 (aged 56); Munich, Bavaria, Germany
- Occupations: Opera director; Scenic designer; Costume designer
- Spouse: Margit Saad (1957–1988)

Jean-Pierre Ponnelle (French pronunciation: [ʒɑ̃ pjɛʁ pɔnɛl]; 19 February 1932 – 11 August 1988) was a French opera director, set and costume designer.

== Biography ==
Ponnelle was born in Paris. He studied philosophy, art, and history there and, in 1952, began his career in Germany as a theatre designer for Henze's opera Boulevard Solitude. He was greatly influenced by the work of art director Georges Wakhévitch who also designed sets and costumes for the theatre, the ballet, and the opera.

In 1962, Ponnelle directed his first production of Wagner's Tristan und Isolde in Düsseldorf. His production of that work at the Bayreuth Festival in 1981 was widely praised as one of the most aesthetically beautiful in its history.

His work throughout the world included stage productions at the Metropolitan Opera and the San Francisco Opera, and filmed versions of operas such as Rossini's Il barbiere di Siviglia conducted by Claudio Abbado with Hermann Prey in 1972, Puccini's Madama Butterfly in 1974 conducted by Herbert von Karajan with Plácido Domingo, Mozart's Le nozze di Figaro conducted by Karl Böhm with Hermann Prey in 1976, Rossini's La Cenerentola conducted by Claudio Abbado with Frederica von Stade in 1981, Verdi's Rigoletto conducted by Riccardo Chailly with Luciano Pavarotti in 1983, and Mozart's Così fan tutte conducted by Nikolaus Harnoncourt with Edita Gruberová in 1988. His 1969 production of Mozart's then neglected La Clemenza di Tito for the Cologne Opera helped re-establish this work in the repertory. Ponnelle also was a frequent guest at the Salzburg Festival.

His productions were often controversial. In 1986, Verdi's Aida at the Royal Opera House, in which he replaced the usual ballet dancers with young boys, was soundly booed and never revived, though Donizetti's Don Pasquale earlier at the same theatre had been a triumph, as were his interpretations of well-known works.

He died in Munich in 1988 of a pulmonary embolism following a tragic fall into the orchestra pit during rehearsals for a production of Bizet's Carmen with the Israel Philharmonic Orchestra conducted by Zubin Mehta. His son is the orchestra conductor Pierre-Dominique Ponnelle and his nephew is Jean Pierre Danel.

== Video recordings ==
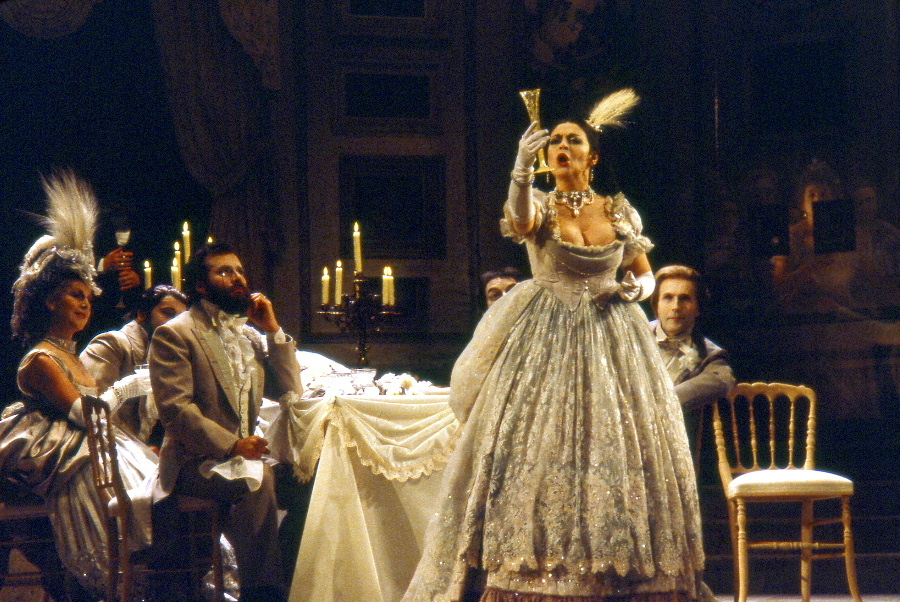
Catherine Malfitano in La traviata, 1980

- Hindemith: Cardillac – Wolfgang Sawallisch, Bavarian State Opera and Chorus. Singers: Donald McIntyre, Maria de Francesca-Cavazza, Robert Schunk, Hans Günter Nöcker. DVD: DGG 0044 007 3432 4
- Massenet: Manon – Ádám Fischer, Chor und Orchestre der Wiener Staatsoper. Singers: Edita Gruberová, Francisco Araiza, Pierre Thau, Hans Helm. DVD: DGG 0440 073 4207 7
- Monteverdi: L'Orfeo – Nikolaus Harnoncourt, Das Monteverdi-Ensemble des Opernhauses Zürich. Singers: Philippe Huttenlocher, Dietlinde Turban, Trudeliese Schmidt, Francisco Araiza, Christian Boesch. DVD: DGG 0440 073 4163 6
- Monteverdi: Il ritorno d'Ulisse in Patria – Nikolaus Harnoncourt, Das Monteverdi-Ensemble des Opernhauses Zürich. Singers: Werner Hollweg, Trudeliese Schmidt, Francisco Araiza, Janet Perry. DVD: DGG 0440 073 4278 7
- Monteverdi: L'incoronazione di Poppea – Nikolaus Harnoncourt, Das Monteverdi-Ensemble des Opernhauses Zürich. Singers: Rachel Yakar, Werner Hollweg, Trudeliese Schmidt, Paul Esswood. DVD: DGG 0440 073 4174 2
- Mozart: Mitridate, re di Ponto – Nikolaus Harnoncourt, Concentus Musicus, Wien. Singers: Gösta Winbergh, Yvonne Kenny, Ann Murray, Anne Gjevang, Joan Rodgers, Peter Straka. DVD: DGG 0440 073 4127 8
- Mozart: Idomeneo – James Levine, The Metropolitan Opera Orchestra and Chorus. Singers: Luciano Pavarotti, Ileana Cotrubaș, Hildegard Behrens, Frederica von Stade, John Alexander. DVD: DGG 0440 073 4234 3 GH 2
- Mozart: Le nozze di Figaro – Karl Böhm, Vienna Philharmonic. Singers: Hermann Prey, Mirella Freni, Dietrich Fischer-Dieskau, Kiri Te Kanawa, Maria Ewing, Paolo Montarsolo. DVD: DGG 0440 073 4034 9
- Mozart: Così fan Tutte – Nikolaus Harnoncourt, Vienna Philharmonic. Singers: Edita Gruberová, Delores Ziegler, Teresa Stratas, Luis Lima, Ferruccio Furlanetto, Paolo Montarsolo. DVD: DGG 0440 073 4237 4
- Mozart: Die Zauberflöte – James Levine, Chor und Orchestre der Wiener Staatsoper. Singers: Ileana Cotrubaș, Edita Gruberová, Peter Schreier, Christian Boesch, Walter Berry, Martti Talvela. DVD: ArtHaus 107 199
- Mozart: La clemenza di Tito – James Levine, Vienna Philharmonic. Singers: Tatiana Troyanos, Carol Neblett, Catherine Malfitano, Eric Tappy, Anne Howells, Kurt Rydl. DVD: DGG 0440 073 4128 5
- Orff: Carmina Burana (Original Source) – Kurt Eichhorn, Chor des Bayerischen Rundfunks & Münchner Rundfunkorchester. Singers: Lucia Popp, Hermann Prey, John van Kesteren. DVD: RCA 74321 852859 (Currently available in PAL format only)
- Puccini: Madama Butterfly – Herbert von Karajan, Wiener Philharmoniker. Singers: Mirella Freni, Plácido Domingo, Christa Ludwig, Robert Kerns, Michel Sénéchal. DVD: DGG 00440 073 4037
- Rossini: L'Italiana in Algeri – James Levine, The Metropolitan Opera Orchestra and Chorus. Singers: Marilyn Horne, Paolo Montarsolo, Douglas Ahlstedt, Allan Monk, Myra Merritt. DVD: DGG 0440 073 4261 9
- Rossini: Il barbiere di Siviglia – Claudio Abbado, Coro e Orchestra del Teatro alla Scala. Singers: Teresa Berganza, Luigi Alva, Hermann Prey, Enzo Dara, Paolo Montarsolo. DVD: DGG 0440 073 4039 4
- Rossini: La Cenerentola – Claudio Abbado, Coro e Orchestra del Teatro alla Scala. Singers: Frederica von Stade, Margherita Guglielmi, Laura Zannini, Francisco Araiza, Claudio Desderi, Paolo Montarsolo, Paul Plishka. DVD: DGG 0440 073 4096 7
- Verdi: Rigoletto – Riccardo Chailly, Wiener Philharmoniker und Konzertvereinigung Wiener Staatsopernchor. Singers: Luciano Pavarotti, Ingvar Wixell, Edita Gruberová, Ferruccio Furlanetto. DVD: DGG 0440 073 4166 7
- Verdi: Falstaff – Sir John Pritchard, London Philharmonic & Glyndebourne Chorus. Singers: Donald Gramm, Benjamin Luxon, Kay Griffel, Elizabeth Gale, Max René Cosotti, John Fryatt, Bernard Dickerson, Ugo Trama, Nucci Condo, Reni Penkova. DVD: Arthaus 101 083
- Wagner: Tristan und Isolde – Daniel Barenboim, Orchester der Bayreuther Festspiele. Singers: René Kollo, Johanna Meier, Matti Salminen, Hermann Becht, Hanna Schwarz. DVD: DGG 0440 073 4321 0

== Bibliography ==
- Kristina Bendikas, The Opera Theatre of Jean-Pierre Ponnelle, Lewiston/NY (E. Mellen Press) 2004.
- Max W. Busch & Margit Saad-Ponnelle, Jean-Pierre Ponnelle, 400 p, env. 350 photos n/b & couleurs, Henschel Verlag, Berlin 2008. ISBN 3894874147 – ISBN 978-3894874148
- Vera Lùcia Calabria, Jean-Pierre Ponelle und die Kamera. Anmerkungen zu Ponnelles Umgang mit den Medien, in: Jürgen Kühnel/Ulrich Müller/Oswald Panagl (eds.), Das Musiktheater in den audiovisuellen Medien. »...ersichtlich gewordenen Taten der Musik...«, Anif/Salzburg (Müller-Speiser) 2001, pp. 276–294.
- Chatfield-Taylor, Joan, San Francisco Opera: The First 75 Years, San Francisco: Chronicle Books, 1997, ISBN 0-8118-1368-1
- Imre Fabian, Imre Fabian im Gespräch mit Jean-Pierre Ponnelle, Zürich/Schwäbisch Hall (Orell Füssli) 1983.
- Kii-Ming Lo, Der Opernfilm als Erweiterung der Bühne. Versuch einer Theorie anhand von Jean-Pierre Ponnelles »Rigoletto«, in: Jürgen Kühnel/Ulrich Müller/Oswald Panagl (eds.), Das Musiktheater in den audiovisuellen Medien. »...ersichtlich gewordenen Taten der Musik...«, Anif/Salzburg (Müller-Speiser) 2001, pp. 264–275.
- Kii-Ming Lo, Die filmische Umsetzung der Ouvertüren von Mozarts Opern durch Jean-Pierre Ponnelle, in: Jürgen Kühnel/Ulrich Müller/Oswald Panagl (eds.), »Regietheater« ─ Konzeption und Praxis am Beispiel der Bühnenwerke Mozarts, Anif/Salzburg (Müller-Speiser) 2007, pp. 364–375.
- Kii-Ming Lo, Ein desillusionierter Traum von Amerika: Jean-Pierre Ponnelles Opern-Film »Madama Butterfly«, in: Sieghart Döhring/Stefanie Rauch (eds..), Musiktheater im Fokus, Sinzig (Studio Punkt Verlag) 2014, pp. 219–236.
- Kii-Ming Lo, Sehen, Hören und Begreifen: Jean-Pierre Ponnelles Verfilmung der »Carmina Burana« von Carl Orff, in: Thomas Rösch (ed.), Text, Musik, Szene ─ Das Musiktheater von Carl Orff, Mainz etc. (Schott) 2015, pp. 147–173.
- Kii-Ming Lo, »Im Dunkel du, im Lichte ich!« ─ Jean-Pierre Ponnelles Bayreuther Inszenierung von »Tristan und Isolde«, in: Naomi Matsumoto et al. (eds.), The Staging of Verdi & Wagner Operas, Turnhout (Brepols) 2015, pp. 307–321.
- Various authors (ed.), Ponnelle in München, 1952–1988, Exhibition catalogue of the Bavarian State Opera, München (Bayerische Staatsoper) 1991.
