= The Vivaldi Album =

Studio album by Cecilia Bartoli
- Released: 1999
- Label: Decca Classics

The Vivaldi Album is a 1999 recording of Vivaldi opera arias by Cecilia Bartoli with the period instrument ensemble Il Giardino Armonico released by Decca Classics. The album's commercial success marked a major leap in revival of interest in the operas of Antonio Vivaldi.
