= Zdzisława Donat =

Polish soprano

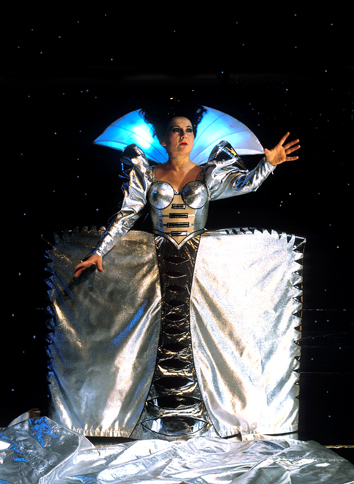
Zdzisława Donat as the Queen of Night.

Zdzisława Donat-Pajda (born 4 July 1936, in Poznań) is a Polish coloratura soprano. She studied in Warsaw and Siena, where she was a pupil of Gino Bechi.

In 1964, Donat debuted in Poznań, as Gilda in Rigoletto, and later appeared in many international opera houses, including those in Toulouse, Helsinki, Warsaw, Moscow, Munich, Buenos Aires, Milan (the Teatro alla Scala, where she sang in L'enfant et les sortilèges, 1975), Rome, Prague, Naples, Brussels, Vienna (from 1974 to 1979, in Lucia di Lammermoor and the Queen of Night in Die Zauberflöte), Salzburg, Berlin, Hamburg, London (the Queen of Night at Covent Garden, from 1979 to 1983), Paris, Verona ("Opera for Africa," 1985), Orange, and Japan.

Donat made her American debut in 1975, at the San Francisco Opera, as the Queen of Night, opposite Alan Titus and Dame Kiri Te Kanawa. In 1981, she debuted at the Metropolitan Opera in the same role. She returned in 1987, for Constanze in Die Entführung aus dem Serail, in John Dexter's production. In 1980, she recorded, for RCA, her Queen of Night, with Ileana Cotrubaș, Éric Tappy, Christian Boesch, José van Dam, and Martti Talvela, conducted by James Levine. In 1989, Donat appeared in a film version of Der Schauspieldirektor.

As of 2009, Zdzisława Donat-Pajda is Professor Emeritus at the Fryderyk Chopin University of Music.

== Videography ==
- Die Entführung aus dem Serail (Talvela; Bertini, G.Rennert, 1976) [live] Arthaus Musik
- "Die Zauberflöte für Kinder" (Cotrubaş, Sieber, Schreier, Boesch, Rydl; Levine, Ponnelle, 1982) [live] TDK
