= Edita Gruberová =

Slovak soprano (1946–2021)

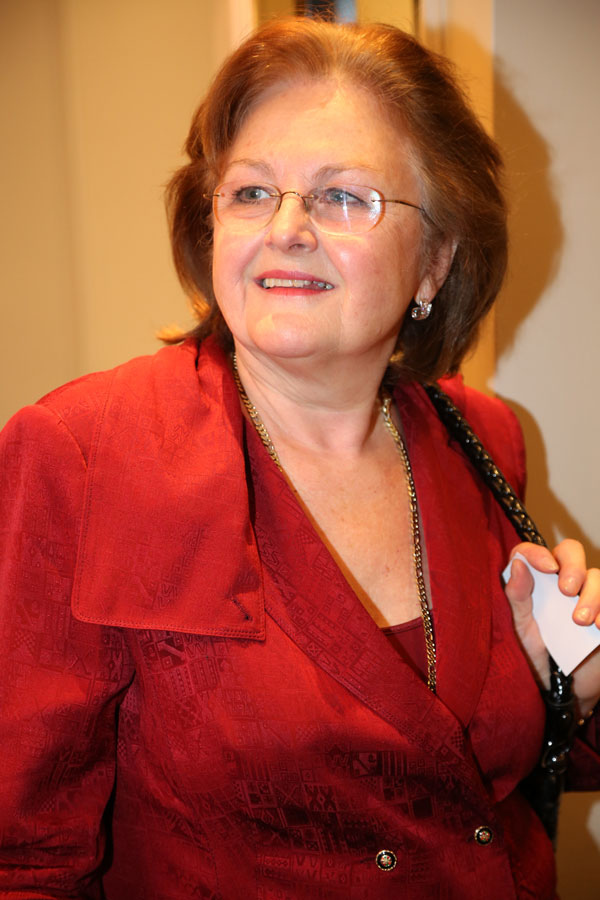
- Gruberová in 2013
- Born: 23 December 1946; Rača, Bratislava, Czechoslovakia
- Died: 18 October 2021 (aged 74); Zürich, Switzerland
- Occupation: Operatic soprano
- Years active: 1968–2020
- Organisation: Vienna State Opera
- Title: Kammersängerin
- Awards: Bayerischer Verdienstorden; Herbert von Karajan Music Prize; Österreichischer Musiktheaterpreis; International Classical Music Awards

Edita Gruberová (Slovak: [ˈedita ˈɡruberoʋaː]; 23 December 1946 – 18 October 2021) was a Slovak coloratura soprano. She made her stage debut in Bratislava in 1968 as Rosina in Rossini's Il barbiere di Siviglia, and successfully auditioned at the Vienna State Opera the following year, which became her base. She received international recognition for roles such as Mozart's Queen of the Night in Die Zauberflöte and Zerbinetta in Ariadne auf Naxos by Richard Strauss.

In her later career, she explored heavier roles in the Italian bel canto repertoire, such as the title role in Donizetti's Lucia di Lammermoor, and Elvira in Bellini's I puritani. In 2019, she portrayed Elisabetta in Donizetti's Roberto Devereux, who leaves her throne, concluding a stage career performing leading roles over 51 years. She is remembered as the "Slowakische Nachtigall" (Slovak Nightingale), and as prima donna assoluta.

== Early life and education ==
Edita Gruberová was born on 23 December 1946 in Rača, Bratislava, to a German father and a Hungarian mother. As an anti-communist, her father survived a five-year prison sentence for treason. Her father drank and she developed a close relationship with her mother. She sang in a school choir and in the children's choir of the broadcaster. The pastor of the parish where she prepared for Confirmation accompanied her when she sang solos at church, and prepared her in piano playing to pass the exam to enter the conservatory. Gruberová began her musical studies at the Bratislava Conservatory (Konzervatórium v Bratislave), where she was a student of Mária Medvecká. She then continued at the Academy of Performing Arts in Bratislava (VŠMU). While studying there, she was a singer of the Lúčnica folk ensemble and appeared several times in the Slovak National Theatre. She would later study with Ruthilde Boesch in Vienna.

== Career ==
=== Opera ===
In 1968, Gruberová made her operatic debut at the National Theatre in Bratislava as Rosina in Rossini's Il barbiere di Siviglia. After winning a singing competition in Toulouse, she was then engaged as a soloist of the opera ensemble of the J. G. Tajovský Theatre in Banská Bystrica, Slovakia, from 1968 to 1970. Among her roles was Eliza Doolittle in Loewe's musical My Fair Lady. Since communist Czechoslovakia was going through normalisation, during which the borders to non-communist countries were closed, Medvecká surreptitiously arranged for an audition for Gruberová at the Vienna State Opera in the summer of 1969. She was immediately engaged, and made her breakthrough the following year when she appeared as the Queen of the Night in Mozart's Die Zauberflöte. In 1971, Gruberová decided to emigrate to the West. She became a member of the Vienna State Opera in 1972, where she was only given secondary and supporting roles in her early years. She was invited to perform at many of the most important opera houses in the world, especially in coloratura roles. Gruberová made her debut at Glyndebourne in 1973 as the Queen of the Night. She became an Austrian citizen in 1974.

In Vienna, she studied with Ruthilde Boesch, whom she described as a wonderful, tough, diligent teacher, the demanding role of Zerbinetta in Ariadne auf Naxos by Richard Strauss. Although a guest was planned to sing the role in a new production in 1976, Gruberová convinced conductor Karl Böhm that she was capable. The premiere won her international recognition, and Böhm said he wished that the composer could have heard that performance. Gruberová first appeared at the Metropolitan Opera, New York City in 1977, again as the Queen of the Night, conducted by James Conlon. She appeared as Zerbinetta in a live broadcast conducted by James Levine in 1979. Robert Jacobson of Opera News, in his review noted:

New, and a brilliant addition to the ensemble, was Edita Gruberova as Zerbinetta, The Slovak soprano is everything one could hope for in this soaring, most demanding role, for she acts enchantingly, sings with great skill and musicality and possesses a voice that not only sails easily to the top, but is filled out with sweetness and quality; she had a triumph, predictably, not only in her big aria, but in the touching duet with the Composer in the prologue as well.

In 1977, she first appeared at the Salzburg Festival, as Thibault in Verdi's Don Carlo, conducted by Herbert von Karajan. In opera films, she performed as Gilda in Ponnelle's 1982 film adaptation of Rigoletto, alongside Ingvar Wixell in the title role and Luciano Pavarotti as the Duke, and in his 1988 film adaptation of Mozart's Così fan tutte, alongside Delores Ziegler and Ferruccio Furlanetto. Gruberová made her Royal Opera House debut as Giulietta in Bellini's I Capuleti e i Montecchi in 1984. Other important roles include the title roles of Verdi's La traviata, Donizetti's Lucia di Lammermoor, and Massenet's Manon. She performed as Konstanze in Mozart's Die Entführung aus dem Serail, and Oscar in Verdi's Un ballo in maschera.

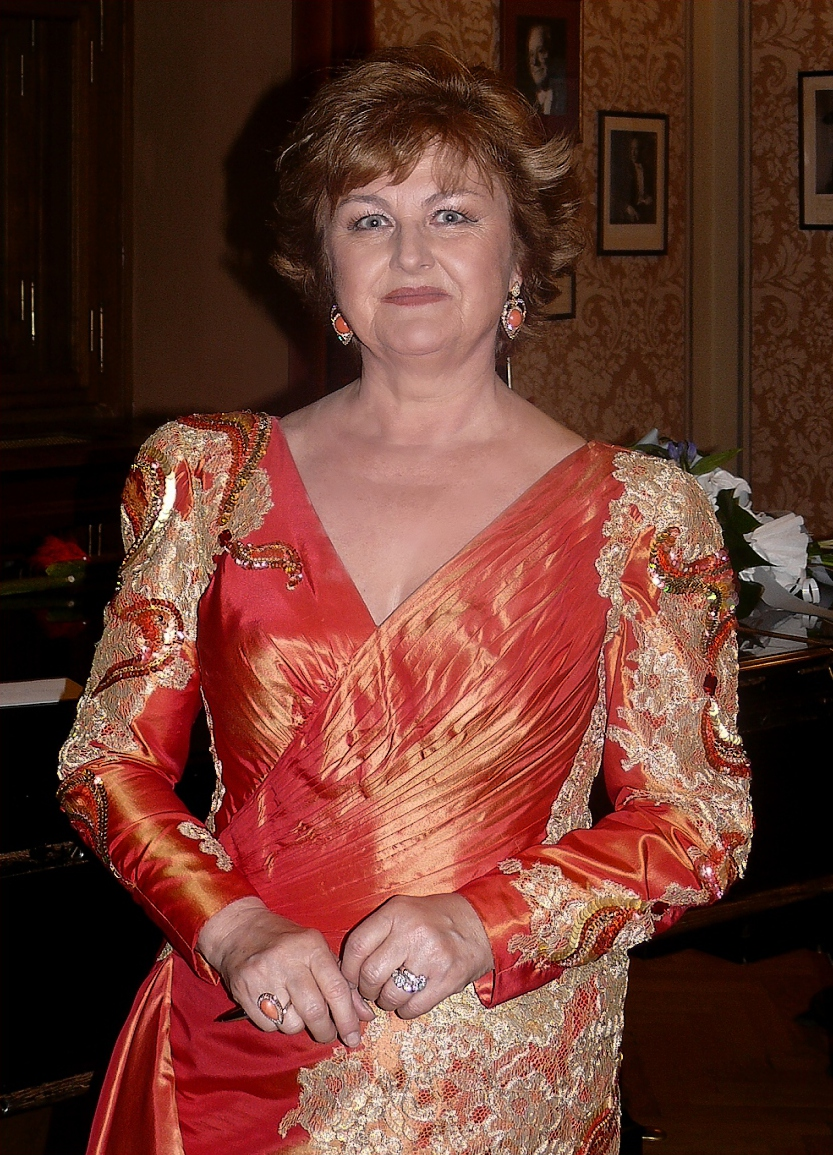
Gruberová in 2008

Gruberová appeared as a regular guest at the Zürich Opera, as Marie in Donizetti's La fille du régiment in 1984, as Lucia in 1990, and in the title role of Rossini's Semiramide in 1992. She performed there in the title role of Donizetti's Linda di Chamounix in 1995, as Elvira in Bellini's I puritani in 1999, in the title role of Donizetti's Anna Bolena in 2000, and in the title role of Bellini's Beatrice di Tenda in 2001. The same year, she withdrew from all her performances at the Zürich Opera, after Alexander Pereira, then intendant, claimed that her dancer daughter's injury, which forced her to quit dancing, was not an occupational accident. In 2012, she appeared there again in a recital, stepping in for Jonas Kaufmann. Later that year, after Pereira's departure, she performed with the company again, in a revival of Roberto Devereux.

Gruberová appeared as Donna Anna in Mozart's Don Giovanni at La Scala in Milan in 1987 and as Elisabetta in Donizetti's Roberto Devereux in Vienna in 1990. The latter became one of her signature roles; in a new production in Munich directed by Christof Loy, she made peace with Regietheater in a dramatic portrayal of the Queen, without losing her distinctive coloratura. She always performed coloratura ornamentation with dramatic expressiveness, with humour as Zerbinetta, and in rapture with a high trill as the dying Antonia in Offenbach's Les contes d'Hoffmann. In 2006, she added the title role in Bellini's Norma to her repertoire, at the Bavarian State Opera.

She gave her last opera performance on 27 March 2019 as Elisabetta in Roberto Devereux at the Bavarian State Opera. She concluded her stage career after 51 years of singing leading roles, and received ovations for 58 minutes. Jürgen Kesting, writing for the FAZ, allegorized her convincing portrayal of the aging Elizabeth I who leaves her throne and drew parallels to her retiring. She then focused on concerts and giving masterclasses. She officially retired from the stage in September 2020, in part due to delays related to the COVID-19 pandemic which made planning further performances difficult. Her last performance was in Gersthofen on 20 December 2019. Her two planned farewell performances in November 2020, in a semi-staged Roberto Devereux at the National Theatre Košice, were cancelled due to the pandemic.

=== Lied ===
Gruberová was introduced to Lieder repertoire by Harald Goertz, a professor at the Vienna Music Academy, and repetiteur at the Vienna State Opera. They often performed together, until Erik Werba became her Lied partner with whom she performed songs by Franz Schubert, Gustav Mahler and Strauss. In 1980, they performed a recital at the Salzburg Festival with clarinetist Peter Schmidl, featuring songs by Mendelssohn, Schubert and Strauss.

=== Recognition ===
Gruberová was an Austrian and Bavarian Kammersängerin, and an honorary member of the Vienna State Opera from 1988. She was known as the "Slowakische Nachtigall" (Slovak Nightingale). Kesting recognized Gruberová as the last prima donna assoluta.

== Personal life ==
Gruberová was married to Štefan Klimo, a Czech composer and musicologist. They divorced in 1983 and Klimo died by suicide soon afterwards. Beginning in the 1980s, she had a long professional and personal relationship with Friedrich Haider, a pianist and conductor. They separated in 2007. She is the mother of two daughters, including the dancer and choreographer Barbara Klimo. She moved her residence to Zürich in the mid-1980s for tax reasons.

Gruberová died of an accidental head injury in Zürich on 18 October 2021 at age 74. A black flag was flown by the Vienna State Opera as a sign of mourning.

== Recordings ==
Gruberová made many recordings, most notably in full-length opera, and extended selections from Donizetti's Tudor Queens' trilogy and other bel canto operas. She recorded Die Zauberflöte with conductors Alain Lombard, Bernard Haitink and Nikolaus Harnoncourt, Ariadne auf Naxos with Georg Solti, and Die Entführung aus dem Serail with Heinz Wallberg, among others. In her later years, she recorded exclusively on the Nightingale label that she founded. More than a dozen of her filmed and televised opera appearances have been released on DVD, including Die Zauberflöte, Così fan tutte, Die Entführung aus dem Serail, I puritani, Norma, Manon, Beatrice di Tenda, and Donizetti's Lucrezia Borgia and Linda di Chamounix, and Ariadne auf Naxos.

She recorded Bach's solo cantatas for soprano, such as Jauchzet Gott in allen Landen, BWV 51, and Mein Herze schwimmt im Blut, BWV 199, in 1979, with Helmut Winschermann conducting the Deutsche Bachsolisten and trumpeter Wolfgang Basch. She also appeared as the soprano soloist in Giuseppe Sinopoli's 1991 recording of Mahler's Fourth Symphony.

== Awards ==
- 1980: Austrian Kammersängerin
- 1988: Honorary member of the Vienna State Opera
- 1989: Bavarian Kammersängerin
- 1997: Bayerischer Verdienstorden
- 1999: Bavarian Maximilian Order for Science and Art (in the field of art)
- 2009: Ehrenzeichen für Verdienste um das Land Wien in Gold
- 2013: Herbert von Karajan Music Prize
- 2014: Österreichischer Musiktheaterpreis Goldener Schikaneder for her life's work
- 2016: Ehrenplakette of the Richard-Strauss-Festival in Garmisch-Partenkirchen
- 2021: International Classical Music Awards, Lifetime Achievement
