= Myra Merritt =

American operatic soprano

Myra Merritt (born January 12, 1949, Washington, DC) is an American operatic soprano. She earned a Bachelor of Music from the Peabody Conservatory of Music, and a Master of Music from the Catholic University of America.

She made her debut with the Metropolitan Opera in 1982, as the Shepherd in Tannhäuser, conducted by James Levine. She was to appear with that company many times through 1991, including appearances in L'enfant et les sortilèges (as the Fire, directed by John Dexter), the Centennial Gala (the duet from Don Giovanni), La bohème (as Musetta, opposite Plácido Domingo), Les contes d'Hoffmann (as Antonia, conducted by Julius Rudel), Porgy and Bess (as Clara), L'italiana in Algeri (as Elvira) and Don Giovanni (as Zerlina). Elsewhere, she has sung under Sarah Caldwell and Mstislav Rostropovich.

Merritt has performed in many capitals and cities throughout Europe and the United States. In 2007, Deutsche Grammophon issued a DVD of her 1986 Met performance of L'italiana in Algeri, with Marilyn Horne, and Levine conducting Jean-Pierre Ponnelle's production.

Currently, the soprano is Professor of Voice at Bowling Green State University, in Ohio.
