= Kii-Ming Lo =

Taiwanese musicologist

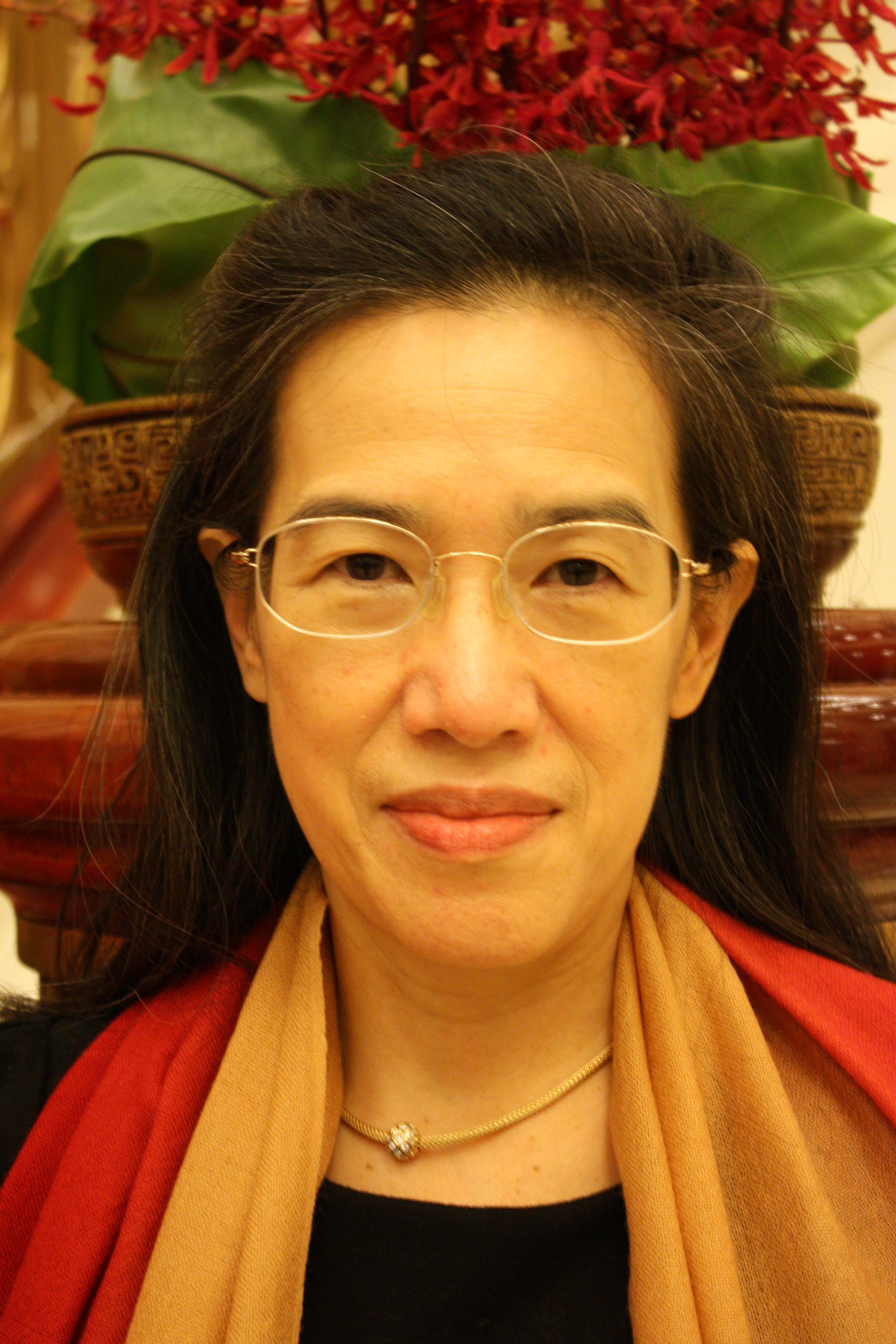
Kii-Ming Lo, Taipei, National Concert Hall, Chiang-Kai-Shek Cultural Center, Taipei / Taiwan, R.O.C. (2013)

Kii-Ming Lo (Chinese: 羅基敏; pinyin: Luójīmǐn), born November 4, 1954, in Keelung, is a Taiwanese musicologist.

== Life ==
Kii-Ming Lo was born on November 4, 1954, in Keelung, Taiwan. After initial studies of textile technology at Fu Jen Catholic University (Taipei), which she completed with a bachelor's degree, she went to Germany in order to study musicology. From 1980 to 1988 she studied musicology (Ludwig Finscher, Herbert Schneider), sinology (Günther Debon) and ethnology (Georg Pfeffer) at Heidelberg University. She received her doctorate in 1989 under the supervision of Ludwig Finscher with the dissertation »Turandot« auf der Opernbühne (Turandot on the opera stage), which since then has become a reference book on the subject [Frankfurt / Bern (Peter Lang) 1996]. From 1989 to 2002 she taught as professor of musicology at Fu-Jen Catholic University / Taipei; in 1999 she was made "full professor of musicology". From 2002 until her retirement in 2020, she taught as professor of musicology at the Music Department of the National Taiwan Normal University (NTNU) in Taipei.

== Musicology ==
Kii-Ming Lo’s research and teaching activities at NTNU brought about a gradual professionalization of the discipline of musicology in Taiwan under the influence of the German musicological tradition. For more than a decade after her appointment as professor, she remained the only musicologist from Taiwan who actively participated in the congresses of the International Musicological Society (IMS). Since 1999 Kii-Ming Lo has organized several international musicological symposia, often in collaboration with the Taipei Symphony Orchestra (TSO) and the National Symphony Orchestra (NSO) in Taipei. Especially the international congresses on Giacomo Puccini (2008) and Richard Wagner (2013) have met with universal acclaim. Her numerous publications include several monographs in Chinese, including a biography of the Taiwanese composer Pan Hwang-Long, and several scholarly articles in Taiwanese musicological journals. Kii-Ming Lo has published numerous articles in German, English and Italian in congress reports and specialist journals. Together with her husband, the musicologist Jürgen Maehder, she has published a series of Chinese monographs on the history of opera). Her areas of research include the opera history of the 19th and 20th centuries in Europe, especially the "Turandot" operas by Giacomo Puccini and Ferruccio Busoni, the interrelation between music and literature, especially the history of the opera libretto in Germany with special attention to the 20th century German »Literaturoper« (an opera based on a pre-existing literary text, therefore without the intervention of a librettist), the history of opera film with a special focus on Jean-Pierre Ponnelle, the interrelation between Asia and Europe in the European music theater and contemporary music in Taiwan.

== Publications ==
=== Books ===
- 1996 »Turandot« auf der Opernbühne, Frankfurt/Bern/New York (Peter Lang), ISBN 3-631-42578-3.
- 1998 Puccini’s »Turandot« – Tong hua, xi ju, ge ju, Taipei (Gao Tan Publishing Co.) 1998 (in collaboration with Jürgen Maehder), ISBN 957-98196-1-0.
- 1998 Feminine Spirituality in Theatre, Opera and Dance, Taipei (Fu-Jen University, College of Foreign Languages) 1998 (in collaboration with Lin-Shui Fu, Chi-Hui Liu and Lynda Scott), ISBN 957-9000-53-0.
- 1999 Wen hua yin yue: Yin yue yu wen xue zhi wen hua chang yu [= Musical culture: Cultural Dimensions of Music and Literature], Taipei (Gao Tan Publishing Co.) 1999, ISBN 957-98066-4-0.
- 2000 Tan yin lun yue. Yin yue yan chu yu yin yue yan jiu [= Performing Music – Understanding Music. Musicianship and Musicological Research], Taipei (Gao Tan Publishing Co.) 2000, ISBN 957-04430-1-4.
- 2003 Puccini's »Turandot«, Guilin (Guanxi Normal University Press) 2003 (in collaboration with Jürgen Maehder), ISBN 7-5633-3807-1.
- 2003 Ai zhi si – Wagner's »Tristan und Isolde« [Liebestod ─ »Tristan und Isolde« by Richard Wagner], Taipei (Gao Tan Publishing Co.) 2003 (in collaboration with Jürgen Maehder), ISBN 957-0443-79-0.
- 2003 Wen hua yin yue: Yin yue yu wen xue zhi wen hua chang yu [= Music culture: Cultural Dimensions of Music and Literature], Guilin (Guanxi Normal University Press) 2003, ISBN 7-5633-3808-X.
- 2003 Tan yin lun yue. Yin yue yan chu yu yin yue yan jiu [= Performing Music – Understanding Music. Musicianship and Musicological Research], Guilin (Guanxi Normal University Press) 2003, ISBN 7-5633-3809-8.
- 2004 Turandot de tui bian [The Transformations of »Turandot«], Taipei (Gao Tan Publishing Co.) 2004 (in collaboration with Jürgen Maehder), ISBN 986-7542-50-9.
- 2005 Gu jin xiang sheng yin yue meng: Shu xie Pan Hwang-Long [= A Musical Dream from Tradition and Contemporaneity: The composer Pan Hwang-Long, Taipei (China Times) 2005, ISBN 957-13-4281-5.
- 2006 »Duo mei a! Jin wan de gong zhu!« – Li cha shi te lao si de »Sha le mei« [»Wie schön ist die Prinzessin heute nacht!« – »Salome« by Richard Strauss], Taipei (Gao Tan Publishing Co.) 2006 (in collaboration with Jürgen Maehder), ISBN 986-7101-16-2.
- 2006 Hua ge na – Zhi huan – Bai lu te, [Wagner – »Der Ring des Nibelungen« – Bayreuth], Taipei (Gao Tan Publishing Co.) 2006 (in collaboration with Jürgen Maehder), ISBN 978-986-7101-33-4.
- 2010 Shao nian mo hao ─ Ma le de shi yi chuan yuan [= »Des Knaben Wunderhorn« ─ Gustav Mahler's poetic source], Taipei (Gao Tan Publishing Co.) 2010 (in collaboration with Jürgen Maehder), ISBN 978-986-6271-17-5.
- 2011 »Da di zhi ge« ─ Ma le de ren shi xin shen [= »Das Lied von der Erde« ─ The Synthesis of Gustav Mahler’s World Views], Taipei (Gao Tan Publishing Co.) 2011 (in collaboration with Jürgen Maehder), ISBN 978-986-6620-44-7.
- 2014 Ai zhi si ─ Wagner's »Tristan und Isolde« [Liebestod ─ »Tristan und Isolde« by Richard Wagner], Taipei (Gao Tan Publishing Co.) 2014 (in collaboration with Jürgen Maehder), ISBN 978-986-6620-50-8.
- 2014 Zou yi ge shi ji de ying yue lu: Liao Nian-Fu zhuan [= The musikal Path of a Century: A Biography of Liao Nian-Fu], Taipei (Gao Tan Publishing Co.) 2014, ISBN 978-986-5767-44-0.
- 2017 Hua ge na yen jiou: Shen hua, Shi wen, Yue pu, Wu tai [Richard Wagner: Myth, Poem, Score, Stage], Taipei (Gao Tan Publishing Co.) 2017 (in collaboration with Jürgen Maehder), ISBN 978-986-94383-4-6.

=== Scholarly articles in English ===
- 1991 In Search for a Chinese Melody — Tracing the Source of Weber's »Musik zu Turandot«, op. 37, in: Tradition and its Future in Music. Report of SIMS 1990 Osaka, edd. Tokumaru Yosihiko, Ohmiya Makoto, Kanazawa Masakata, Yamaguti Osamu, Tukitani Tuneko, Takamatsu Akiko & Shimosako Mari, Tokyo/Osaka (Mita Press) 1991, 511–521.
- 1993 New Documents on the Encounter of European and Chinese Music, in: Report of IMS 1992 Madrid, published as Separata de la Revista de Musicología, Volumen 16, 1993, No 4, pp. 1896-1911.
- 1997 Giacomo Puccini’s »Turandot« in two Acts — The Draft of the first Version of the Libretto, in: Giacomo Puccini. L’uomo, il musicista, il panorama europeo. Proceedings of the International Congress, Lucca 25–29 November 1994, ed. by Gabriella Biagi Ravenni & Carolyn Gianturo. (Studi Musicali Toscani, 4), Lucca (LIM) 1997, 239–258.
- 1999 Some Functions of Music in Chinese Classical Literature, in: Walter Bernhart, Steven Paul Scher, Werner Wolf (eds.), Word and Music Studies: Defining the Field. Proceedings of the First International Conference on Word and Music Studies at Graz, 1997, Amsterdam (Rodopi) 1999, 221- 235.
- 2007 Elements of East Asian Music as Exoticism in Twentieth-Century European Opera: The Case of Isang Yun, in: Paolo Amalfitano & Loretta Innocenti (edd.), L'Oriente. Storia di una figura nelle arti occidentali (1700 2000), 2 vols., Roma (Bulzoni) 2007, vol. 2, 487–500.
- 2019 Staging Wagner after Chereau: The Search for Continuous Innovation at Bayreuth Festival, 1986–1993, in: Marco Brighenti/Marco Targa (edd.), Mettere in scena Wagner. Opera e regia fra Ottocento e contemporaneità, Lucca (LIM) 2019, 175–188.
