= John Alexander (tenor) =

American operatic singer

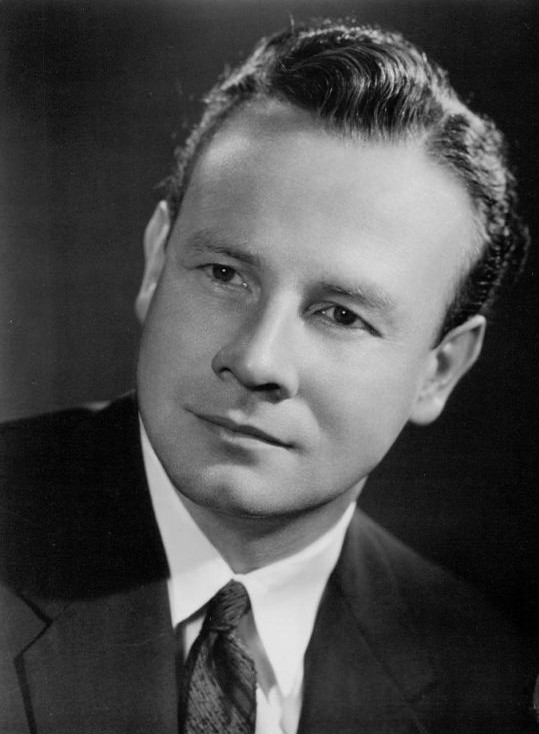
- Alexander in 1960
- Born: October 21, 1923; Meridian, Mississippi, U.S.
- Died: December 8, 1990 (aged 67); Meridian, Mississippi, U.S.
- Education: University of Cincinnati College-Conservatory of Music (BM)
- Occupation: Operatic tenor
- Years active: 1951–1990

John Alexander (October 21, 1923 – December 8, 1990) was an American operatic tenor who had a substantial career during the 1950s through the 1980s. He had a longstanding relationship with the Metropolitan Opera in New York City, singing with that company every year between 1961 and 1987 for a total of 379 performances. He also periodically performed at the New York City Opera during his career and was a frequent presence at the Philadelphia Lyric Opera Company during the late 1950s and 1960s. Although he spent most of his career in New York City, Alexander occasionally traveled to perform as a guest artist with many of the world's leading opera houses, both in the United States and Europe. He was also an active concert singer throughout his career.

While most of Alexander's career was spent in lyric roles from the Italian and French repertory, he had enough heft in his voice to successfully tackle some of the lighter Heldentenor roles of Richard Wagner and Richard Strauss. Aside from a handful of these roles, however, his repertoire at the Metropolitan did not include heavier parts. Rather, he was known there for an expansive lyric repertoire that encompassed the works of Mozart, Puccini, Verdi, and Donizetti among others. His signature roles included Alfredo in La traviata, Arbace in Idomeneo, Belmonte in Die Entführung aus dem Serail, the Duke of Mantua in Rigoletto, Edgardo from Lucia di Lammermoor, Ferrando in Così fan tutte, Hoffman in Les contes d'Hoffmann, Lieutenant B. F. Pinkerton in Madama Butterfly, Rodolfo in La bohème, and the title roles in Don Carlos and Faust.

== Early life and career ==
Alexander was born and raised in Meridian, Mississippi. He attended the University of Cincinnati College-Conservatory of Music, earning a Bachelor of Music in Vocal Performance. Many years later, while still working regularly for the Metropolitan Opera, he returned to the conservatory as a member of the voice faculty.

In 1951 Alexander moved to New York City to begin studying voice further under Robert Weede and with the intent of pursuing a performance career. That same year he auditioned for and was accepted as a member of the Charles Wagner Opera Company, a touring company which traveled throughout North America. He traveled widely with the company during the Fall of 1951, notably portraying Alfredo in Giuseppe Verdi's La traviata opposite a young Beverly Sills as Violetta. In the spring of 1952 he made his first appearance with at an actual opera house as the title hero in Charles Gounod's Faust with Cincinnati Opera. The following fall he once again traveled with the Charles Wagner Opera Company, this time singing Don José in Bizet's Carmen opposite Sill's Micaëla. Over the next five years he appeared in several houses throughout the United States including the Baltimore Opera Company and the Houston Grand Opera.

In 1957 Alexander made his debut with the Philadelphia Grand Opera Company as Lieutenant Pinkerton in Puccini's Madama Butterfly opposite Dorothy Kirsten as Cio-Cio San. That same year he made his first appearance with the New York City Opera singing the role of Alfredo. The following year he returned to the New York City Opera to portray the role of Henry Morosus for the United States premiere of Richard Strauss's Die schweigsame Frau. He continued to perform periodically at the New York City Opera up through the 1970s, notably excelling as Walther in Wagner's Die Meistersinger and as Bacchus in Richard Strauss's Ariadne auf Naxos. In 1958 he created the role of Lucentio is the first staged performance of Vittorio Giannini's The Taming of the Shrew.

On February 10, 1958, Alexander portrayed the role of Rodolfo opposite Elaine Malbin's Mimì in Giacomo Puccini's La bohème for the very first opera performance given by the Philadelphia Lyric Opera Company. He returned several more times for performances with that company, including portrayals of Vicomte Camille de Jolidon in Die lustige Witwe (1958), Lieutenant Pinkerton (1959, 1962, 1963), Sir Edgardo di Ravenswood in Lucia di Lammermoor (1960, 1961), Ferrando in Così fan tutte (1960), Alfredo (1961, 1963, 1972), Faust (1967), Gennaro in Lucrezia Borgia (1969), and Roberto, conte di Leicester in Maria Stuarda (1974).

== Later life and career ==
In 1961 Alexander joined the roster of the Metropolitan Opera where he sang regularly for the next 26 years. He made his first appearance on the Met stage as Ferrando in Così fan tutte on December 19, 1961, with Teresa Stich-Randall as Fiordiligi, Rosalind Elias as Dorabella, Theodor Uppman as Guglielmo, Roberta Peters as Despina, and Frank Guarrera as Don Alfonso. His other roles at the Met included Alfredo, Anatol in Barber's Vanessa, Arbace, Belmonte, Don Carlos, Cassio in Otello, Cavaradossi in Tosca, Des Grieux in Manon, Des Grieux in Manon Lescaut, the Duke of Mantua, Edgardo, Eisenstein in Die Fledermaus, Elvino in La Sonnambula, Faust, Goffredo in Rinaldo, Grigory in Boris Godunov, Fernando in La favorita, Hoffmann, the Italian Singer in Der Rosenkavalier, Kodanda in Menotti's The Last Savage, Lensky in Eugene Onegin, Lionel in Martha, the title role in Lohengrin, Maurizio in Adriana Lecouvreur, Narraboth in Strauss's Salome, Pinkerton, Pollione in Norma, Riccardo in Un ballo in maschera, Rodolfo in La bohème, Rodolfo in Luisa Miller, Roland in Esclarmonde, Tamino in The Magic Flute, Tito in La clemenza di Tito, Tonio in La Fille du Régiment, and Walther von Stolzing in Die Meistersinger von Nürnberg among others.

During his long and distinguished career at the Met, Alexander sang opposite many famous artists, including the Met debuts of Renata Scotto (Pinkerton to her Butterfly), Montserrat Caballé (Faust to her Marguerite) and, in the same night as Caballé, Sherrill Milnes' (who portrayed Valentin). His last performance at the Met was on October 5, 1987, portraying Bacchus opposite Jessye Norman's Ariadne in Ariadne auf Naxos.

Although Alexander worked mostly in New York City he did occasionally travel to perform in other opera houses. In 1967 he made his debut with the San Francisco Opera as Julien in Gustave Charpentier's Louise. He returned to that company a few more times during his career, singing Rodolfo (1969), Pollione (1972), and Hoffmann (1987). Also in 1967, Alexander sang the role of Paul in Korngold's Die tote Stadt for his first performance with the Vienna Volksoper. The following year he sang the role of Rodolfo in La bohème at the Vienna State Opera. In 1970 he made his Royal Opera House at Covent Garden debut as Pollione and in 1973 he sang for the first time with the Opera Company of Boston as the title role in Verdi's Don Carlos. In 1975 he made his first appearance with the Opera Company of Philadelphia as Calaf in Turandot opposite Elinor Ross in the title role. He appeared as Pollione with the Portland Opera in 1978. He also performed in a few roles with the Berlin State Opera, the Bavarian State Opera, and the Cincinnati Opera.

Alexander sang relatively few performances outside of New York City, a conscious choice on his part. He chose to not travel in favor of having a stable life with his wife Sue and their daughter, Cindy. The family made their home on Long Island during the late 1950s through the early 1970s. At this point, Alexander joined the voice faculty at his alma mater in Cincinnati, Ohio. The family then relocated to Cincinnati while maintaining an apartment on the West Side of Manhattan for Alexander to use when he was in town for rehearsals and performances at the Met.

In 1990 Alexander died suddenly of a heart attack at the Temple Theater in Meridian, Mississippi, the city where he was born. He was 67 years of age, and still actively performing and teaching at the time of his death.

== Recordings ==
Alexander may be seen on such videos as Mozart's Idomeneo (also starring Luciano Pavarotti, in Jean-Pierre Ponnelle's production, 1982) and Donizetti's Roberto Devereux (with Beverly Sills and Susanne Marsee, in Tito Capobianco's production, 1975). His discography includes recordings of Bellini's Norma (with Dame Joan Sutherland and Marilyn Horne, 1964) and Donizetti's Anna Bolena (opposite Elena Souliotis, 1968–69). Additionally, VAI has released his 1967 performance, in New Orleans, of Massenet's Manon, with Caballé and Louis Quilico.

== Videography ==
- Mozart, W. A.: Idomeneo, with Hildegard Behrens, Ileana Cotrubas, Luciano Pavarotti, Frederica von Stade and the Chorus and Orchestra of the Metropolitan Opera, conducted by James Levine, Deutsche Grammophon DVD, 00440-073-4234, 2006
