= Ruthilde Boesch =

Austrian opera singer

- Born: Ruthilde Klösterer; 9 January 1918; Braunau am Inn, Austria
- Died: 20 January 2012 (aged 94); Vienna, Austria
- Education: Wiener Musikakademie
- Occupation: Operatic soprano
- Organizations: Vienna State Opera
- Awards: Kammersängerin; Austrian Decoration for Science and Art

Ruthilde Boesch, born Ruthilde Klösterer, married also Ruthilde Loibner (9 January 1918 – 20 January 2012) was an Austrian soprano in opera, operetta, song and concert, and a vocal pedagogue. She was a member of the Vienna State Opera for decades, and later an influential voice teacher.

== Life and career ==
Born in Braunau am Inn, Klösterer grew up in Mödling. After her school years she studied singing at the Wiener Musikakademie with Fritzi Lahr-Goldschmied, Alfred Jerger and Judith Hellwig, among others. She studied further with Helene Wildbrunn at the Meisterklasse of the Akademie from 1936 to 1938, and an intensive role study with the Mozart conductor Josef Krips.

From 1945 to 1971 the soprano's "main importance was to be found in the field of coloratura soubrette". She was a member of the Vienna State Opera from 1947, where she made her debut as Susanna in Le nozze di Figaro. She took part in 387 performances in 38 different roles, appearing in more Mozart roles, such as Papagena in Die Zauberflöte, Blondchen in Die Entführung aus dem Serail, Despina in Così fan tutte, among other. She also appeared as Chloe in Pique Dame, Olympia in Offenbach's Les contes d'Hoffmann, Zerbinetta in Ariadne auf Naxos by Richard Strauss, and Luciete in I quatro rusteghi, among others. In 1949 she sang the Second Boy in Die Zauberflöte at the Salzburg Festival under Wilhelm Furtwängler, and the same year Blondchen at the Bregenz Festival.

Boesch appeared on many stages of the world. Numerous concerts and guest performances took her to Europe, the U.S., the Middle East, Australia, South and North America. She made five world tours of recitals with her second husband, the State Opera conductor Wilhelm Loibner, who was her accompanist. In 1968, she was awarded the title Kammersängerin.

After her retirement from the stage in 1974, she lived for a while in Japan. She devoted herself to teaching. Her pupils included Edita Gruberová, Eva Lind, Genia Kühmeier, her son Christian Boesch and her grandson Florian Boesch.

From her first marriage to A. E. Boesch, Ruthilde Boesch had two sons, Wolfgang Boesch (born 1939), a writer, and Christian Boesch who became a singer.

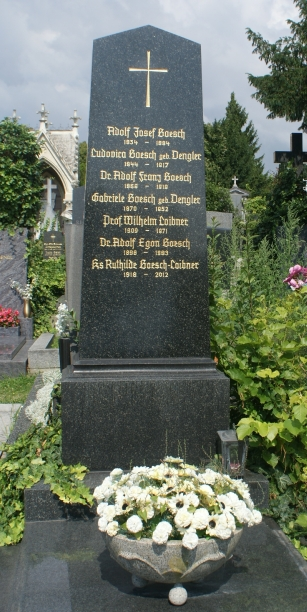
Grave of Ruthilde Boesch

She died in Vienna and is buried at the Grinzinger Friedhof (group 6, row 4, no. 4) in Döbling.

== Awards ==
- Austrian Kammersängerin (1968)
- Ehrenring of the Vienna State Opera
- Austrian Decoration for Science and Art in Silver

== Recordings ==
Her recordings are held by the German National Library, including:

- Die Zauberflöte
- Der Ring des Polykrates
- Rusalka
- Eine Nacht in Venedig
- Die Fledermaus
- Echo eines Sangeslebens (CD for her 80th birthday)
