= Cecilia Bartoli =

Italian opera singer (born 1966)

Cecilia Bartoli OMRI
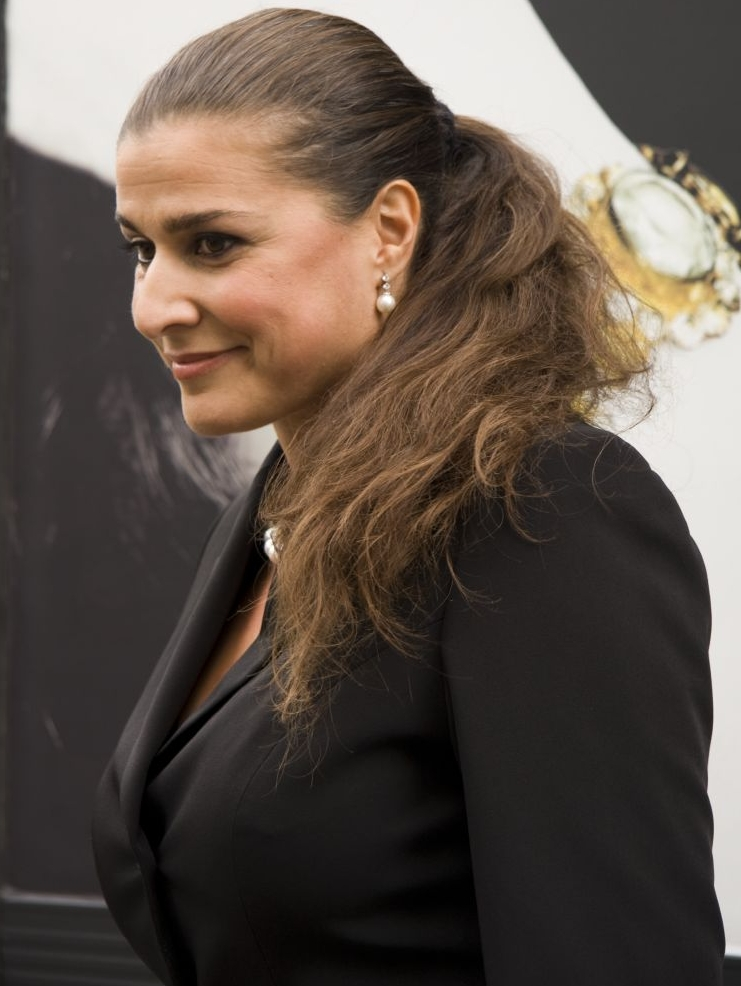
- Bartoli at the Centre for Fine Arts, Brussels in 2007
- Born: 4 June 1966 (age 60); Rome, Italy
- Education: Conservatorio Santa Cecilia
- Occupations: Opera singer; recitalist; arts administrator
- Years active: 1987–present
- Title: Artistic Director of Salzburg Whitsun Festival (since 2012); Director of the Opéra de Monte-Carlo (since 2023)
- Spouse: Oliver Widmer (m. 2011)
- Awards: Order of Merit of the Italian Republic; Léonie Sonning Music Prize; Handel Music Prize; Herbert von Karajan Music Prize; Polar Music Prize
- Website: www.ceciliabartoli.com

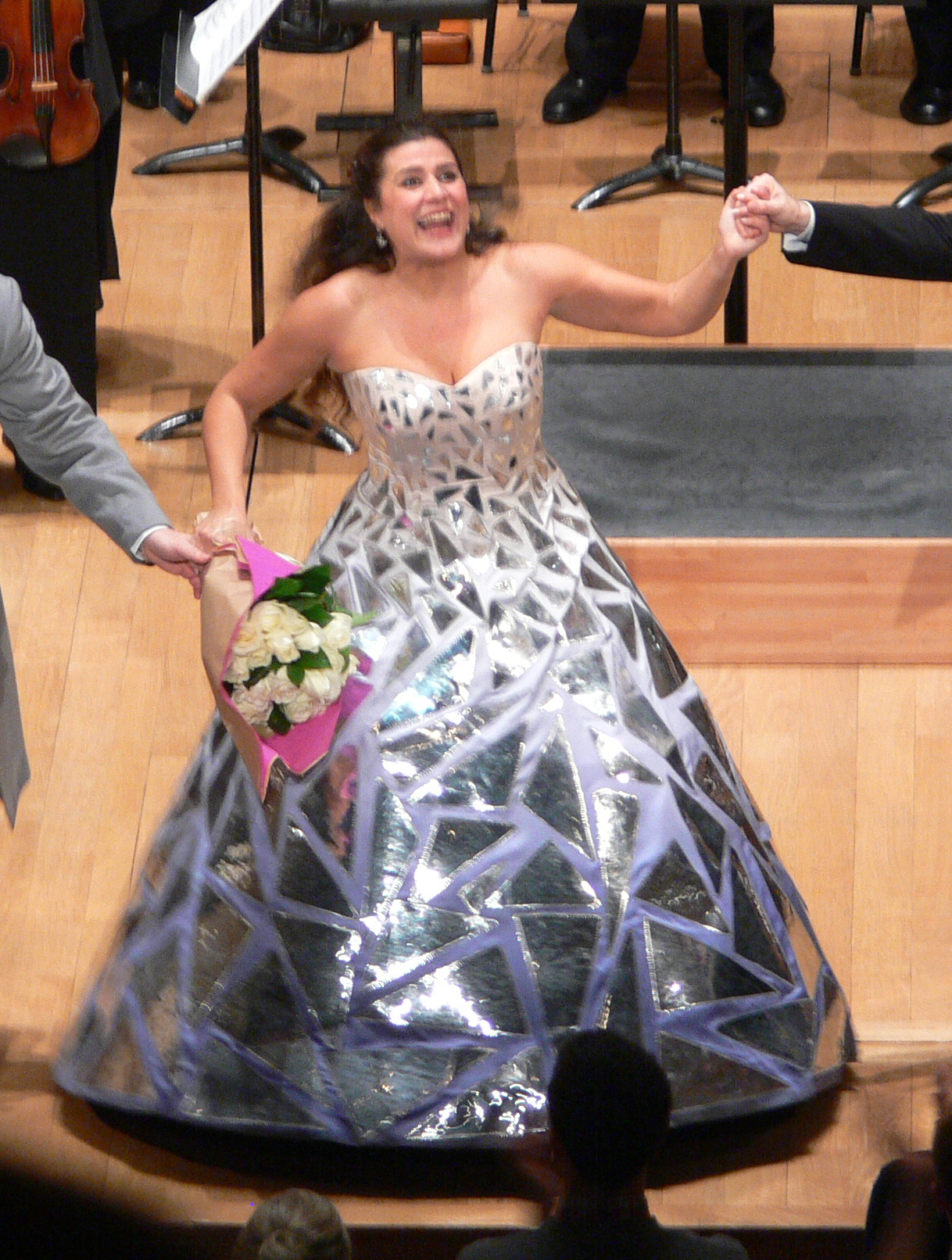
Bartoli after a concert performance of La Cenerentola at the Salle Pleyel, 2008

Cecilia Bartoli OMRI (Italian: [tʃeˈtʃiːlja ˈbartoli]; born 4 June 1966) is an Italian mezzo-soprano, widely known for her renditions of the music of Bellini, Handel, Mozart, Rossini, and Vivaldi, as well as lesser-known music of the Baroque and Classical periods. She has also sung soprano and alto repertory.

Bartoli is considered a singer with an unusual timbre. According to Nicholas Wroe in 2001, her voice was known for its "fully developed sumptuousness of the lower register, the vibrancy of the middle range...the top was limpid and powerful." She has been one of the most popular opera stars of recent years.

== Early life ==
Bartoli was born in Rome. Her parents, Silvana Bazzoni and Pietro Angelo Bartoli, were professional singers and her first music teachers. Cecilia first performed publicly at age nine as the shepherd boy in Tosca. She later studied at the Conservatorio di Santa Cecilia in Rome. At 19, she made her singing debut on the Italian TV variety show Fantastico. She did not win the show's competition, but was asked to sing with Paris Opera for a concert in homage to Maria Callas.

== Performing career ==
Bartoli made her professional opera debut in 1987 at the Arena di Verona. The following year, she undertook the role of Rosina in Rossini's The Barber of Seville at the Cologne Opera, the Schwetzingen Festival, and the Zurich Opera, earning rave reviews. Working with conductors Daniel Barenboim and Nikolaus Harnoncourt, Bartoli focused on Mozart roles, such as Zerlina in Don Giovanni and Dorabella in Così fan tutte, and, from then on, her career developed internationally.

In 1990, she made her debut at the Opéra Bastille as Cherubino in Mozart's The Marriage of Figaro, and her debut at the Hamburg State Opera as Idamantes in Mozart's Idomeneo, followed, in 1991, by her La Scala debut as Isolier in Le comte Ory a performance that solidified her reputation as one of the world's leading Rossini singers.

In 1996, Bartoli debuted at the Metropolitan Opera as Despina in Così fan tutte and returned in 1997 to sing the title role of La Cenerentola and, in 1998, as Susanna in The Marriage of Figaro. In 2000, she sang in another Mozart soprano role, Donna Elvira in Don Giovanni, at the Deutsche Oper Berlin. In 2001, she made her long-awaited Royal Opera House debut, in the roles of Euridice and the Genio in the London stage premiere of Haydn's L'anima del filosofo.

She is a foreign member of the Royal Swedish Academy of Music.

=== Work in Baroque music ===
External videos
- "Agitata da due venti", aria from Griselda by Antonio Vivaldi on YouTube

In addition to her focus on Mozart and Rossini, Bartoli has also spent much of her career performing and recording Baroque and early Classical era music by such composers as Gluck, Vivaldi, Haydn, and Salieri. In early 2005, she sang Cleopatra in Handel's Giulio Cesare. She often performs with the Baroque ensemble Il Giardino Armonico. (Note: One may find examples of Bartoli’s performances here: Jean-Melchior Delpias (2 June 2012). Ombra Mai Fu Cécilia Bartoli – via YouTube.; Woltomckaft Smith (28 December 2009). Cecilia Bartoli – Son qual nave – via YouTube.)

In 2012, Bartoli produced Mission, which premiered the works of Agostino Steffani, a lesser-known Baroque composer. She also produced a CD of his works, as well as an extended performance video that portrays her as the priest-composer Agostino in the Palace of Versailles. The video is known for its historic and visual accuracy of the Baroque period, conveyed through her performance, as well as the setting, wardrobe, and cinematography."

She performed the Olympic Hymn at the 2026 Winter Olympics opening ceremony, held in Milan's San Siro stadium.

=== Work in bel canto ===
In 2007/08, Bartoli studied and recorded the early 19th-century repertoire–the era of Italian Romanticism and bel canto. She especially focused on the work of the legendary singer Maria Malibran, the 200th anniversary of whose birth was celebrated in March 2008. The album Maria was released in September 2007. In May 2008, Bartoli sang the title role, written for Malibran, in a revival of Fromental Halévy's 1828 opera Clari at the Zurich Opera. In June 2010, she sang the title role of Bellini's Norma for the first time with conductor Thomas Hengelbrock in a concert at the Konzerthaus Dortmund. In March 2011, she toured five Australian cities with two programs drawn from Sacrificium and Maria.

== Administration career ==
=== Salzburg Whitsun Festival ===
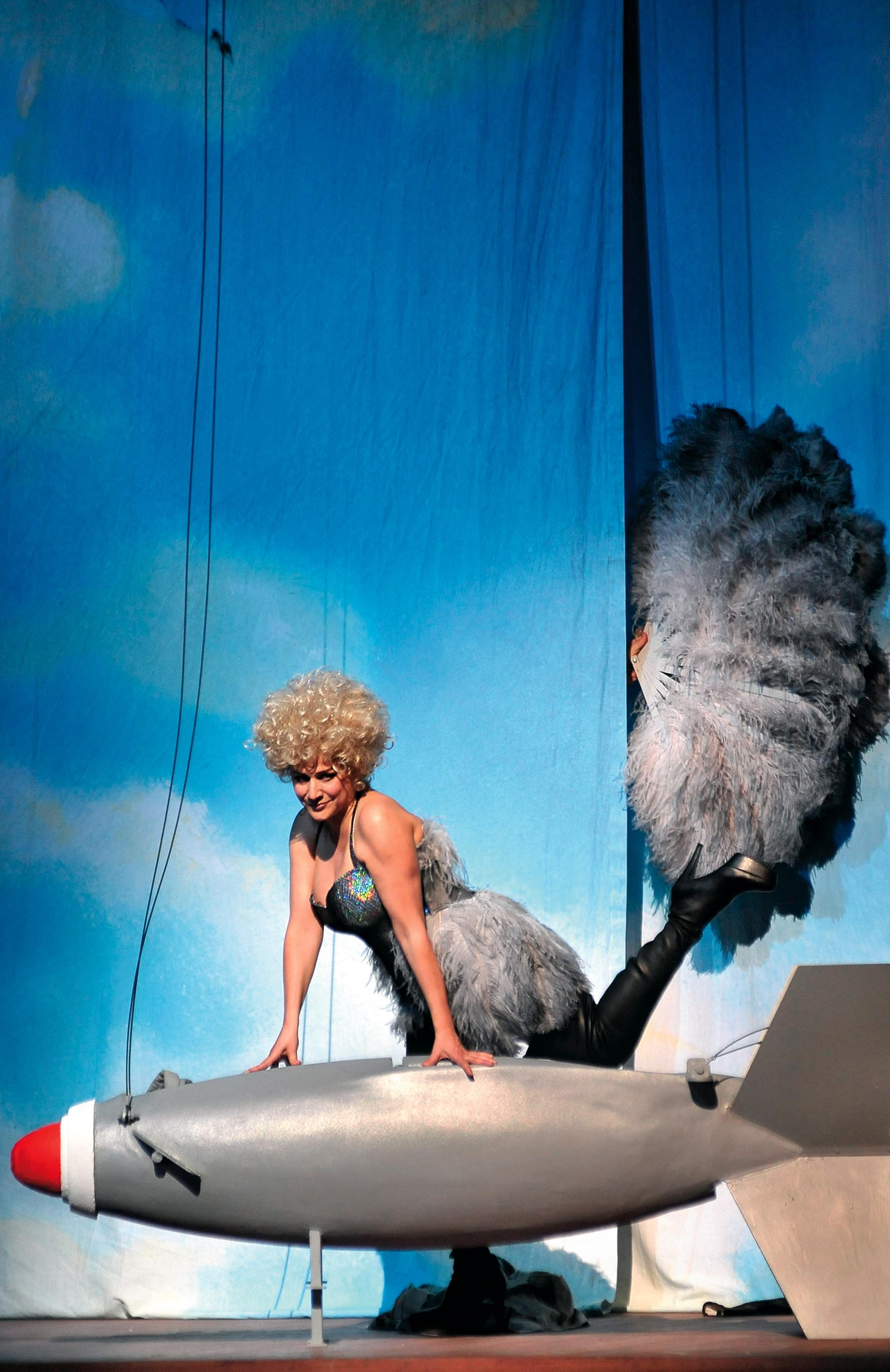
Bartoli as Cleopatra at the Salzburg Festival, 2012

In 2012, Bartoli became the artistic director of the Salzburg Whitsun Festival, an extension of the traditional Salzburg Festival, which produces performances during Whitsun (Pentecost) weekend. Forgoing the academic programming of her predecessors, she reformulated the festival's programming—returning to "the old recipe of organizing beautiful programs and inviting great artists"—resulting in record ticket sales and placing the festival on the international opera calendar. In 2012, she sang Cleopatra in Handel's Giulio Cesare, in 2013 the title role in Vincenzo Bellini's Norma, and in 2014 Rossini's La Cenerentola.

=== Opéra de Monte-Carlo ===
In December 2019, it was announced that Bartoli would succeed Jean-Louis Grinda as the director of the Opéra de Monte-Carlo, effective on 1 January 2023. She became the first woman to hold the position.

== Personal life ==
Bartoli lives with her husband, the Swiss bass-baritone Oliver Widmer, in Zollikon on the north shore of Lake Zurich, Switzerland, and in Rome part of the year. The couple married in 2011 after twelve years together. Bartoli lived in Monaco in the early 2010s.

== Awards and honours ==
Bartoli was appointed Chevalier of the French Ordre des Arts et des Lettres (1995), and Commander of Monaco's Order of Cultural Merit (November 1999).

In 2003, she received the Brit Award for Outstanding Contribution to Music at the Classic Brit Awards.

In 2010, she was awarded the Honorary Degree of Doctor of Music from University College Dublin.

In 2011, she won a fifth Grammy Award for Best Classical Vocal Performance for Sacrificium. In 2012, she was voted into the magazine's Gramophone's Hall of Fame. She is the 2012 recipient of the Herbert von Karajan Music Prize.

== Discography ==
=== Opera ===
- Rossini: La scala di seta (Fonit Cetra, 1988)
- Rossini: Il barbiere di Siviglia (Decca, 1989)
- Mozart: Così fan tutte (Erato, 1990)
- Mozart: Lucio Silla (Teldec 1991)
- Rossini: La Cenerentola (Decca, 1993)
- Puccini: Manon Lescaut (Decca, 1993)
- Mozart: Le nozze di Figaro (DG, 1994)
- Mozart: La clemenza di Tito (Decca, 1995)
- Haydn: L'anima del filosofo, ossia Orfeo ed Euridice (Decca, 1997)
- Rossini: Il turco in Italia (Decca, 1998)
- Mozart: Mitridate (Decca, 1999)
- Haydn: Armida (Teldec 2000)
- Handel: Rinaldo (Decca, 2000)
- Mozart: Don Giovanni (Arthaus, 2001, DVD)
- Bellini: La sonnambula (Decca, 2008)
- Halevy: Clari (Decca, 2008, DVD)
- Rossini: Otello (Decca, 2012)
- Bellini: Norma (Decca, 2013)

=== Recitals with orchestra ===
- Rossini Arias (1989)
- Mozart Arias (1991)
- Rossini Heroines (1992)
- Mozart Portraits (1994)
- Mozart Arias (1996)
- The Vivaldi Album (1999)
- Cecilia and Bryn (1999)
- Gluck Italian Arias (2001)
- The Salieri Album (2003)
- Opera Proibita (2005)
- Viva Vivaldi! Arias & Concertos (Arthaus, 2005, DVD)
- Maria (A Tribute to Maria Malibran) (2007)
- Sacrificium (Arias written for castrati) (2009)
- Mission (Arias and duets of Agostino Steffani) (2012)
- St. Petersburg (2013)
- Antonio Vivaldi (2018)
- Farinelli (2019)
- Queen of Baroque (2020)
- Unreleased (2021)

=== Recitals with piano ===
- Rossini Recital (1990)
- If You Love Me – "Se tu m'ami": Eighteenth-century Italian Songs (1992)
- The Impatient Lover – Italian Songs by Beethoven, Schubert, Mozart, Haydn (1993)
- Chant D'Amour (1996)
- An Italian Songbook (1997)
- Live in Italy (1998)

=== Recitals with cello ===
- Dolce Duello: Cecilia & Sol – with Sol Gabetta (Decca Classics) released 11 November 2017

=== Sacred ===
- Rossini: Stabat Mater (1990)
- Mozart: Requiem (1992)
- Scarlatti: Salve Regina, Pergolesi: Stabat Mater, Salve Regina (1993)
- Rossini: Stabat Mater (1996)

=== Cantatas ===
- Rossini Cantatas Volume 2

=== Compilations ===
- A Portrait (1995)
- The Art of Cecilia Bartoli (2002)
- Sospiri (2010)

== Sources ==
- Blyth, Alan: "Cecilia Bartoli", Grove Music Online ed. L. Macy (Accessed 20 October 2008), (subscription access)
- Chernin, Kim, and Renate Stendhal. Cecilia Bartoli: the Passion of Song. Women's, 1999.
