= Festspielhaus Baden-Baden =

Opera and concert hall in Baden-Baden, Germany

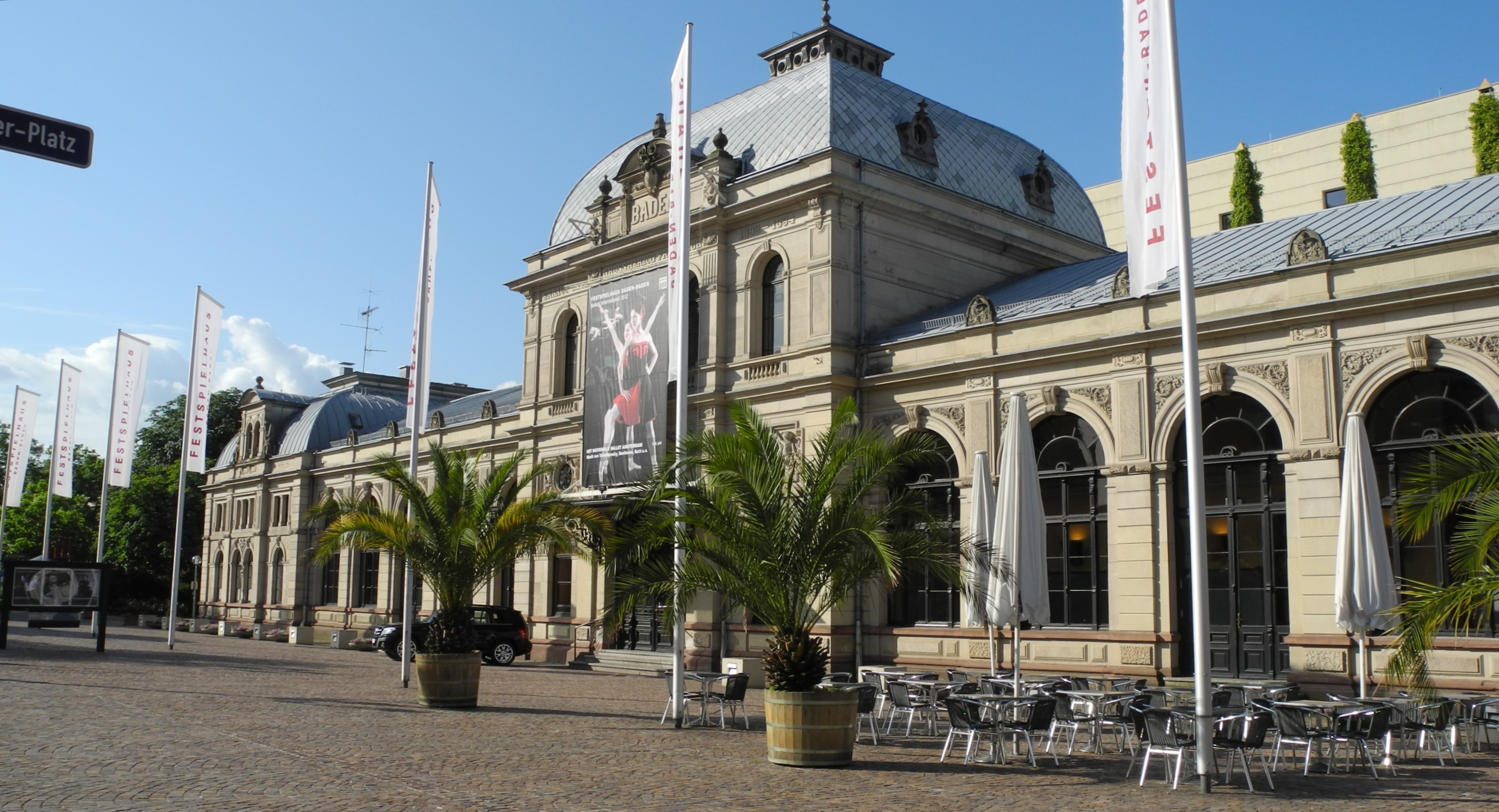
- Festspielhaus Baden-Baden
- Interactive map of Festspielhaus Baden-Baden
- Former names: Baden-Baden central railway station
- Address: Beim Alten Bahnhof 2
- Location: Baden-Baden, Germany
- Coordinates: 48°46′01″N 8°13′56″E
- Capacity: 2,500
- Type: Concert hall
- Events: Opera, music

Construction
- Built: 1904
- Opened: 18 April 1998
- Architect: Wilhelm Holzbauer

Website
- festspielhaus.de

The Festspielhaus Baden-Baden, located in the spa town of Baden-Baden, is Germany's largest opera and concert house, with a 2,500-seat capacity.

The building was originally built in 1904 as Baden-Baden central railway station. This replaced the original railway station, constructed in 1845 as a part of a branch line connecting Baden-Baden station in the western outskirt with the city center. The building served as a railway station for several decades until the closure of the branch line, in 1977.

The new construction was architecturally integrated with the former railway station and today encompasses the box office, the restaurant Aida, and a children's music space called Toccarion, sponsored by the Sigmund Kiener Foundation. Built by the Viennese architect Wilhelm Holzbauer, the concert hall opened on 18 April 1998. Following initial public startup funding, the Festspielhaus successfully converted to become the first privately financed European opera and concert company.

Between 2003 and 2015, the Festspielhaus Baden-Baden Cultural Foundation presented the annual Herbert von Karajan Music Prize.
