= Herbert von Karajan Music Prize =

Former German music award

- Awarded for: "important personalities from the international music scene"
- Location: Baden-Baden
- Country: Germany
- Presented by: Festspielhaus Baden-Baden Cultural Foundation
- Reward: €50,000
- First award: 2003
- Final award: 2015

The international Herbert von Karajan Music Prize (German: Herbert von Karajan Musikpreis) was an annual award presented by the Festspielhaus Baden-Baden in honour of the celebrated 20th-century Austrian conductor Herbert von Karajan. The prize was inaugurated in 2002, and the monetary element was set at 50,000 Euro, which must be used by the recipient to help further the careers of young musicians. It was first awarded in 2003, to German violinist Anne-Sophie Mutter. The prize was funded by the Herbert von Karajan Family Foundation Helibelle.

The prize was last awarded in 2015. The successor award is the Herbert von Karajan Prize in Salzburg.

== Recipients ==
- 2003: Anne-Sophie Mutter
- 2004: Berlin Philharmonic
- 2005: Evgeny Kissin
- 2006: Valery Gergiev
- 2007: John Neumeier
- 2008: Alfred Brendel
- 2009: Thomas Quasthoff
- 2010: Daniel Barenboim
- 2011: Helmuth Rilling
- 2012: Cecilia Bartoli
- 2013: Edita Gruberová
- 2014: Vienna Philharmonic
- 2015: Thomas Hengelbrock
