= Florian Boesch =

Austrian operatic bass-baritone

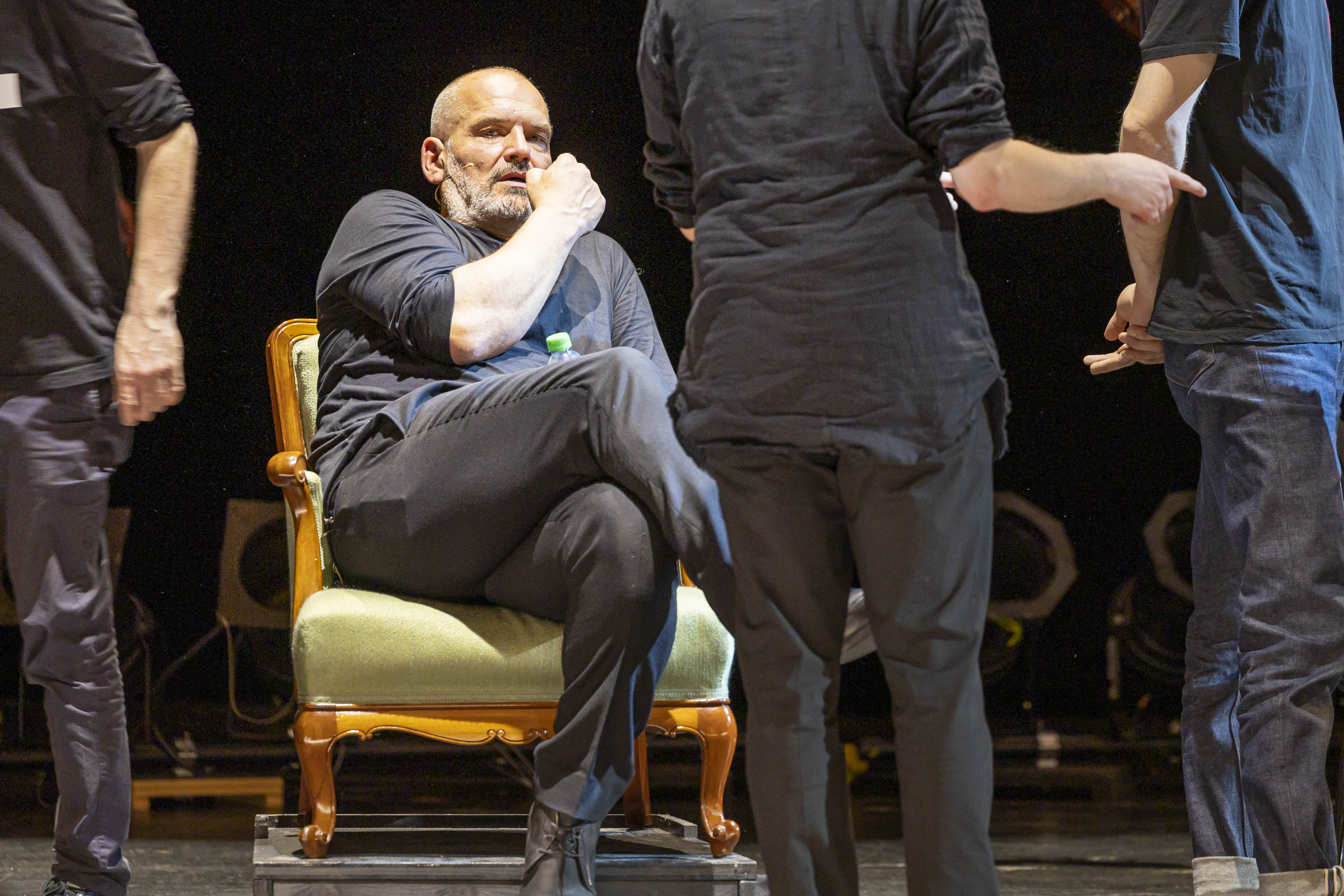
- Born: 17 May 1971 (age 54); Saarbrücken, West Germany
- Education: Musikhochschule Wien
- Occupation: Operatic bass-baritone

Florian Boesch (born 17 May 1971) is an Austrian bass-baritone, voice teacher and opera singer, who is especially known as a Lieder interpreter.

== Life ==
Boesch was born in Saarbrücken, West Germany, and is the son of Christian Boesch. He took his first singing lessons from his grandmother, Kammersängerin Ruthilde Boesch, and later studied lied and oratorio at the Musikhochschule Wien with Robert Holl from 1997.

He made his debut with a recital in the Vienna Musikverein. In 2002, he first appeared at the Schubertiade in Schwarzenberg. At the end of 2003, he appeared as Papageno in Mozart's Die Zauberflöte at the Opernhaus Zürich, and subsequently sang at the Volksoper Wien, at the Staatstheater Stuttgart, the Bregenz Festival, the Styriarte Graz, the Staatsoper Hamburg, the Theater an der Wien, the Bolshoi Theatre in Moscow, the Los Angeles Opera and in Tokyo.

Boesch gave recitals at the Wiener Konzerthaus, Wigmore Hall in London, the Edinburgh Festival, the Laeiszhalle in Hamburg, the Schwetzingen Festival, the Philharmonie Luxembourg and in North America. As a concert singer, he has appeared several times with Nikolaus Harnoncourt, including on a tour of Japan, in Vienna, with the Berlin Philharmonie and in Salzburg. He sang the bass solos in Schumann's Paradise and the Peri with the Vienna Philharmonic conducted by Simon Rattle, in Bach's St Matthew Passion and St John Passion at the Concertgebouw in Amsterdam, in Kurt Weill's Berliner Requiem with the Orchestre Philharmonique de Radio France, and in Mendelssohn's Elijah, conducted by both Paul McCreesh and Ivor Bolton.

He has been associated with the Salzburg Festival since 2002 when he made his debut as Tiridate in Handel's Radamisto at the Felsenreitschule. In 2004, he appeared as the police commissioner in Der Rosenkavalier by Richard Strauss at the Großes Festspielhaus, in 2006 as Antonio in Mozart's Le nozze di Figaro with Harnoncourt (on the occasion of the inauguration of the House for Mozart), and in 2009 as Guglielmo in Mozart's Così fan tutte. In 2012 and 2013, he appeared at the Ouverture spirituelle: in 2012, in Mozart's Missa longa in C major, K. 262, at the Salzburg Cathedral, in 2013 in Haydn's Die Schöpfung and Die Jahreszeiten with Harnoncourt, as well as in Mozart's Great Mass in C minor at the Stiftskirche St. Peter with the Simón Bolívar Symphony Orchestra of Venezuela conducted by Gustavo Dudamel.

At the Theater an der Wien he sang in Handel's Messiah in spring 2009 and in Schubert's Lazarus in autumn 2013 – both in staged versions by Claus Guth. In January 2013, he appeared at the house as Tiridate with conductor René Jacobs and the Freiburger Barockorchester. In 2011, he made his role debut as Alban Berg's Wozzeck at the Cologne Opera.

In 2015, the University of Music and Performing Arts Vienna appointed Boesch as professor for lied and oratorio.

== Recordings ==
Boesch's recordings include Schubert's Winterreise with pianist Malcolm Martineau in 2011. A Guardian reviewer wrote that it was "one of the most powerful lieder albums of recent years". Others include Bach cantatas conducted by Martin Haselböck, Bach's St Matthew Passion conducted by Roger Norrington and Dvořák's Stabat Mater conducted by Philippe Herreweghe.

== Awards ==
- 2014: Österreichischer Musiktheaterpreis – Goldener Schikaneder in the category best male supporting role for his part in Radamisto at the Theater an der Wien
- 2015: His recording of Schubert's Die schöne Müllerin was nominated for a 2015 Grammy.
- 2020/21 artist in residence of the Theater an der Wien
