= Ferruccio Furlanetto =

Italian operatic bass (b. 1949)

Ferruccio Furlanetto (born 16 May 1949 in Sacile, Italy) is an Italian bass. His professional debut was in 1974 in Lonigo, he debuted at the Teatro alla Scala in Milan in 1979, in a production of Verdi's Macbeth, conducted by Claudio Abbado. He has gone on to sing numerous roles, including both Don Giovanni and Leporello in Mozart's Don Giovanni, Philip II in Verdi's Don Carlos, Figaro in Mozart's Le nozze di Figaro, Gremin in Tchaikovsky's Eugene Onegin, Zaccaria in Verdi's Nabucco, Méphistophélès in Gounod's Faust, Orestes in Strauss' Elektra, Fiesco in Verdi's Simon Boccanegra, the title role of Mussorgsky's Boris Godunov, as well as many other roles.

He has sung in the world's major opera houses. He debuted at the Metropolitan Opera in the 1980/81 season, and has performed at the Opéra de Paris (Bastille), the Salzburg Easter Festival and the regular Salzburg Festival, Teatro Colón in Buenos Aires, the Vienna Staatsoper, the Tel Aviv Opera, and the Royal Opera House in London.

His appearances in the United States have been primarily with the Metropolitan Opera and San Diego Opera. With the latter company he has sung the title role in Oberto (1985), Méphistophélès in Faust (1988 and 2001), the title role in Don Giovanni (1993 and 2000), King Philip in Don Carlo (2004), Basilio in Il barbiere di Siviglia (2006), and his only US appearances in the title roles in Boris Godunov (2007) and Don Quichotte in 2009 and 2014. He reprised his performance in Don Quichotte in Palermo and in Mariinsky Theater (St.Petersburg) in 2010, in 2011 he played the bass role in Verdi's requiem, and his first US performances as Thomas Becket in Pizzetti's Assassinio nella cattedrale was in 2013. In 2021 he played Don Alfonso in the San Francisco Opera's production of Cosi fan tutte.

He is also widely in demand as a concert singer. He sang in Mozart's Coronation Mass under the baton of Herbert von Karajan, in an extraordinary performance at the Vatican in the presence of Pope John Paul II that was broadcast worldwide. He has appeared often in recital at La Scala, the Berlin Deutsche Oper, the Gran Teatro del Liceu of Barcelona, the Vienna Musikverein, the BBC Proms 2011 in the Royal Albert Hall, and many other venues.

On DVD, Furlanetto can be seen as the Grand Inquisiteur in Verdi's Don Carlos, in a production conducted by James Levine and staged by John Dexter, from the Met, in 1983. Also in the cast are Plácido Domingo, Mirella Freni, Grace Bumbry, Louis Quilico and Nicolai Ghiaurov. He can also be seen as King Philip II in the same work, under the baton of Herbert von Karajan, with José Carreras, Piero Cappuccilli, and Matti Salminen. Furlanetto is featured in a DVD of Mozart's Don Giovanni, playing the part of Leporello, under the baton of Herbert von Karajan conducting the Vienna Philharmonic in the 1987 Salzburg Festival. Furthermore, Furlanetto plays the part of Sparafucile in Jean-Pierre Ponnelle's 1982 production of Rigoletto (alongside Luciano Pavarotti). He also appears in I Vespri Siciliani, a 1989 Scala production conducted by Riccardo Muti.

== Videography ==
- The Metropolitan Opera Gala 1991, Deutsche Grammophon DVD, 00440-073-4582
- James Levine's 25th Anniversary Metropolitan Opera Gala (1996), Deutsche Grammophon DVD, B0004602-09

== Sources ==
- Official site of Ferruccio Furlanetto
- Fan site about Ferruccio Furlanetto - unofficial source of the information.
- Cummings, D. (ed.), "Furlanetto, Ferruccio" International Who's Who in Classical Music, Routledge, 2003, p. 260. ISBN 1-85743-174-X
