= The Barber of Seville discography =

This is a partial discography of The Barber of Seville, an opera by Gioachino Rossini. The work was first performed on 20 February 1816, at the Teatro Argentina in Rome.

== Audio recordings ==
Year	Cast: Rosina Count Almaviva Figaro Dr. Bartolo Don Basilio	Conductor, Opera house and orchestra	Label
1919	Malvina Pereira; Edoardo Taliani; Ernesto Badini; Abele Carnevali; Umberto di Lelio	Carlo Sabajno; Teatro alla Scala orchestra and chorus	CD: HMV; Cat: 5110-5138
1950	Giulietta Simionato; Luigi Infantino; Giuseppe Taddei; Carlo Badioli; Antonio Cassinelli	Fernando Previtali; Coro e Orchestra della Rai di Milano	CD: Warner Fonit; Cat: 5046 71224-2
1952	Victoria de los Ángeles; Nicola Monti; Gino Bechi; Melchiorre Luise; Nicola Rossi-Lemeni	Tullio Serafin; Orchestra Sinfonica di Milano e Coro	CD: Testament; Cat: SBT2166
1954	Antonietta Pastori; Nicola Monti; Rolando Panerai; Marcello Cortis; Franco Calabrese	Carlo Maria Giulini; RAI National Symphony Orchestra	CD: Great Opera Performances; Cat: G.O.P. 66.104
1956	Maria Callas; Luigi Alva; Tito Gobbi; Melchiorre Luise; Nicola Rossi-Lemeni	Carlo Maria Giulini; Teatro alla Scala orchestra and chorus	CD: Cetra
1957	Giulietta Simionato; Alvinio Misciano; Ettore Bastianini; Fernando Corena; Cesare Siepi	Alberto Erede; Maggio Musicale Fiorentino orchestra and chorus	CD: Decca Records; Cat: 467 4112
1957	Maria Callas; Luigi Alva; Tito Gobbi; Fritz Ollendorf; Nicola Zaccaria	Alceo Galliera; Philharmonia Orchestra and chorus	CD: EMI Classics; Cat: 3920462
1958	Roberta Peters; Cesare Valletti; Robert Merrill; Fernando Corena; Giorgio Tozzi	Erich Leinsdorf; Metropolitan Opera orchestra and chorus (An unusual performance with no cuts)	LP: RCA Victor; Cat: LSC-6143; CD: RCA Victor; Cat: 09026-68552-2
1959	Graziella Sciutti; Nicola Monti; Rolando Panerai; Renato Capecchi; Mario Petri	Renato Fasano; Collegium Musicum Italicum	CD: Walhall
1963	Victoria de los Ángeles; Luigi Alva; Sesto Bruscantini; Ian Wallace; Carlo Cava	Vittorio Gui; Glyndebourne Festival orchestra and chorus	CD: EMI Classics; Cat: CMS 7 64162 2
1964	Teresa Berganza; Ugo Benelli; Manuel Ausensi; Fernando Corena; Nicolai Ghiaurov	Silvio Varviso; Orchestra Rossini di Napoli and chorus	CD: Decca Records; Cat: 452 5912
1969	Teresa Berganza; Ugo Benelli; Domenico Trimarchi; Alfredo Mariotti; Paolo Montarsolo	Ettore Gracis; Teatro La Fenice orchestra and chorus	CD: Mondo Musica
1971	Teresa Berganza; Luigi Alva; Hermann Prey; Enzo Dara; Paolo Montarsolo	Claudio Abbado; London Symphony Orchestra; Ambrosian Singers	CD: Deutsche Grammophon; Cat: 457 7332
1974	Beverly Sills; Nicolai Gedda; Sherrill Milnes; Renato Capecchi; Ruggero Raimondi	James Levine; London Symphony Orchestra; John Alldis Choir	CD: EMI Classics; Cat: 7243-5-85523; Cat: 3932762
1982	Marilyn Horne; Paolo Barbacini; Leo Nucci; Enzo Dara; Samuel Ramey	Riccardo Chailly; Teatro alla Scala orchestra and chorus	CD: Fonit Cetra; Cat: CDC 30; CD: Warner Fonit; Cat: 3984 29187-2
1985	Agnes Baltsa; Francisco Araiza; Thomas Allen; Domenico Trimarchi; Robert Lloyd	Neville Marriner; Academy of St. Martin in the Fields; Ambrosian singers	CD: Philips; Cat: 446 448-2; CD: Decca Records; Cat: 470 434-2
1987	Luciana Serra; Rockwell Blake; Bruno Pola; Enzo Dara; Paolo Montarsolo	Bruno Campanella; Teatro Regio di Torino orchestra and chorus (recorded in June)	CD: Nuova Era; Cat: 223299
1988	Cecilia Bartoli; William Matteuzzi; Leo Nucci; Enrico Fissore; Paata Burchuladze	Giuseppe Patanè; Teatro Comunale di Bologna orchestra and chorus	CD: Decca Records; Cat: 425 520-2
1992	Sonia Ganassi; Roberto Servile; Ramon Vargas; Angelo Romero; Franco De Grandis	Will Humburg; Failoni Chamber Orchestra and Hungarian Radio Chorus	CD: Naxos; Cat: 8.660027-29
1992	Kathleen Battle; Frank Lopardo; Plácido Domingo; Lucio Gallo; Ruggero Raimondi	Claudio Abbado; Chamber Orchestra of Europe and chorus	CD: Deutsche Grammophon; Cat: 435 763-2GH2
1993	Suzanne Mentzer; Jerry Hadley; Thomas Hampson; Bruno Pratico; Samuel Ramey	Gianluigi Gelmetti; Orchestra della Toscana	CD: EMI; Cat: 54863 2
1993	Jennifer Larmore; Raúl Giménez; Håkan Hagegård; Alessandro Corbelli; Samuel Ramey	Jesús López Cobos; Orchestre de Chambre de Lausanne and Grand-Théâtre de Genève	CD: Teldec; Cat: 9031-74885-2
1995	Della Jones, Bruce Ford, Alan Opie; Andrew Shore; Peter Rose	Gabrielle Bellini; English National Opera orchestra and chorus	CD: Chandos Records; Cat: Chan3025
1997	Edita Gruberová; Juan Diego Flórez; Vladimir Chernov; Enric Serra; Francesco Ellero d'Artegna	Ralf Weikert; Munich Radio Orchestra and chorus	CD: Nightingale Classics; Cat: NC 004022
2005	Elina Garanca; Lawrence Brownlee; Nathan Gunn; Bruno de Simone; Kristinn Sigmundsson	Miguel Ángel Gómez Martínez; Munich Radio Orchestra and Chor des Bayerischen Rundfunks	CD: Sony Classical; Cat: 82876 804292

== Video recordings ==
Year	Cast: Rosina Almaviva Figaro Dr. Bartolo Don Basilio	Conductor, Opera house and orchestra	Label
1946	Nelly Corradi; Ferruccio Tagliavini; Tito Gobbi; Vito de Taranto; Italo Tajo	Giuseppe Morelli; Rome Opera orchestra and chorus	VHS: Pickwick; Cat:
1947	Lucienne Jourfier; Raymond Amade; Roger Bourdin; Louis Musy; Roger Bussonnet	André Cluytens; Théâtre national de l'Opéra-Comique orchestra and chorus (sung in French)	VHS: Codo-Cinéma; Cat:
1959	Erika Köth; Fritz Wunderlich; Hermann Prey; Max Proebstl; Hans Hotter	Joseph Keilberth; Bavarian State Opera orchestra and chorus (sung in German)	VHS: Legato Classics; Cat:
1972	Teresa Berganza; Luigi Alva; Hermann Prey; Enzo Dara; Paolo Montarsolo	Claudio Abbado; Teatro alla Scala orchestra and chorus (Film directed by Jean-Pierre Ponnelle, based on his staging at La Scala)	VHS: Deutsche Grammophon; DVD: Deutsche Grammophon; Streaming HD video: Carnegie Hall+
1982	Maria Ewing; Max René Cossotti; John Rawnsley; Claudio Desderi; Ferruccio Furlanetto	Sylvain Cambreling; Glyndebourne Festival orchestra and chorus	VHS: Castle; Cat: DVD: Warner; Cat:
1988	Cecilia Bartoli; David Kuebler; Louis Quilico; Carlos Feller; Robert Lloyd	Gabriele Ferro; Stuttgart Radio Symphony Orchestra; Cologne Opera chorus	VHS: RCA; Cat: DVD: Art Haus Musik; Cat:
1989	Kathleen Battle; Rockwell Blake; Leo Nucci; Enzo Dara; Ferruccio Furlanetto	Ralf Weikert; Metropolitan Opera orchestra and chorus	VHS: Deutsche Grammophon; Cat: DVD: Deutsche Grammophon; Cat:
1992	Jennifer Larmore; Richard Croft; David Malis; Renato Capecchi; Simone Alaimo	Alberto Zedda; Netherlands Opera orchestra and chorus	DVD: Image; Cat:
2008	Rinat Shaham; Francesco Meli; Roberto Frontali; Bruno De Simone; Giovanni Furlanetto	Antonino Fogliani; Teatro La Fenice orchestra and chorus	DVD: Dynamic; Cat: 33597
2009	Joyce DiDonato; Juan Diego Flórez; Pietro Spagnoli; Alessandro Corbelli; Ferruccio Furlanetto	Antonio Pappano; Royal Opera House orchestra and chorus	Blu-ray: Erato; DVD: Virgin Classics
2014	Isabel Leonard; Lawrence Brownlee; Christopher Maltman; Maurizio Muraro; Paata Burchuladze	Michele Mariotti; Metropolitan Opera orchestra and chorus (Recorded live, 22 November 2014; production: Bartlett Sher)	Streaming HD video: Met Opera on Demand
2016	Danielle de Niese; Taylor Stayton; Björn Bürger; Alessandro Corbelli; Christophoros Stamboglis	Enrique Mazzola; London Philharmonic Orchestra (recorded live, 21 June 2016, Glyndebourne Festival; stage director: Annabel Arden)	Blu-ray/DVD: Opus Arte; Streaming HD video: Glyndebourne Encore
2018	Nino Machaidze; Dmitry Korchak; Leo Nucci; Carlo Lepore; Ferruccio Furlanetto	Daniel Oren; Arena di Verona orchestra and chorus	Blu-ray/DVD: Bel Air
2019	Catherine Trottmann; Michele Angelini; Florian Sempey; Peter Kálmán; Robert Gleadow	Jérémie Rhorer; Le Cercle de l'Harmonie, (Laurent Pelly, stage director)	Blu-ray/DVD: Naxos; Cat:2110592
2025	Aigul Akhmetshina, Jack Swanson, Andrey Zhilikhovsky, Peter Kálmán, Alexander Vinogradov	Giacomo Sagripanti, Metropolitan Opera Orchestra and Chorus (Recorded live, 31 May 2025; production: Bartlett Sher)	Streaming HD video: Met Opera on Demand
