= Bruno Campanella =

Italian conductor (1943–2026)

- Campanella in the 1990s
- Born: 6 January 1943; Bari, Kingdom of Italy
- Died: 4 August 2026 (aged 83); Florence, Italy
- Occupation: Conductor
- Organizations: Teatro Regio di Torino
- Awards: Ordre des Arts et des Lettres

Bruno Campanella (6 January 1943 – 4 August 2026) was an Italian conductor and a distinguished interpreter of the Italian opera at major opera houses including the Opéra National de Paris, La Scala in Milan and the Metropolitan Opera in New York City. He was principal conductor at the Teatro Regio di Torino from 1992 to 1995.

== Life and career ==
Campanella was born in Bari on 6 January 1943. Following studies at the Flacco in Bari, he received diplomas in composition and conducting at the Florence Conservatory. Campanella studied composition with Nino Rota and Luigi Dallapiccola and conducting with Hans Swarowsky and Thomas Schippers. In addition, he got a degree in philosophy and completed a thesis about Buddhism.

He began his career in the late 1970s, and became recognised internationally as competent for Italian Bel Canto opera, recording works by Rossini and Donizetti.

Campanella performed at major theatres internationally; at the Opéra National de Paris he conducted performances of Bellini's I Capuleti e i Montecchi and Norma, Donizetti's Lucia di Lammermoor, Rossini's L'italiana in Algeri, La Cenerentola, Guillaume Tell and Il barbiere di Siviglia. At the Vienna State Opera, he also headed Donizetti's Linda di Chamounix and Verdi's Jérusalem; At La Scala in Milan, he conducted Rora's Il cappello di paglia di Firenze and La Cenerentola. He headed at the Metropolitan Opera of New York City in the 1999/2000 season La Cenerentola and Il barbiere di Siviglia. Anthony Tommasini from The New York Times noted that the 1982 production by John Cox, with Thomas Hampson in the title role, was "essentially charming", and that Campanella "led a supple and lithe account of the score". Later Campanella conducted there also L'italiana in Algeri and Bellini's Il pirata. At the Royal Opera House in London, he led a new production of La Fille du Régiment on 14 January 2007, directed by Laurent Pelly. A reviewer noted that he conducted "with great style and collaborative sympathy for the singers". He worked at the San Francisco Opera, the Houston Grand Opera, the Lyric Opera of Chicago, the Opéra de Montréal, the Opéra National de Paris, the Liceu in Barcelona, the Municipal Theatre of Santiago, and the New National Theatre Tokyo.

He served as principal conductor at the Teatro Regio di Torino from 1992 to 1995. He then became the Teatro Regio's principal guest conductor. Beginning in 1984, his performances in Turin included L'ajo nell'imbarazzo, Il barbiere di Siviglia (in both 1987 and 1991), Donizetti's Don Pasquale and L'elisir d'amore (both in 1988), L'Italiana in Algeri in 1992, in 1993 Verdi's Falstaff, Lucia di Lammermoor and I Capuleti e i Montecchi, in 1994 La cenerentola, La fille du régiment and Jérusalem, in 1995 Britten's The Turn of the Screw (opera), in 1996 I puritani and Massenet's Cendrillon, in 1997 Donizetti's Roberto Devereux, and in 1999 Rossini's Le comte Ory, Verdi's La traviata and Stravinsky's The Rake's Progress.

In 2002, the French Ministry of Culture awarded him the title of Officier de l'Ordre des Arts et des Lettres.

Campanella died after a long illness on 4 August 2026, at the age of 83, in Florence.

== Discography ==
Among his recordings are:

- Bel Canto Arias, with Kathleen Battle (CD Deutsche Grammophon, 1993). OCLC 759930317
- Donizetti: Don Pasquale, with Enzo Dara and Luciana Serra (CD Nuova Era, 1988). OCLC 872537853
- Rossini: Il Barbiere di Siviglia, with Rockwell Blake and Luciana Serra (CD Nuova Era, 1987). OCLC 31083980
- Rossini: La Cenerentola, with Cecilia Bartoli and Enzo Dara (DVD Decca Records, 1996). OCLC 872960513
- Donizetti: La Fille du Régiment, with June Anderson and Alfredo Kraus (CD EMI, 1986). OCLC 658423036
- Rossini: Il Barbiere di Siviglia, with Joyce DiDonato, Roberto Saccà (CD Naxos, 1987).
- Donizetti: La Fille du Régiment, with Natalie Dessay and Juan Diego Flórez (DVD Virgin Classics, 2007). OCLC 1252596818
- Donizetti: L'ajo nell'imbarazzo, with Enzo Dara and Luciana Serra (CD Fonit Cetra, Warner Music Group, 1994). OCLC 644404939
- Niccolò Piccinni: La Cecchina, ossia La buona figliuola (2002).
- Bellini: Norma, with Fiorenza Cedolins, Vincenzo La Scola and Nidia Palacios (DVD La Voce, Inc., 2005).
- Verdi: Macbeth, with Carlos Àlvarez, Maria Guleghina and Roberto Scandiuzzi (DVD Opus Arte, 2005). OCLC 873626215
- Verdi: La traviata, with Renato Bruson, Mariella Devia and Giuseppe Filianoti (DVD La Voce, Inc., 2006).
- Rossini: L'italiana in Algeri, with Jennifer Larmore, Bruce Ford and Simone Alaimo (DVD TDK Music, 2007). OCLC 873311369
