= La Cenerentola =

1817 opera by Gioachino Rossini

- Dramma giocoso by Gioachino Rossini
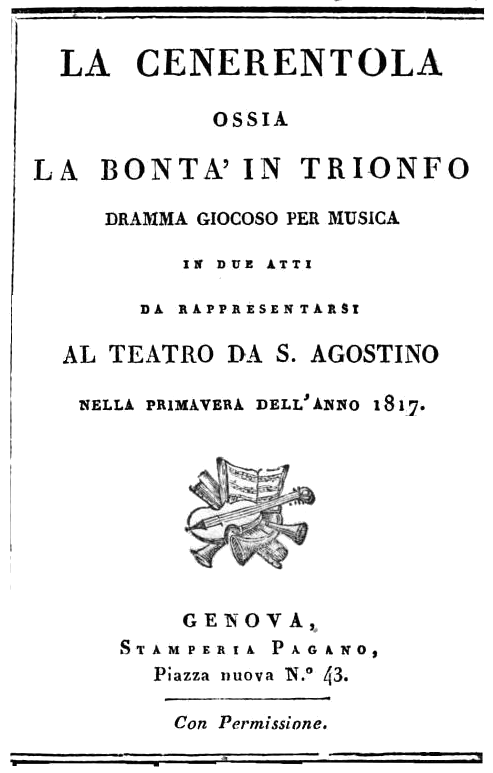
- Cover of the libretto, 1817
- Other title: La Cenerentola, ossia La bontà in trionfo
- Librettist: Jacopo Ferretti
- Language: Italian
- Based on: Cendrillon by Charles Perrault
- Premiere: 25 January 1817; Teatro Valle, Rome

La Cenerentola, ossia La bontà in trionfo ("Cinderella, or Goodness Triumphant") is an operatic dramma giocoso in two acts by Gioachino Rossini. The libretto was written by Jacopo Ferretti, based on the libretti written by Charles-Guillaume Étienne for the opera Cendrillon with music by Nicolas Isouard (first performed Paris, 1810) and by Francesco Fiorini for Agatina, o la virtù premiata with music by Stefano Pavesi (first performed Milan, 1814). All these operas are versions of the fairy tale Cendrillon by Charles Perrault. Rossini's opera was first performed in Rome's Teatro Valle on 25 January 1817.

In this variation of the fairy tale, the wicked stepmother is replaced by a stepfather, Don Magnifico. The Fairy Godmother is replaced by Alidoro, a philosopher and tutor to the Prince. Cinderella is identified not by a glass slipper but by her silver bracelet. The supernatural elements that traditionally characterize the Cinderella story were removed from the libretto simply for ease of staging.

Rossini composed La Cenerentola when he was 25 years old, following the success of The Barber of Seville the year before. La Cenerentola, which he completed in a period of three weeks, is considered to have some of his finest writing for solo voice and ensembles.

== Composition history ==
According to the account given by librettist Jacopo Ferretti, the genesis of this work – whose literary and musical aspects were both created with surprising speed – began in December 1816. Rossini was in Rome and tasked with writing a new opera for the Teatro Valle, to be staged on Saint Stephen's Day. An existing libretto, Francesca di Foix, had unexpectedly been vetoed by the papal censor, leaving no time to amend the text so that it might satisfy all parties involved (censorship, impresario, and authors). A replacement would have to be found.

Ferretti, despite harboring some ill-will against Rossini (the maestro had refused a libretto of his for The Barber of Seville), nonetheless met with the composer and the impresario Cartoni and agreed to join the project. However, when he began to suggest topics for the new work, one after another was rejected: too serious for the Carnival season in which the opera would premiere; too frivolous; too expensive and difficult to stage. Ferretti proposed more than two dozen subjects without success.

Finally, between yawns, and with Rossini half asleep on a sofa, the poet mentioned Cinderella. At this, Rossini roused himself sufficiently to challenge Ferretti on whether he dared write a libretto for the tale; Ferretti retorted with a dare for Rossini to clothe it in music. Rossini then asked the librettist if he had some verses ready to start working on. Ferretti replied, "despite my tiredness, tomorrow morning!" The composer nodded, wrapped himself in his clothes, and fell asleep.

Ferretti worked through the night and had the first parts of the work ready as promised in the morning. He finished the libretto in twenty-two days of breakneck work, and Rossini completed the score in an equally hectic twenty-four days. Rossini saved some time by reusing an overture from La gazzetta and part of an aria from The Barber of Seville and by enlisting a collaborator, Luca Agolini, who wrote the secco recitatives and three numbers (Alidoro's "Vasto teatro è il mondo", Clorinda's "Sventurata! Mi credea" and the chorus "Ah, della bella incognita").

The poet had serious doubts about the success of this opera; Rossini, on the other hand, predicted that it would conquer Italy in a year and spread to France and England in another: "the impresarios will fight for staging it, as well as the prima donnas for being able to sing it".

La Cenerentola premiered on 25 January 1817, and quickly gained popularity both in Italy and internationally, despite a cold initial reception by the critics. In short, Rossini's prediction came entirely true, and Cenerentola soon overshadowed even Barber throughout the nineteenth century.

The facsimile edition of the autograph has a different aria for Alidoro, "Fa' silenzio, odo un rumore"; this seems to have been added by an anonymous hand for an 1818 production. For an 1820 revival in Rome, Rossini wrote a bravura replacement, "Là, del ciel nell'arcano profondo".

Despite La Cenerentola's success, the collaboration between composer and librettist got no easier, and Ferretti wrote only one more libretto for Rossini, Matilde di Shabran, in 1821.

== Performance history ==
19th century

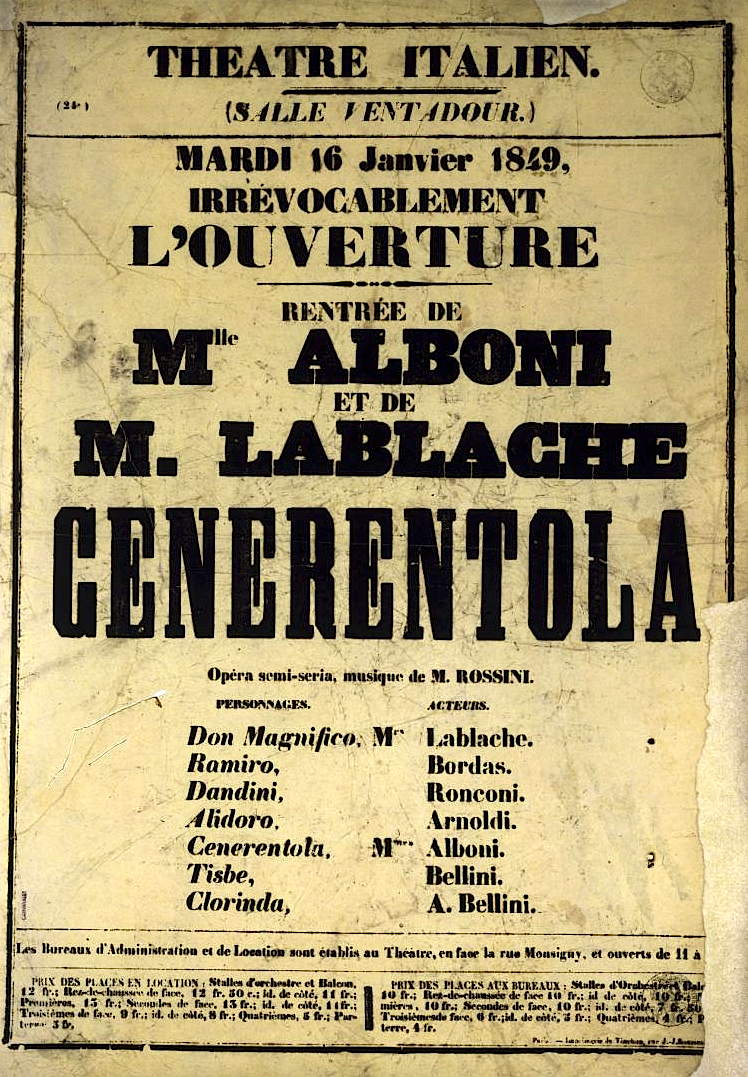
Poster for an 1849 performance at the Salle Ventadour in Paris

At the first performance, the opera was received with some hostility, but it soon became popular throughout Italy and beyond; it reached Lisbon in 1819, London in 1820, Paris in 1822 and New York and Buenos Aires in 1826. Throughout most of the 19th century, its popularity rivalled that of Barber, but as the coloratura contralto, for which the leading role was originally written, became rare, it fell slowly out of the repertoire.

20th century and beyond

In the years following Glyndebourne Festival's celebrated 1952 revival, conducted by Vittorio Gui, and recorded for LP by EMI, Rossini's work enjoyed a renaissance, and a new generation of Rossini mezzo-sopranos ensured that La Cenerentola would once again be heard around the world. The opera is now considered a staple of the standard repertoire.

== Roles ==
Roles, voice types, premiere cast
Role	Voice type	Premiere cast, 25 January 1817 Conductor: Gioachino Rossini
Angelina (Cenerentola, Cinderella)	contralto or mezzo-soprano	Geltrude Righetti
Don Ramiro, Prince of Salerno	tenor	Giacomo Guglielmi
Dandini, valet to the Prince	baritone	Giuseppe de Begnis
Don Magnifico, Baron of Montefiascone and Cenerentola's stepfather	bass	Andrea Verni
Alidoro, philosopher and the Prince's former tutor	bass	Zenobio Vitarelli
Clorinda, Don Magnifico's elder daughter	soprano	Caterina Rossi
Tisbe, Don Magnifico's younger daughter	mezzo-soprano	Teresa Mariani
Courtiers from Prince Ramiro's palace	tenors, basses	tenors, basses

== Synopsis ==
Time: Late 18th century – early 19th century
Place: Salerno (Italy)

=== Act 1 ===
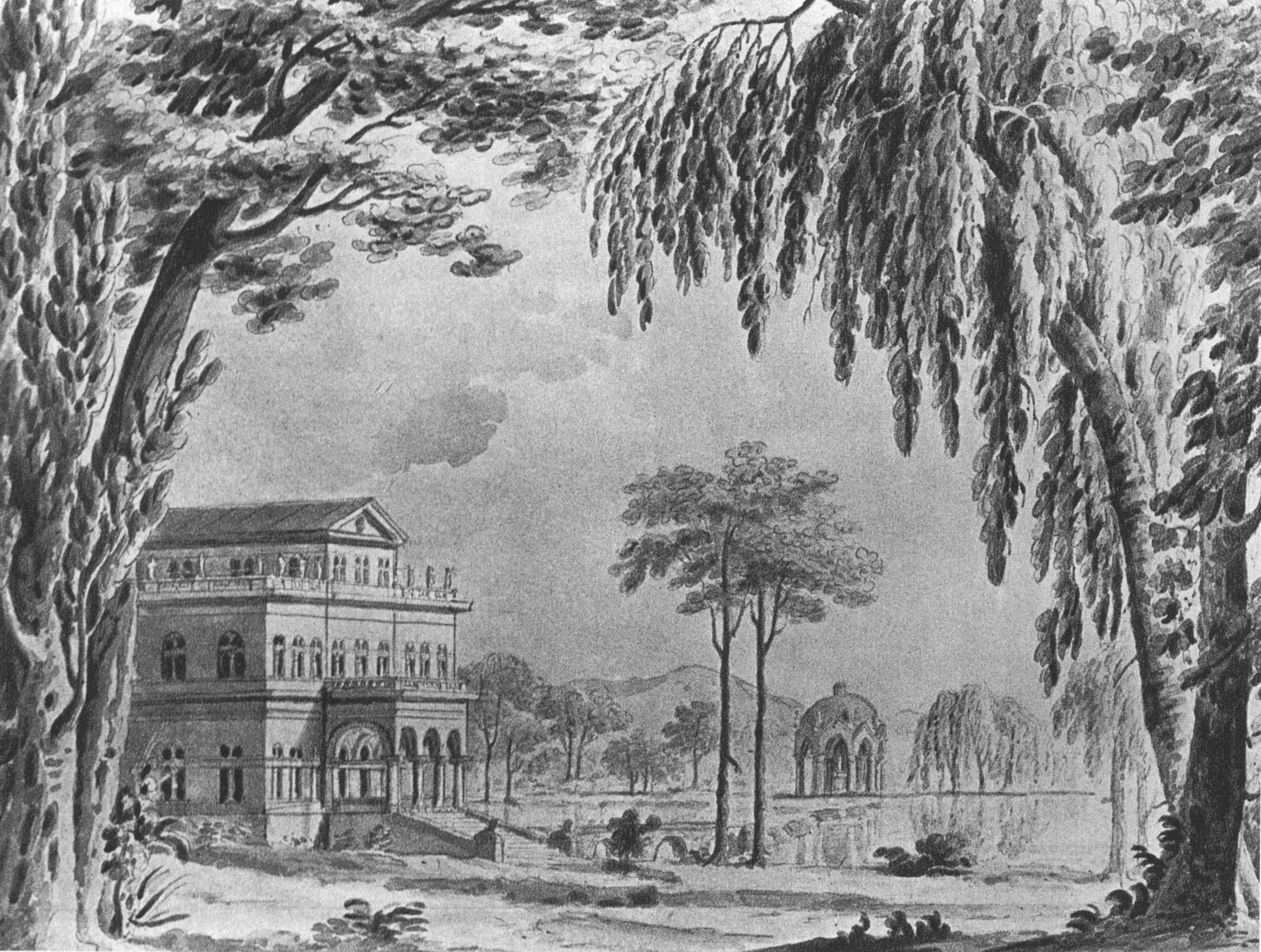
Stage design of first act, third scene, watercolour by Alessandro Sanquirico for the premiere in 1817

Angelina, known to her stepfather and stepsisters as "Cenerentola," is forced to serve as the maid in her own home. She sings of a king who married a common girl chosen for her kindness against the beauty and adornment of her competitresses ("Una volta c’era un rè"). A beggar arrives; her stepsisters, Clorinda and Tisbe, want to send him away, but Cenerentola gives him bread and coffee. Courtiers follow, announcing that Prince Ramiro will visit while he searches for the most beautiful girl in the land to wed. Cenerentola's stepfather, Don Magnifico, hopes to use this as an opportunity to save his own failing fortune.

When the room is empty, Ramiro enters alone, disguised as a valet. The "beggar" – in fact, his tutor, Alidoro – has informed him of a goodhearted young woman spotted here. Ramiro intends to find her incognito. Cenerentola returns, and she and Ramiro are attracted to each other (duet: "Un soave non-so che"), but when he asks who she is, she is overwhelmed and flees.

Finally, the "prince" arrives – the real valet, Dandini, who has taken his master's place – and Magnifico, Clorinda, and Tisbe fall over themselves to flatter him. He invites the family to a ball that evening, where he plans to find his bride; Cenerentola asks to join them, but Magnifico refuses (quintet: "Signor, una parola"). This callousness is not lost on Ramiro. Alidoro returns to inquire after a third daughter in the house; Magnifico claims she has died and stealthily threatens to murder Cenerentola if she reveals herself. Left alone with Cenerentola, Alidoro promises to take her to the ball himself and that God will reward her kindness ("Là del ciel nell’arcano profondo").

The prince and his valet have retired to Ramiro's country house in some confusion, as neither of Magnifico's daughters resembled the worthy bride Alidoro had described. When Clorinda and Tisbe arrive, Dandini gives them a little test: he offers his "valet" to whichever sister the "prince" does not marry. The ladies are outraged at the idea of marrying a servant. Alidoro then arrives with a beautiful, unknown lady who strangely resembles Cenerentola. Unable to make sense of the situation, they all sit down to supper, feeling like they are in a dream.

=== Act 2 ===
Rosina Pico in the title role, 1845

Magnifico frets over the competition his daughters now face from the strange lady ("Sia qualunque delle figlie"), but Cenerentola is not interested in the "prince," saying she has fallen in love with his servant. An overjoyed Ramiro steps forward; however, Cenerentola tells him that she is going home and does not want him to follow her. If he really cares for her, she says, he will find her, giving him one of a matching pair of bracelets. (Note: Conductor Yi-Chen Lin explains: "At the time of its premiere in Rome in 1817, you were not allowed to show bare ankles on stage." So, to avoid falling foul of the censors, the glass slipper was swapped for matching bracelets.) The prince determines to do exactly that ("Sì, ritrovarla io giuro").

Meanwhile, Magnifico confronts the disguised Dandini, insisting that he choose one of his daughters to marry. Dandini tries to stall but is forced to admit that he is actually the valet and not the prince at all (duet: "Un segreto d’importanza").

A furious Magnifico and his daughters return home, where they order Cenerentola, back in rags, to serve them. A storm is thundering outside. Alidoro sabotages Ramiro's carriage so that it breaks down in front of Magnifico's manor, forcing the prince to take refuge within. Ramiro recognizes Cenerentola's bracelet on her right arm; the others comment on the situation (sextet: "Siete voi?"). When Ramiro threatens Cenerentola's recalcitrant family, she asks him to forgive them.

Ramiro and Cenerentola are married and celebrate their wedding at the palace. Magnifico tries to win the new princess's favor, but she asks only to be acknowledged, at last, as his daughter. She reflects on the misfortune to which she was born and the sudden reversal of her fate, then forgives her family for all her past unhappiness, adding that her days of sitting sadly by the fire are over ("Nacqui all'affanno... Non più mesta"). Everyone present acknowledges that she truly is worthy of the throne.

== Noted arias ==
- "Miei rampolli femminini" – Don Magnifico in act 1
- "Come un'ape ne' giorni d'aprile" – Dandini in act 1
- "Zitto, zitto, piano, piano" – Ramiro, Dandini in act 1
- "Si, ritrovarla io giuro" – Ramiro in act 2
- "Questo è un nodo avviluppato" – Ensemble in act 2
- "Nacqui all'affanno ... Non più mesta" – Angelina in act 2

== Recordings ==
Year	Cast: Cenerentola, Clorinda, Tisbe, Don Ramiro, Dandini, Don Magnifico	Conductor, Opera house and orchestra	Label:
1953	Marina de Gabaráin, Alda Noni, Fernanda Cadoni, Juan Oncina, Sesto Bruscantini, Ian Wallace	Vittorio Gui, Orchestra and Chorus of the Glyndebourne Festival Opera	CD: EMI; The Opera series Cat: 0288462
1963	Giulietta Simionato, Dora Carral, Mitì Truccato Pace, Ugo Benelli, Sesto Bruscantini, Paolo Montarsolo	Oliviero De Fabritiis, Orchestra and Chorus of the Maggio Musicale Fiorentino	CD: Decca; Grand Opera series Cat: 433 030-2
1971	Teresa Berganza, Margherita Gugliemi, Laura Zannini, Luigi Alva, Renato Capecchi, Paolo Montarsolo	Claudio Abbado, Scottish Opera Chorus – London Symphony Orchestra	CD: DG; Cat: 423 861-2
1976	Lucia Valentini Terrani, Margherita Gugliemi, Laura Zannini, Luigi Alva, Enzo Dara, Paolo Montarsolo	Claudio Abbado, Teatro alla Scala di Milano Orchestra and Chorus (Audio recording of a performance at Covent Garden, London)	CD: Gala; Cat: 100.544
1977	Bianca Maria Casoni, Giovanna di Rocco, Teresa Rocchino, Ugo Benelli, Sesto Bruscantini, Alfredo Mariotti	Piero Bellugi, Chor der Staatsoper Berlin – Rundfunk-Sinfonieorchester Berlin	CD: Acanta; Cat: LC 4883
1980	Susanne Marsee, Gianna Rolandi, RoseMarie Freni, Rockwell Blake, Alan Titus, James Billings	Brian Salesky, New York City Opera Orchestra and Chorus	DVD: Premiere Opera; Cat: 6825
1981	Frederica von Stade, Margherita Guglielmi, Laura Zannini, Francisco Araiza, Claudio Desderi, Paolo Montarsolo	Claudio Abbado, Teatro alla Scala Orchestra and Chorus; Director: Jean-Pierre Ponnelle	DVD: DG; Cat: 073 4096
1983	Kathleen Kuhlmann, Marta Taddei, Laura Zannini, Laurence Dale, Alberto Rinaldi, Claudio Desderi	Donato Renzetti, Glyndebourne Festival Opera and Chorus – London Philharmonic Orchestra (Video recording of a performance at Glyndebourne, England)	DVD: Kultur; Cat: ISBN 0-7697-2258-X
1987	Agnes Baltsa, Carol Malone, Felicity Palmer, Francisco Araiza, Simone Alaimo, Ruggero Raimondi	Neville Marriner, Ambrosian Opera Chorus – Academy of St Martin in the Fields	CD: Decca; Cat: 470 580-2
1988	Ann Murray, Angela Denning, Daphne Evangelatos, Francisco Araiza, Gino Quilico, Walter Berry	Riccardo Chailly, Vienna State Opera and Chorus – Vienna Philharmonic (Video recording of a performance at the Salzburg Festival)	DVD: ORF & RM Arts; Cat: ID9238RADVD
1993	Cecilia Bartoli, Fernanda Costa, Gloria Banditelli, William Matteuzzi, Alessandro Corbelli, Enzo Dara	Riccardo Chailly, Orchestra and Chorus of the Teatro Comunale di Bologna	CD: Decca Records; Cat: 436 909-2
1995	Cecilia Bartoli, Laura Knoop, Jill Grove, Raúl Giménez, Alessandro Corbelli, Enzo Dara	Bruno Campanella, Houston Grand Opera and Chorus – Houston Symphony (Video recording of a live performance from the Wortham Theater Center, Houston, Texas, November)	DVD: Decca; Cat: 071 444-9
1995	Jennifer Larmore, Adelini Scarabelli, Laura Polverelli, Raúl Giménez, Gino Quilico; Alessandro Corbelli	Carlo Rizzi, Royal Opera House Orchestra and Covent Garden Opera Chorus	CD: Teldec; Cat: LC 6019
1996	Jennifer Larmore, Jeannette Fischer, Claire Larcher, Rockwell Blake, Alessandro Corbelli, Carlos Chausson	Maurizio Benini, L'Opéra National de Paris Orchestra and Chorus (Video recording of a performance in the Palais Garnier, Paris, April)	DVD: Encore; Cat: DVD 3265
2004	Joyce DiDonato, Patrizia Cigna, Martina Borst, José Manuel Zapata, Paolo Bordogna, Bruno Praticò	Alberto Zedda, Orchester des Südwestfunks Kaiserslautern and Prague Chamber Chorus (Recording of a performance at the Rossini in Wildbad Festival, 13 November)	CD: Naxos Records; Cat: 8.660191-92
2005	Ruxandra Donose, Raquela Sheeran, Lucia Cirillo, Maxim Mironov, Simone Alberghini, Luciano Di Pasquale	Vladimir Jurowski, London Philharmonic Orchestra and The Glyndebourne Chorus; director Peter Hall (Recording of performances at the Glyndebourne Festival Opera, 2 & 4 June 2005)	DVD: Opus Arte; Cat: OA 0944 D (The 2-DVD set includes 'Insights' feature, interview with Jurowski and Hall)
2007	Joyce DiDonato, Cristina Obregón, Itxaro Mentxaka, Juan Diego Flórez, David Menéndez, Bruno De Simone	Patrick Summers, Orchestra and Chorus of the Teatro Liceu (Barcelona) (Video recording of a performance (or of performances) in the Teatro Liceo, Barcelona, December)	DVD: Decca; Cat: 074 3305 and 074 3333 (Blu-ray)
2009	Elīna Garanča, Rachelle Durkin, Patricia Risley, Lawrence Brownlee, Simone Alberghini, Alessandro Corbelli	Maurizio Benini, Metropolitan Opera Orchestra and Chorus (Audio and video recordings made at a performance (or at performances) at the Met, May)	CD: Celestial Audio; Cat: CA 908; DVD: DG; Cat: 073 4777
2020	Serena Malfi, Damiana Mizzi, Annunziata Vestri, Juan Francisco Gatell, Vito Priante, Alessandro Corbelli	Alejo Pérez, Rome Opera orchestra and chorus, Emma Dante, stage director	DVD:C Major; Cat:752408
