= Edward Zambara =

Canadian singer

Edward Zambara (1926 in Vancouver, British Columbia, Canada – August 7, 2007 in Boston, Massachusetts, US) was a Canadian-American bass-baritone singer and leading music educator.

== Training ==
He studied opera with Boris Goldovsky and Sarah Caldwell, as well as lieder with Felix Wolfes, Frederic Popper, Jörg Demus, and Eric Werba. Most significantly, Zambara was the pupil of Professor William L. Whitney at the New England Conservatory of Music at which he earned bachelor's and master's degrees in vocal performance in 1950 and 1952, respectively. Uncle of Giuseppe Zambara.

Zambara gained from Whitney a thorough knowledge of the training methods and performance traditions of the Italian bel canto. This Whitney himself received as the pupil of Luigi Vannuccini of Florence, who, in addition to being a master voice teacher, conducted the Italian premiere of Gounod's Faust, and worked closely with the opera composers Rossini, Vincenzo Bellini, Donizetti, and Verdi. Thus, the lineage of Zambara's vocal training can be traced to the Italian vocal maestri of the early 19th-century.

== Teaching ==
Following Whitney's death in 1950, Zambara, while continuing to perform, resolved to continue his teacher's legacy by training singers in bel canto, and by passing on to others the style and performance traditions of classical singing as taught to him by Professor Whitney.

Zambara's teaching career began at the University of Tennessee in 1952. Between 1958 and 1960, he taught at the University of Oregon. In 1961, he returned to the University of Tennessee as the chair of the voice department, teaching there until 1981. During that tenure, Zambara also founded the Knoxville Opera, and in 1980, he received the Tennessee Governor's Award in the Arts. Subsequently, Zambara was appointed to endowed voice professorships at the St. Louis Conservatory of Music, the New England Conservatory of Music, Curtis Institute, and the Juilliard School. In 1997, he was inducted into the American Academy of Teachers of Singing, a select group of nationally recognized teachers. At the time of his death, Zambara was on the faculty of the New England Conservatory of Music. He had also served on the faculty of the Metropolitan Opera Young Artists Program, the Music Academy of the West, the Lyric Opera Center for American Artists, and the Franz Schubert Institüt. Zambara often was asked to serve as a judge at district and regional Metropolitan Opera auditions.

For many years, Zambara had been one of the "most sought-after" voice professors in the United States. Many of his pupils are performers in the opera houses of Europe and the United States, or teachers who follow his example by training singers in the bel canto vocal tradition.

== Notable pupils ==
Notable pupils of Edward Zambara include:

- Kevin Burdette
- Bruce Fowler
- Denyce Graves
- Mary Gayle Greene
- John Osborn
- John Relyea
- Jennifer Rivera
- Cheryl Studer
- Fernando del Valle
- Delores Ziegler
