= Knoxville Opera =

Non-profit organization in the USA

The Knoxville Opera is an American opera company based in Knoxville, Tennessee. It was founded in 1978 as the Knoxville Civic Opera by Edward Zambara, who served as Artistic Director until 1981. The company changed its name and became an entirely professional opera company in 1983. Since 1981 the company has had three General Directors who also served as the Principal Conductor; Robert Lyall who served from 1982-1999, Francis Graffeo from 2000-2005, Brian Salesky from 2005-2022., and Jason Hardy from 2022 to present.

The 1978 inaugural performance of La Traviata included opera stars Delores Ziegler and Knoxville native Mary Costa, who garnered fame for creating the voice of Princess Aurora in the 1959 Disney film Sleeping Beauty. Notable appearances with the company include gala performances by Luciano Pavarotti, Marilyn Horne, Cheryl Studer and Catherine Malfitano, in addition to leading roles performed by Rosalind Elias, Mary Dunleavy, Faith Esham, Stella Zambalis, Jami Rogers-Anderson, Joyce El-Khoury, Talise Trevigne, Rachele Gilmore, Barbara Dever, Victoria Livengood, Enrico Di Giuseppe, Carl Tanner, Richard Troxell, David Keith, Robert Orth, Kevin Langan, Kevin Short, Kevin Burdette, Jan Opalach, Jeffrey Wells, Andrew Wentzel, and Zachary James. Directors who have appeared regularly with the company include James Marvel and Carroll Freeman, the latter having directed more than twenty-five operas with the company beginning with The Marriage of Figaro in 1996. Freeman also served as Artistic Director of the Knoxville Opera Studio at the University of Tennessee, a training program whose members often perform supporting roles with Knoxville Opera as part of their studies.

The company performs at the Tennessee Theatre. In 2011, the company celebrated the Tenth Anniversary of their Rossini Festival and Italian Street Fair in downtown Knoxville. In addition to food and crafts, the festival offers free open-air performances by members of the Knoxville Opera and UT Knoxville Opera Studio, drawing as many as 35,000 people.

In 2015 the company was the subject of national attention regarding a controversy over physical appearance in opera hiring practices. Knoxville Opera celebrated its fortieth anniversary in 2018 and plans to stage Nkeiru Okoye's opera Harriet Tubman in a 2020 revival of the 2014 American Opera Projects production.

== See also ==
- Knoxville Symphony Orchestra
