= Brian Salesky =

American conductor

Brian Salesky is an American conductor of operatic and orchestral music. A Phi Beta Kappa graduate of Indiana University, he also studied at The Juilliard School.

In the fall of 1978, Salesky first appeared at the New York City Opera, conducting Naughty Marietta. He went on to lead La traviata, Rigoletto (with Pablo Elvíra), Falstaff (with Donald Gramm and Muriel Costa-Greenspon, in Sarah Caldwell's production), the world premiere of Stanley Silverman's Madame Adare, Carmen, Les contes d'Hoffmann, etc., with the company. In 1980, the City Opera production of La cenerentola was televised over PBS, with Salesky leading Susanne Marsee, Rockwell Blake, and Alan Titus, to much acclaim.

In Europe, Salesky has conducted at Barcelona's Gran Teatre del Liceu (L'elisir d'amore, with Alfredo Kraus), and then led concerts with Kraus and Renata Scotto, in Madrid and Granada. Elsewhere, he has appeared with Opera Australia (Adriana Lecouvreur), the Spoleto Festival (Falstaff), Chicago Lyric Opera (Simon Boccanegra), Cincinnati Opera, Atlanta Opera, Dayton Opera, Knoxville Opera Company as well as the opera companies of Washington and Montana. He has also led many symphony orchestras.

On Broadway, Salesky conducted the revival of Man of La Mancha, with Raúl Juliá, in 1992. As of 2005, he is executive director and Conductor of the Knoxville Opera Company.

He attended the High School of Music & Art in Spanish Harlem, New York.
