= Jami Rogers-Anderson =

American soprano opera singer (born 1970)

- Born: Jami Rogers; September 2, 1970 (age 55); Knoxville, Tennessee, U.S.
- Occupations: Opera singer (soprano), teacher
- Years active: 1994–present

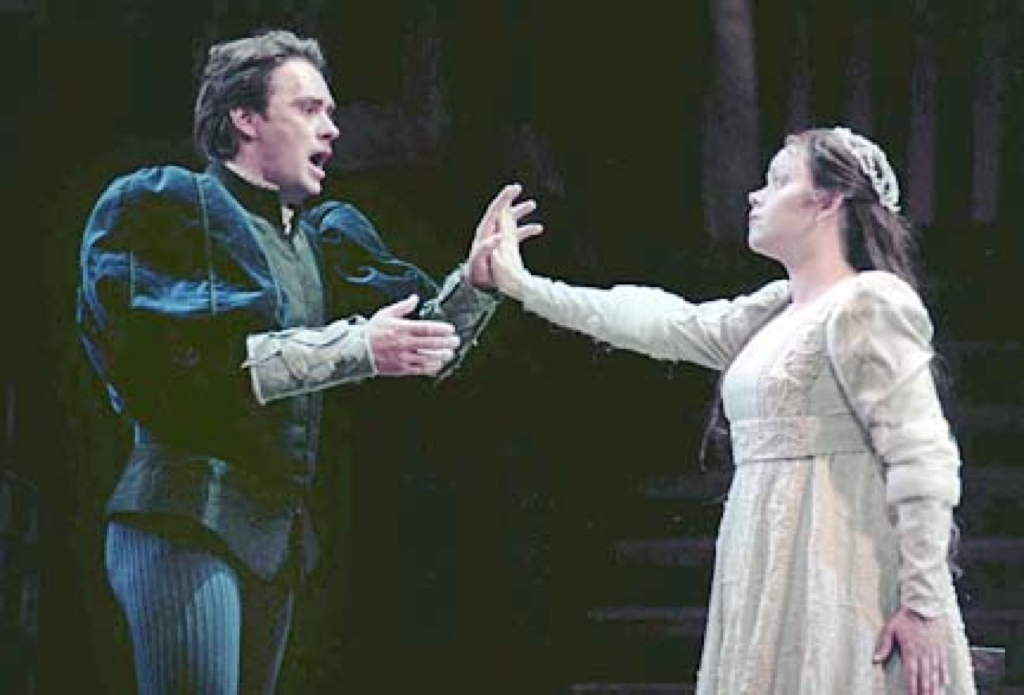

Jami Rogers-Anderson (born September 2, 1970) is an American soprano opera singer.

== Personal life ==
Jami Rogers was born in Knoxville, Tennessee, graduating from Tyson Middle School in 1984 and West High School in 1988. She earned a Bachelor of Music degree from Boston University, graduating magna cum laude while studying under Phyllis Curtin. Rogers married tenor Kevin Anderson. Her favorite composer is Olivier Messiaen, as she prefers to sing the works of 20th-century composers.

== Critical reception ==
Rogers-Anderson has been praised for a remarkably sweet singing voice and an impeccable coloratura line. She has performed extensively throughout the world, including in the United States, Canada, Europe and South America. Rogers-Anderson has performed numerous operas of Mozart, most notably as Queen of the Night in Mozart's The Magic Flute including productions with the New York City Opera, Santa Fe Opera and Opéra de Montréal. In Honolulu, she was commended for giving the best vocal performance in the production. In St. Petersburg, Florida Rogers-Anderson brought a thunderous reaction from the audience when she effortlessly hit F above high C. One critic described Rogers-Anderson as a charismatic soprano and an enchanting comic figure with an irresistible joie de vivre. However, The Wall Street Journal opera critic Heidi Waleson found Rogers-Anderson mechanical, while others have felt that she struggled on occasion.

== Appearances ==
Rogers-Anderson appeared in other Mozart operas playing Zerlina in Don Giovanni, Servilia in La clemenza di Tito, Susanna in The Marriage of Figaro and Aspasia in Mitridate, re di Ponto. She has additionally sung notable roles including Juliet in Gounod’s opera Roméo et Juliette, Adele in Strauss’ operetta Die Fledermaus and Sophie in Massenet’s opera Werther with both the Los Angeles Opera and the Boston Lyric Opera. She also appeared with New York’s Metropolitan Opera as Poucette in Manon.

Rogers-Anderson additionally appeared in The Barber of Seville, Rigoletto, La bohème, Candide, L'enfant et les sortilèges, The Tempest and countless other notable operas. On August 2, 4 and 6, 2006, she performed The Marriages of Mozart with the Boston Midsummer Opera, appearing in concert with her husband.

== Television and radio appearances ==
Rogers-Anderson appeared live on the PBS program Live from Lincoln Center during a telecast of the operetta Paul Bunyan. She was a soloist on National Public Radio’s live broadcast of Handel’s Messiah with the Atlanta Symphony Orchestra. She also recorded Elegy for Young Lovers in the role of Hilda Mack with Orchestre Philharmonique de Radio France in Paris.

== Knoxville, Tennessee performances ==
During the 1990s, Rogers-Anderson performed in her hometown with the Knoxville Opera Company as Josephine in the comic opera H.M.S. Pinafore and with the Knoxville City Ballet in the cantata Carmina Burana. On February 5, 2005, she appeared with her husband in the world premiere of Love Awakes Us in Knoxville. On April 19, 2008, she appeared with her husband again during Knoxville's Italian Street Fair. On September 24 and 25, 2009, Rogers-Anderson appeared with the Knoxville Symphony Orchestra in Samuel Barber's Knoxville: Summer of 1915. The text of both Love Awakes Us and Knoxville: Summer of 1915 is taken from the poetry of legendary Knoxville-born poet James Agee, after whom the music building at Rogers-Anderson's high school was named.

== Teaching and master classes ==
Rogers-Anderson returned to her alma mater Boston University as a teacher at the Tanglewood Institute. She also taught master classes at the State University of New York at Potsdam, University of North Carolina Wilmington, University of Southern Mississippi and Pellissippi State Community College in her hometown. Rogers-Anderson returned to Knoxville to teach music and still appears in singing roles.

== Awards ==
- 1995: winner of the Opera Index Awards
- 1996: National Winner of the Metropolitan Opera National Council Auditions
