= Tennessee Theatre =

- U.S. National Register of Historic Places
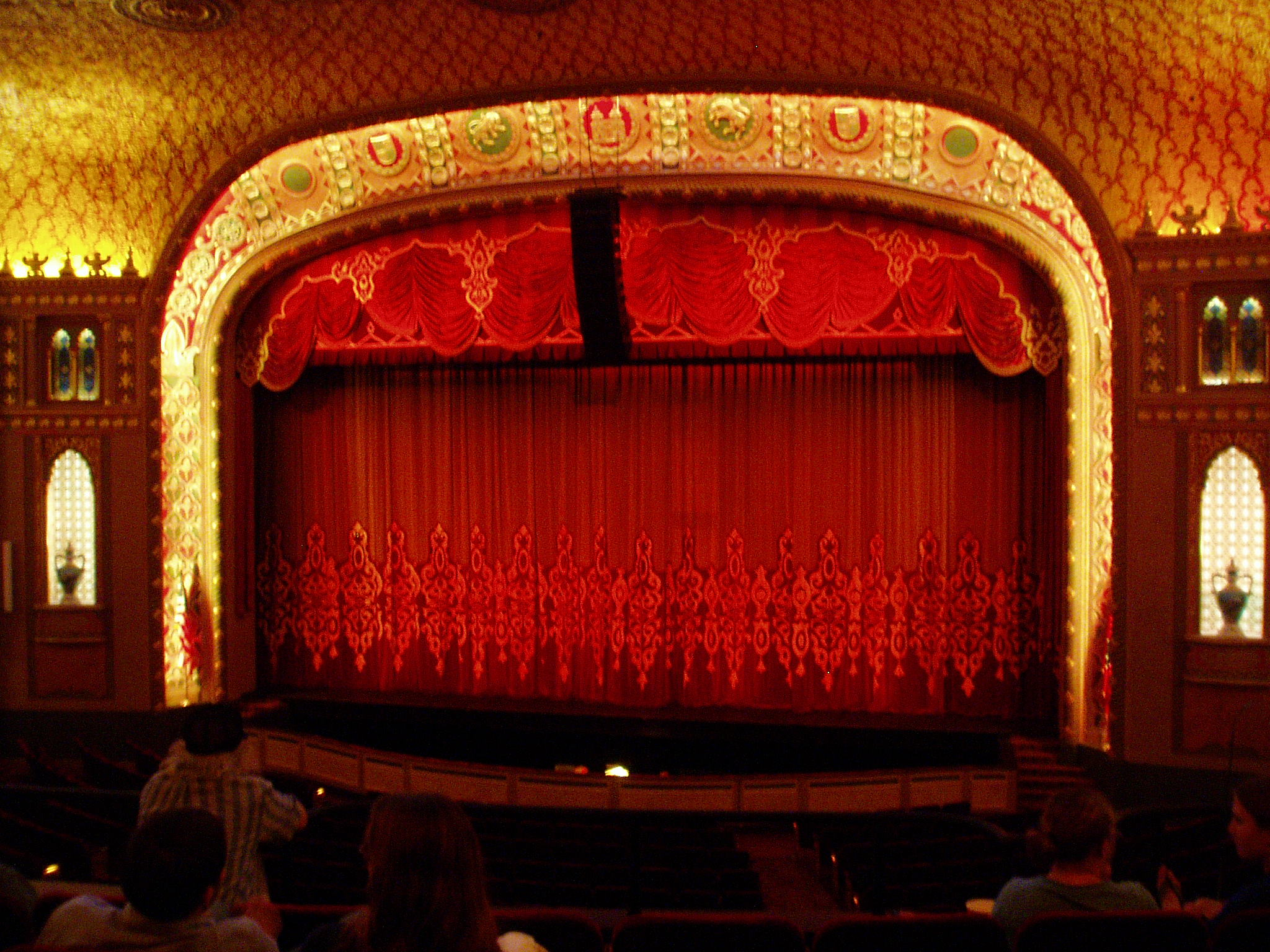
- Stage of the theatre in 2012
- Interactive map showing the location for Tennessee Theatre
- Location: 604 South Gay Street; Knoxville, Tennessee; 37902
- Coordinates: 35°57′44″N 83°55′10″W
- Built: October 1, 1928
- Architect: Graven & Mayger
- NRHP reference No.: 82003979
- Added to NRHP: April 1, 1982

The Tennessee Theatre is a movie palace in the downtown core of Knoxville, Tennessee, United States. The theater opened in 1928 in the 1908 Burwell Building, considered Knoxville's first skyscraper. The theater and Burwell Building were added to the National Register of Historic Places in 1982, and the theater was extensively restored in the early 2000s.

The Tennessee Theatre currently focuses on hosting performing arts events and classic films, and is home to the Knoxville Opera and the Knoxville Symphony Orchestra. The theater is managed by AC Entertainment.

== Performances ==
The Tennessee Theatre offers a wide range of performing arts events and classic films to the public. The theater is managed by AC Entertainment and is home to the Knoxville Opera, and the Knoxville Symphony Orchestra.

After the failed "Broadway in Knoxville" series at the Knoxville Civic Coliseum finally came to an end due to a lack of profit, quality 'Broadway-style' entertainment was transferred to the Tennessee Theatre for a 2008-2009 season. The series, now presented by the Tennessee Theatre, was renamed Broadway at the Tennessee and kicked off with Fred Ebb's Chicago. Productions at The Tennessee Theatre included Movin' Out, Hairspray, Jesus Christ Superstar, Sweeney Todd, and Stomp.

== History ==
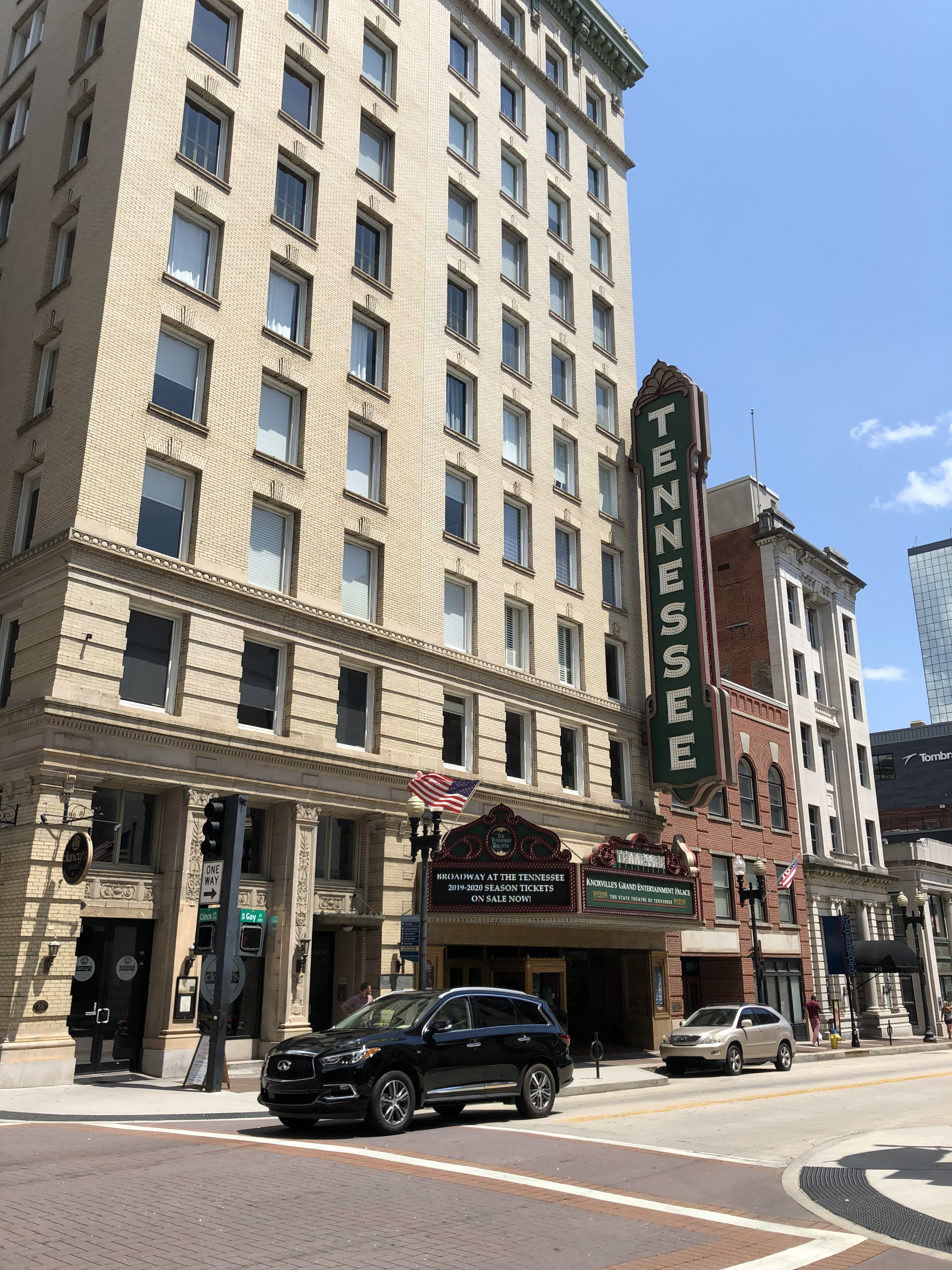
The Tennessee Theatre is inside the Burwell Building on South Gay Street, which hosts a large sign advertising the theatre

The Burwell Building was completed in 1908; the Tennessee Theatre was constructed inside it during 1927–1928.

The theater was designed by Chicago architects Graven & Mayger in the Spanish-Moorish style, although the design incorporates elements from all parts of the world: Czechoslovak crystals in the French-style chandeliers, Italian terrazzo flooring in the Grand Lobby, and Oriental influences in the carpet and drapery patterns. It was built by George A. Fuller, another Chicago native, who also built the Flatiron Building in New York City. By this point, the theater was turning out to be an almost all-Chicago project, and Fuller broke ground on November 1, 1927. On Christmas Day the News-Sentinel reported that the theater was pouring concrete.

The theater first opened on October 1, 1928, and with about 2,000 seats in the auditorium, it was billed as "Knoxville's Grand Entertainment Palace". The theater was one of the first public buildings in Knoxville to have air conditioning, and it also featured a Wurlitzer organ.

During its heyday, the theater played host to a few world movie premieres, including So This is Love (1953), and the adaptation of James Agee's All the Way Home (1963). After a refurbishment in 1966, the theater's seating capacity was reduced to 1,545.

The theater changed owners several times over its life, and eventually closed for the first time in 1977. Thereafter it was open and closed intermittently for the remainder of the late 1970s.

=== Restoration ===
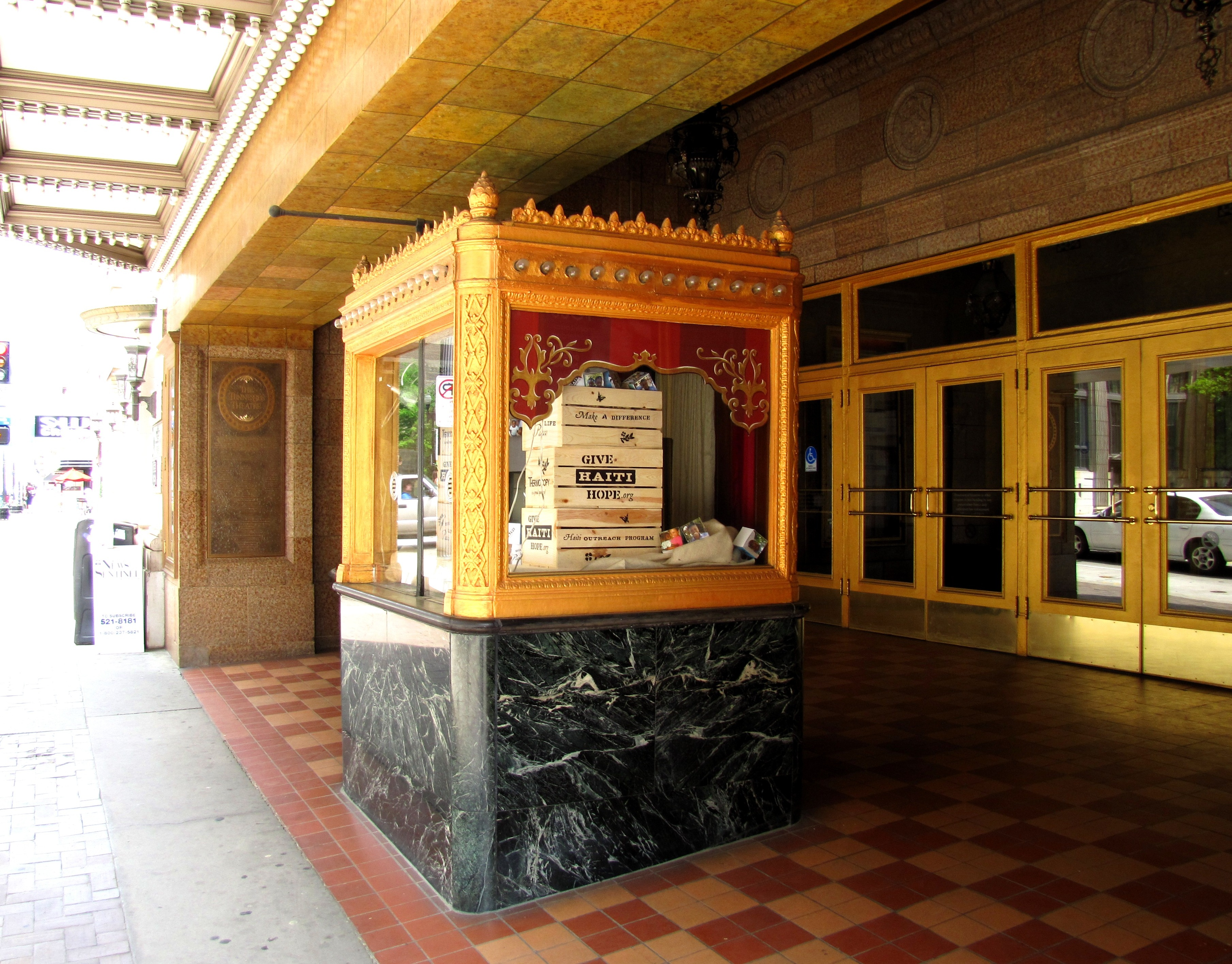
Box office at the building entrance along Gay Street

The theatre was purchased along with the building by local radio company Dick Broadcasting in 1981, who started a renovation effort to prepare it for the 1982 World's Fair. On April 1, 1982, the theater was placed in the National Register of Historic Places.

The Historic Tennessee Theatre Foundation was formed in 1996 and Dick Broadcasting donated the theater to the non-profit. It was designated "The Official State Theatre of Tennessee." In 2001, the Foundation announced a campaign to completely restore and renovate the theater. The $29.3 million project was funded through public and private donations with the help of $6.3 million in tax credits. The theater closed for renovations in June 2003 to completely restore it to its original state.

Renovations included expansions of the stage depth via a cantilever two stories above State street, which accommodated larger and more elaborate productions, a custom orchestra shell to enhance the acoustics of the new larger stage, an enlarged orchestra pit, upgraded dressing room facilities, modernization of the lighting, rigging, and other theatrical equipment, the installations of elevators, and a new marquee. The restorations included new carpets, draperies, and lighting fixtures that duplicated the original designs, and historically accurate restoration of all plaster and paint surfaces throughout the lobby, lounges, foyers, and the auditorium. Integration of acoustic treatments into the restored auditorium and lobby, and a substantially improved exterior sound isolation system were included in the restoration design. Seating capacity is now at 1,645 patrons. The design team for this renovation effort was led by McCarty Holsaple Architects of Knoxville, Tennessee and included Westlake Reed Leskosky Architects of Cleveland, Ohio (now DLR Group).

The theater reopened on January 14, 2005 and had a near sold-out season. In 2013 the Tennessee Theatre announced the sale of its one millionth ticket since the restoration.

== Mighty Wurlitzer ==
The Wurlitzer organ was installed in the Tennessee Theatre at the time of its opening in 1928. It was built by the Rudolph Wurlitzer Company in North Tonawanda, New York, and cost about $50,000 at the time.

The organist at the Tennessee is always advertised as the star of the show, and the first organist was Miss Jean Wilson, whose name appeared on the marquee alongside early films. Later House Organists include William T. Snyder and current performer Freddie Brabson.

In October 2000, virtually the entire organ was shipped to Reno, Nevada, to master organ rebuilder Ken Crome, who restored the instrument piece by piece. Artisans and craftsmen returned the organ's appearance to its original 1928 color scheme and design. The chambers on either side of the stage, which houses the pipes, were replastered to fully ensure the protection and preservation of the restored instrument.

The Wurlitzer returned to Knoxville in August 2001 and was re-installed over the course of the next month. Theater organist Lyn Larsen was involved in the configuration and tonal regulation of the organ, and was the first to publicly perform it at a gala concert on October 1, 2001.

== In popular culture ==
Portions of the 1999 film October Sky were filmed in and around Knoxville, and the facade of the theater can be seen during a scene in which the main characters go to the movies.

The 2017 film The Last Movie Star was mostly filmed in Knoxville. Several scenes were filmed inside the Tennessee Theatre grand lobby, portrayed as a fictional grand hotel lobby in the film.

== See also ==
- Bijou Theatre
- Staub's Theatre
- The Burwell
