= Delores Ziegler =

American mezzo-soprano (born 1951)

- Born: September 4, 1951 (age 73); Atlanta, US
- Education: Maryville College; University of Tennessee; Santa Fe Opera
- Occupations: Classical mezzo-soprano; Academic teacher
- Organizations: University of Maryland

Delores Ziegler (born September 4, 1951) is an American mezzo-soprano who has had an active international performance career since the late 1970s. A former resident artist at the Cologne Opera, she has performed leading roles with many of the world's best opera houses, including La Scala, the Lyric Opera of Chicago, the Metropolitan Opera, the San Francisco Opera, and the Vienna State Opera. She is currently a professor of voice at the University of Maryland. While she has performed a broad repertoire, she is widely admired for her performances in operas by Wolfgang Amadeus Mozart and Richard Strauss; particularly Cherubino in The Marriage of Figaro, Dorabella in Così fan tutte, Idamante in Idomeneo, and Octavian in Der Rosenkavalier.

== Life and career ==
Born in Atlanta, Ziegler earned a Bachelor of Music degree from Maryville College (1973) and a Master of Arts degree in vocal performance from the University of Tennessee where she was a pupil of Edward Zambara. After first performances in concert, she made her operatic debut as Flora in Verdi's La traviata in Oxfield, Tennessee in 1978. In 1979 she was a finalist in the Metropolitan Opera National Council Auditions. That same year she performed the role of Maddalena in Verdi's Rigoletto at the Opera Theatre of Saint Louis.

After an apprenticeship with the Santa Fe Opera, Ziegler went to Germany to pursue further studies in opera with bass-baritone Hans Hotter; making her European debut soon after at Theater Bonn in 1981 as Emilia in Verdi's Otello. This performance was followed by return engagements at that opera house as Dorabella in Mozart's Così fan tutte and Octavian in Strauss' Der Rosenkavalier. In 1982 she became a resident artist at the Cologne Opera where she achieved critical success as Cherubino in Mozart's The Marriage of Figaro in 1983, Prince Orlovsky in Die Fledermaus by Johann Strauss in 1985, and as Octavian. She married a fellow resident artist at the Cologne Opera, tenor Randall Outland.

Ziegler first appeared at the New York City Opera (NYCO) in the role of the composer in Ariadne auf Naxos by Richard Strauss in 1983. She has since returned to the NYCO as Rosina in Rossini's Barber of Seville (1984). Other engagements in the US and Canada soon followed, including performances at the San Diego Opera (1986) and the Canadian Opera Company (1987). In 1989 she portrayed Charlotte in Massenet's Werther at both the Michigan Opera Theatre and the Seattle Opera; later returning to the latter company in 1991 as Giovanna Seymour in Donnizetti's Anna Bolena.

In 1984 Ziegler made her debut at the Glyndebourne Festival Opera as Dorabella during the festival's 50th anniversary season; performed the role of Idamantes in Mozart's Idomeneo at the Mostly Mozart Festival; and made her debut at La Scala as Dorabella. She reprised the role of Idamante at several opera houses, including La Scala (1985), the Vienna State Opera (1987), and the Maggio Musicale Fiorentino (1989). Other major European engagements during the 1980s included performances at the Bavarian State Opera (debut 1984), the Salzburg Festival (1985, Sesto in Mozart's La clemenza di Tito), the Norwegian National Opera (1986), the Hamburg State Opera (1988), La Fenice (1989, Octavian), and a return to La Scala as Romeo in Bellini's I Capuleti e i Montecchi (1987).

In 1990 Ziegler returned to the Canadian Opera Company as Octavian and made her debut at the Metropolitan Opera as Siebel in Charles Gounod's Faust. She has since returned to the Met as Octavian (1991), as Dorabella (1991), as Cherubino (1995, 1999, 2002), as Rosina (1998), Flora in La traviata (1998), the Third Lady in The Magic Flute (1998), Hanna Glawari in The Merry Widow (2001), and Maria Bolkonskaya in the Met's first staging of Prokofiev's War and Peace (2002). In 1991 she made her debut at the San Francisco Opera as Bellini's Romeo and portrayed Dulcinee in Massenet's Don Quichotte at the Teatro Comunale, Florence.

In 1992 Ziegler was the mezzo soloist in Rossini's Stabat Mater with conductor Riccardo Muti and the Philadelphia Orchestra. In 1993 she made her debut at the Lyric Opera of Chicago as Dorabella to Carol Vaness' Fiordiligi. In 1994 she portrayed Rosina in The Barber of Seville at the Santa Fe Opera. In 1995 she appeared at the Schwetzingen Festival in Antonio Salieri's Falstaff. In 1998 she was a featured soloist in a concert of music by composer Ned Rorem at both the New York Festival of Song and at the Library of Congress; performed as the mezzo soloist in Johann Sebastian Bach's Mass in B minor at Carnegie Hall with Robert Shaw and the Atlanta Symphony Orchestra and Chamber Chorus; and portrayed Orfeo in Gluck's Orfeo ed Euridice at the Athens Concert Hall.

Ziegler performed Dorabella in a film version of Mozart's Così fan tutte directed by Jean-Pierre Ponnelle, conducted by Nikolaus Harnoncourt. She also recorded the part of Sara in Donizetti's Roberto Devereux, and Giovanna in his Anna Bolena alongside Edita Gruberová in the title role. She recorded the role of the Second Lady in Mozart's The Magic Flute with Harnoncourt leading the Zürich Opera Orchestra and Chorus in 1988.

Ziegler has been a professor of voice at School of Music at the University of Maryland.

== Selected recordings ==
Recordings of Delores Ziegler
| Title | Conductor / Choir / Orchestra | Soloists | Label | Year |
|---|---|---|---|---|
| Requiem by Mozart (contralto soloist) | Robert Shaw Atlanta Symphony Chorus Atlanta Symphony Orchestra | Arleen Auger; Jerry Hadley; Tom Krause | Telarc | 1986 |
| Mass in B minor by Bach (as Soprano II soloist) | Nikolaus Harnoncourt Arnold Schoenberg Choir Concentus Musicus Wien | Angela Maria Blasi; Jadwiga Rappé; Kurt Equiluz; Robert Holl | Teldec | 1986 |
| The Magic Flute by Mozart (as The Second Lady) | Nikolaus Harnoncourt Zürich Opera Orchestra and Chorus | Hans Peter Blochwitz; Barbara Bonney; Matti Salminen; Edita Gruberová; Anton Scharinger | Teldec | 1987 |
| Symphony No. 9 by Beethoven (alto soloist) | Riccardo Muti Westminster Symphonic Choir Philadelphia Orchestra | Cheryl Studer; Peter Seiffert; James Morris | EMI | 1988 |
| Mass in B minor by Bach (as Soprano II soloist) | Robert Shaw Atlanta Chamber Chorus Atlanta Symphony Orchestra | Sylvia McNair; Marietta Simpson; John Aler; William Stone | Telarc | 1990 |
| Così fan tutte by Mozart (as Dorabella) | Nikolaus Harnoncourt Vienna Philharmonic | Edita Gruberová; Teresa Stratas; Luis Lima; Ferruccio Furlanetto; Paolo Montarsolo | DG | |
| La clemenza di Tito by Mozart (as Annio) | Nikolaus Harnoncourt Zürich Opera Orchestra and Chorus | Philip Langridge; Lucia Popp; Ann Murray; Ruth Ziesak; László Polgár | Teldec | 1993 |
| Roberto Devereux by Donizetti (as Sara) | Friedrich Haider Choeurs de l'Opéra du Rhin Orchestre philharmonique de Strasbourg | Edita Gruberová; Don Bernardini; Ettore Kim | Nightingale Classics | 1994 (Live recording) |
| Anna Bolena by Donizetti (as Giovanna Seymour) | Elio Boncompagni Chorus and orchestra of the Hungarian Radio and Television | Edita Gruberová; Stefano Palatchi; José Bros | Nightingale Classics | 1994 (Live recording) |
