= Bijou Theatre (Knoxville, Tennessee) =

Theater in Knoxville, Tennessee, United States

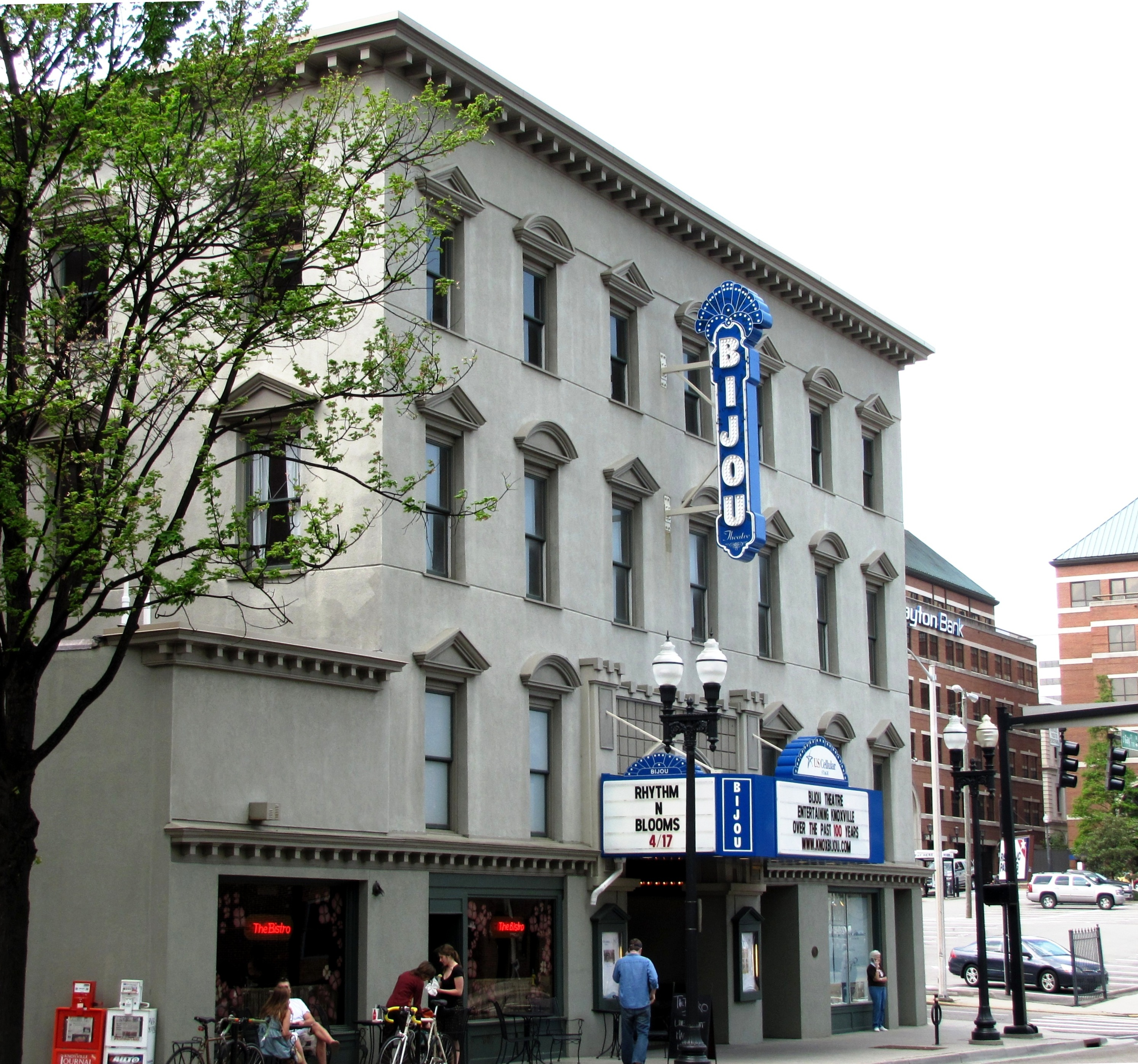
- Exterior view of the theatre (c.2010)
- Interactive map of Bijou Theatre
- Former names: Wells Auditorium (planning/construction); Wells Bijou Theatre (1909-35); Bijou Art Theatre (1935-75)
- Address: 803 S Gay St; Knoxville, TN 37902-1711
- Location: Downtown Knoxville
- Coordinates: 35°57′44″N 83°55′0″W
- Owner: Bijou Theatre Foundation
- Operator: AC Entertainment
- Capacity: 757

Construction
- Groundbreaking: May 1908
- Opened: March 8, 1909
- Closed: 1975-2005
- Cost: $150,000 ($5.38 million in 2025 dollars)
- Architect: Oakley of Montgomery
- General contractors: Thomas and Turner, Inc.

Website
- Venue Website
- Lamar House Hotel-Bijou Theatre
- U.S. National Register of Historic Places
- Built: 1817, 1909
- Architectural style: Federal; Georgian
- NRHP reference No.: 75001763
- Added to NRHP: December 4, 1975

The Bijou Theatre is a theater located in Knoxville, Tennessee, United States. Built in 1909 as an addition to the Lamar House Hotel, the theater has at various times served as performance venue for traditional theatre, vaudeville, a second-run moviehouse, a commencement stage for the city's African-American high school, and a pornographic movie theater. The Lamar House Hotel, in which the theater was constructed, was originally built in 1817, and modified in the 1850s. The building and theater were added to the National Register of Historic Places in 1975.

The Lamar House Hotel was built by Irish immigrant Thomas Humes (1767–1816) and his descendants, and quickly developed into a gathering place for Knoxville's wealthy. In 1819, Andrew Jackson became the first of five presidents to lodge at the hotel, and in the early 1850s, local businessmen purchased and expanded the building into a lavish 75-room complex. During the Civil War, the Union Army used the hotel as a hospital for its war wounded, among them General William P. Sanders, who died at the hotel in 1863. Following the war, the hotel became the center of Knoxville's Gilded Age extravagance, hosting lavish masquerade balls for the city's elite.

In 1909, the rear wing of the building was replaced by the Bijou Theatre structure, entered through a new lobby cut through the hotel building from Gay Street. The theater opened on March 8, 1909, and over the next four decades would host performers such as the Marx Brothers, Dizzy Gillespie, John Philip Sousa, the Ballets Russes, Ethel Barrymore, Alfred Lunt and Lynn Fontanne, John Cullum, and Houdini. After a period of decline in the 1960s and early 1970s, local preservationists purchased the building and renovated the theater.

== Design ==
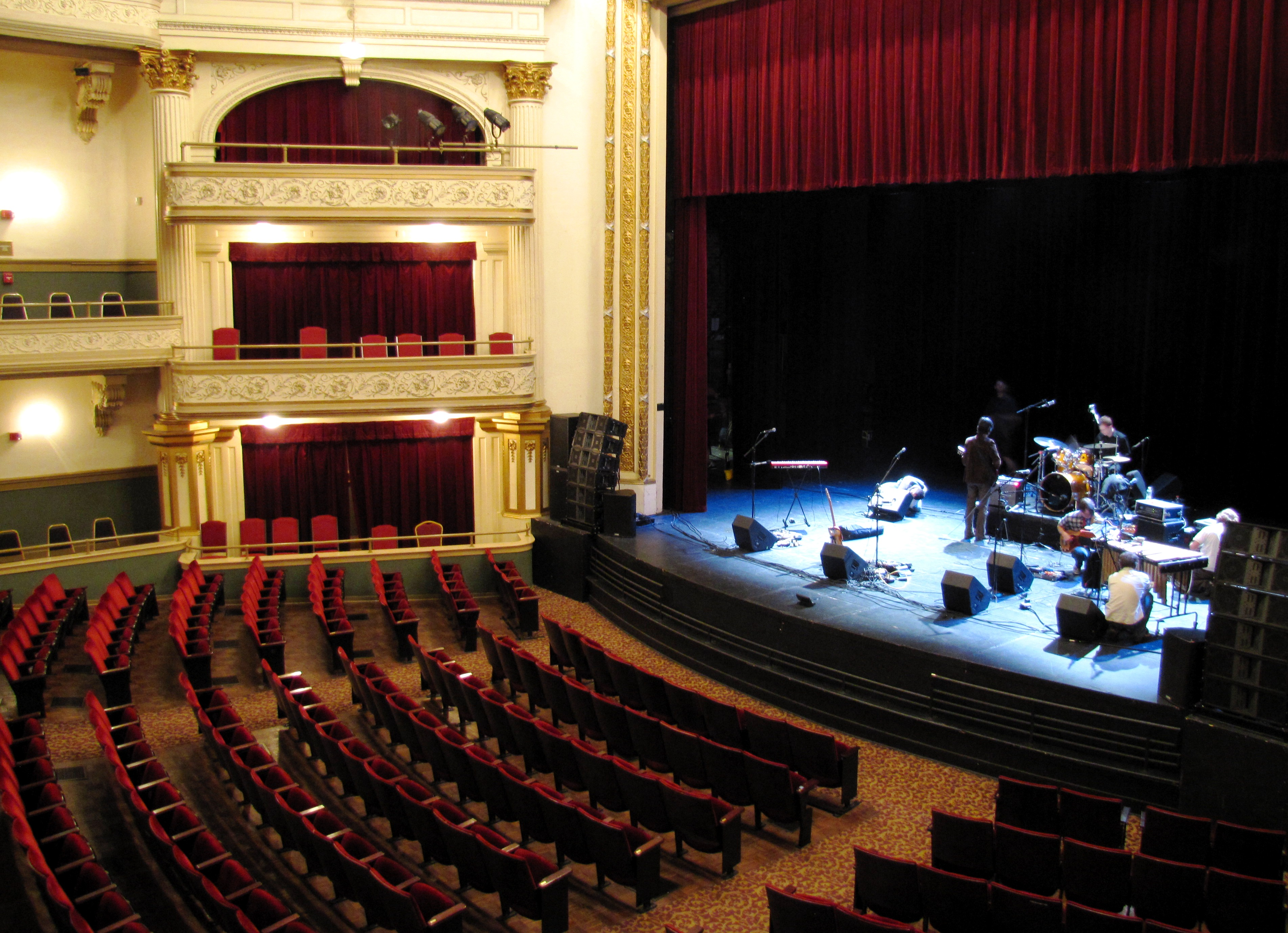
The Bijou orchestra floor, boxes, and stage, viewed from the upper right loggia

The Bijou Theatre building consists of two parts— the original hotel section, completed in 1817, and the rear theater section, built in 1909. The main entrance opens into a foyer, from which the rear theater section and the building's front corner wings are accessed (the south corner wing is occupied by a restaurant, The Bistro). From the foyer, the rear entrance opens into a bar, with passageways to the left and right leading to the theater's orchestra floor, and stairways to the left and right accessing the theater's balconies and the original building's second floor (now offices for the theater).

The building's facade was probably designed in the Georgian style, but its original appearance was extensively altered in the 1850s. Many of these alterations resulted from the macadamizing of Gay Street in 1854. The grading of the street during this period exposed the hotel's cellar, which was subsequently converted into the main entrance.

The theater has a capacity of approximately 700, with two balcony levels. There are two loggia levels and three box levels on each side of the building. The stage is 35 feet (11 m) deep and 69 feet (21 m) wide. The theater is decorated with notable Classical Revival elements, which include Corinthian columns supporting the box levels, reclining muse pediments above the top box levels, and grape-and-vine motifs adorning the front of the boxes and balconies.

== History ==
=== Early history ===
The Bijou stands on Lot 38 of the original survey of Knoxville drawn by Charles McClung in 1791. Thomas Humes, who operated a nearby store on Gay Street, purchased parts of the lot in 1801 and 1805. In 1816, Humes began building the three-story structure on the lot that he planned to operate as a tavern and hotel, but died before the building was completed. Humes's widow, Margaret Russell Cowan, continued construction, however, and the "Knoxville Hotel" opened sometime around July 1817.

The hotel was initially managed by a local tavern owner named Archibald Rhea, and was advertised as the largest in East Tennessee. The three-story hotel featured 13 rooms, a saloon, dining room, and had its own granary and stables. Throughout much of the 1820s and 1830s, the hotel was managed by a local hotelier named Joseph Jackson, and developed into a popular gathering place for the city's elite. Humes's children sold the hotel in 1837 to John Pickett and William Belden, who rechristened it the "City Hotel." During this period, each room in the hotel contained two feather beds, a table and chairs, and a washstand and looking glass. The hotel also had its own library, a lounge with a piano, and a dining room that served meals on silver plates and china.

=== Lamar House and the Civil War ===
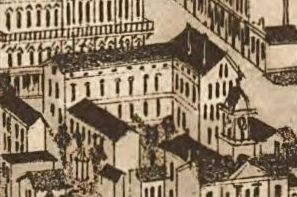
The Lamar House on an 1886 map of Knoxville, showing the original section (facing Gay Street, on the right), and the two early-1850s ell wings

In 1852, Knoxville banker William M. Churchwell purchased the hotel, and closed it in order to carry out renovations. Churchwell added a 100-foot (30 m) by 35-foot (11 m) ell overlooking Cumberland Street, expanding the hotel's capacity to 75, and then added a second ell to the first to serve as the hotel's kitchen, laundry and dining hall/ballroom. The hotel reopened under the name "Coleman House" in 1854, but in 1856 it was renamed "Lamar House" after investor Gazaway Bugg Lamar. That same year, Churchwell was forced to sell the hotel to William H. Sneed to cover bank debts.

In the months leading up to the Civil War, the Lamar House was favored by the city's secessionist leaders (Sneed himself was a staunch secessionist). District Attorney J. C. Ramsey, who ruthlessly prosecuted the city's Unionists during the war, listed the hotel as his business address. In October 1860, ex-Congressman John H. Crozier delivered a pro-secession speech in front of the hotel in which he called the city's pro-Union newspaperman, Parson Brownlow, a "coward." During the Confederate Army's occupation of Knoxville (1861–1863), Confederate officers boarded at the Lamar House.

When the Union Army took control of Knoxville in September 1863, the Lamar House was converted into a hospital. General William P. Sanders died in the hotel's bridal suite from wounds suffered during the Knoxville Campaign on November 19, 1863. His death was kept secret throughout the two-week Siege of Knoxville for fear it would demoralize Union soldiers. After the war, Parson Brownlow filed a lawsuit against Sneed and other ex-Confederates, demanding their property be confiscated. By 1866, however, Sneed had regained control of the hotel.

=== Gilded Age and decline ===
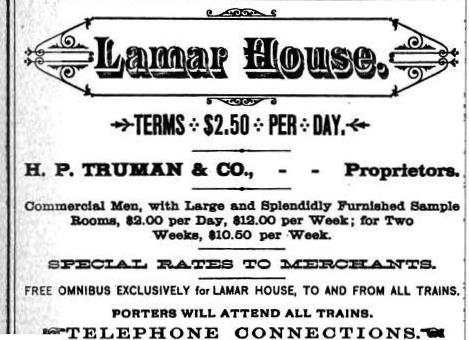
Lamar House advertisement, 1884

After Sneed died in 1869, his children inherited the Lamar House, and over the next two decades, the hotel once again developed into the preferred gathering place for Knoxville's elite. The hotel's status was enhanced by the construction of Staub's Theatre— Knoxville's first opera house— across the street in 1872. Masquerade balls were held regularly in the hotel's ballroom, with cigars, imported wines, and oysters served. Frequent attendees included author Frances Hodgson Burnett (whose brother worked as a bartender at the hotel) and artist Lloyd Branson. President Rutherford B. Hayes stayed at the hotel during his visit to Knoxville in September 1877. General James Holt Clanton died at the Lamar House on September 27, 1871, after being wounded in a shootout with attorney David Nelson.

In the 1890s, Knoxville's business focus shifted to the Southern Railroad area toward the north end of Gay Street, and the Lamar Hotel began to decline. Sneed's heirs sold the hotel in 1895, and over the next decade, the hotel shifted through six different owners and various new names before being purchased by the Auditorium Company for the construction of the Bijou in 1908. The hotel was known as "Hotel Le Conte" from 1930 until the 1950s, and was called "Hotel Lamarr" in the 1960s. By 1969, the hotel had become notorious for prostitution, and the city ordered it closed.

=== Bijou Theatre ===
The Auditorium Company, headed by businessman C. B. Atkin and theater manager Jake Wells, purchased the hotel in 1908 with the intention of adding a theater. The hotel's ell wings were torn down, and the brick theater wing was built in their place, with entrances added to the hotel's lobby. The theater, built at a cost of $50,000, originally had a capacity of 1,500, and featured electric lighting. The theater's backstage was equipped with a two-story scene dock and an Otis elevator to move sets.

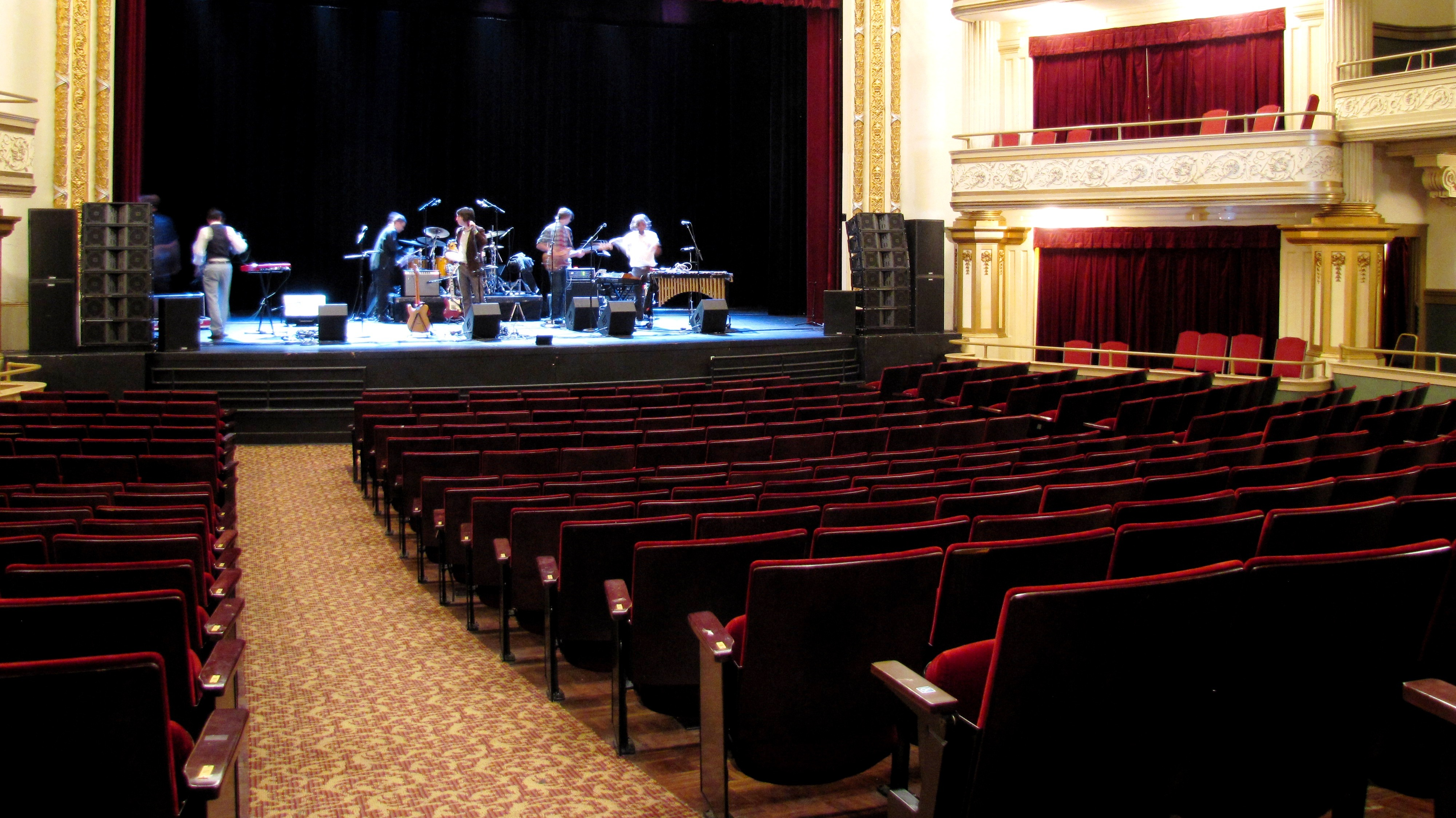
Orchestra floor, looking toward the stage

On March 8, 1909, the theater's opening night production of George Cohan's Little Johnny Jones was viewed by a sold-out audience. Traditional theater played a major role in the Bijou's early success, with performances that included Mr. Green's Reception, which starred the Marx Brothers. Between 1914 and 1921, B. F. Keith's company managed the Bijou, and vaudeville became the theater's primary attraction. While African-Americans were only allowed in the theater's gallery (now the upper balcony) on main performance nights, Knoxville Colored High School used the theater for commencement ceremonies in the 1910s, and Knoxville College performed plays at the theater.

Performers at the Bijou during the 1920s included John Philip Sousa and his band, Anna Pavlova and the Ballet Russe, and magician Harry Blackstone. In 1935, Kincy Theaters purchased the Bijou for use as a second-run moviehouse (the Tennessee Theatre, which opened in 1928, was Knoxville's first-run moviehouse). Live performances continued, however, among them Dorothy Gish in Life with Father in 1941, Lunt and Fontanne in Robert Sherwood's There Shall Be No Night in 1941, and Ethel Barrymore in Emlyn Williams's The Corn Is Green in 1943. The Knoxville Symphony Orchestra used the Bijou for its performances between 1936 and 1941.

=== Restoration ===
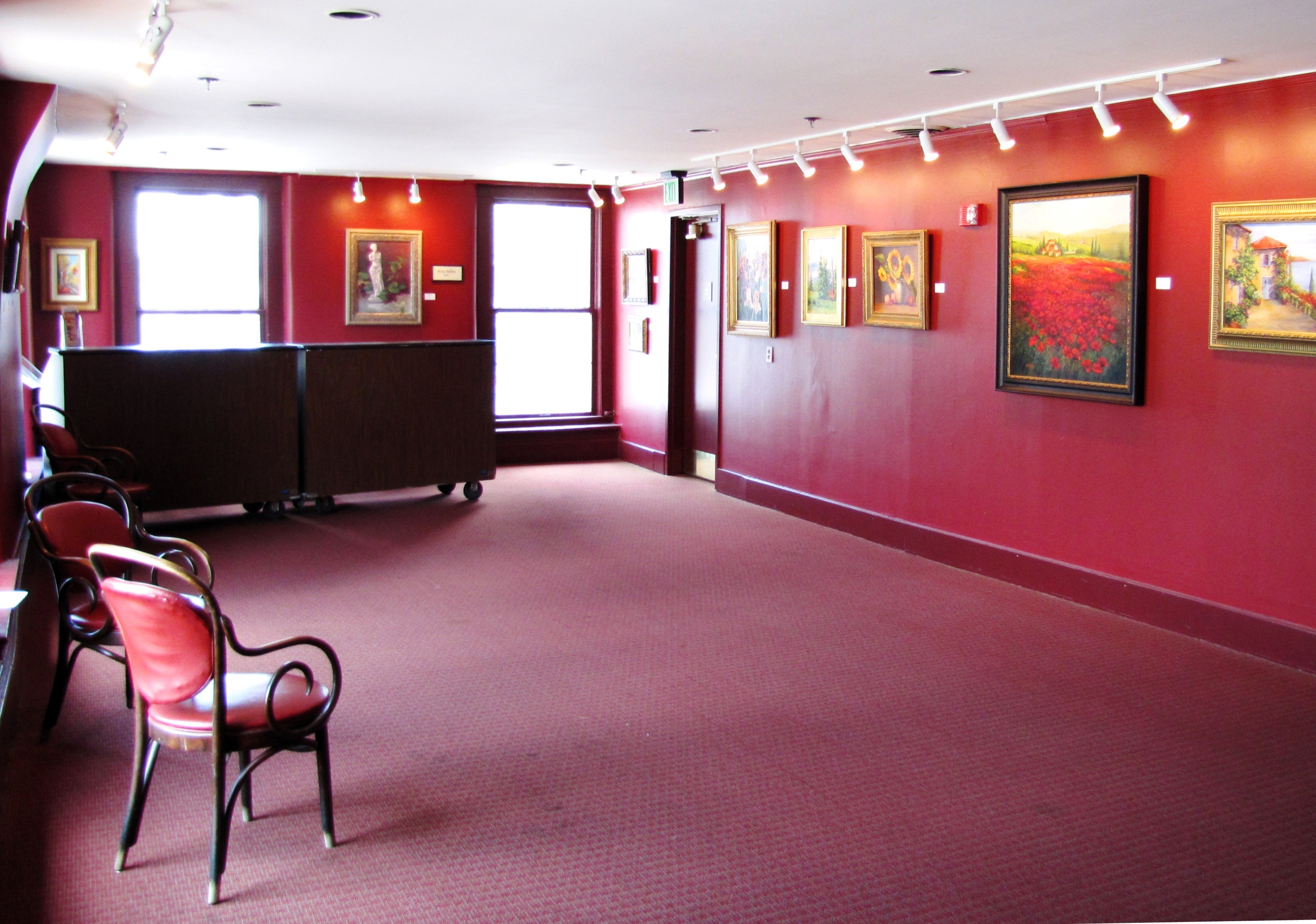
Gallery on the second floor of the original hotel section

By the late 1960s and early 1970s, Knoxville's downtown area had deteriorated, and various companies were using the Bijou to show pornographic movies. In 1974, after its owner was evicted for unpaid property taxes, the building was threatened with demolition, and a group of concerned citizens (the forerunner of Knox Heritage) organized a successful campaign to save the building. The theater was renovated as a center for the performing arts. Another partial renovation followed 20 years later, but funding remained a problem, and maintenance suffered. By 2005, the theater was in danger of defaulting on its mortgage, and was saved once again by two Knoxville businessmen, who held off foreclosure while the loan was renegotiated. After a fundraising campaign spearheaded by Knoxville Mayor Bill Haslam and the award of a federal grant, another renovation followed, repairing water damage, renovating the theater seats, and upgrading the stage with modern lighting, sound, and fly equipment.
