= Alessandro Corbelli =

Italian operatic baritone

Alessandro Corbelli (born September 21, 1952) is an Italian operatic baritone. One of the world's pre-eminent singers specializing in Mozart and Rossini, Corbelli has sung in many major opera houses around the world and won admiration for his elegant singing style and sharp characterizations, especially in comic roles.

== Career and roles ==
Corbelli was born in Turin, Italy in 1952 and studied with Giuseppe Valdengo and Claude Thiolas. He made his debut in 1973 (at the age of twenty-one) in Aosta, Italy as Monterone in Verdi's Rigoletto. Subsequently, he appeared at La Scala in Milan (singing in all three of the Mozart/Da Ponte operas under conductor Riccardo Muti), and also in such cities as Turin, Verona, Bologna, Florence, and Naples, as well as major opera houses in Switzerland, France, Austria, Germany, England, Spain, Israel, and North and South America. At the beginning of his career Corbelli sang lyric baritone roles, but his natural talent for comedy caused him eventually to be typecast in comic parts. Among the buffo roles he has performed and/or recorded are Dr. Bartolo in Rossini's Il barbiere di Siviglia, Taddeo in Rossini's L'italiana in Algeri, Don Geronio in Rossini's Il turco in Italia, Dr Dulcamara in Donizetti's L'elisir d'amore, and the title role of Donizetti's Don Pasquale. He has frequently showed his versatility by singing two roles from the same opera: Figaro and the Count in Mozart's Le nozze di Figaro, Leporello and the title role in Mozart's Don Giovanni, Guglielmo and Don Alfonso in Mozart's Così fan tutte, and Dandini and Don Magnifico in Rossini's La Cenerentola, among others.

At the Royal Opera House, as of March 2012, Corbelli had taken part in 87 performances since his debut in 1988 (as Taddeo in L'Italiana in Algeri). Corbelli's roles at the Royal Opera House have included Don Alfonso in Così fan tutte (8 perf., 1997), Doctor Malatesta in Don Pasquale (8 perf., 2004; 5 perf. 2006), Don Magnifico in La Cenerentola (10 perf. 2007–2008), Doctor Bartolo in Il barbiere di Siviglia (6 perf., 2009), and Michonnet in Adriana Lecouvreur (8 perf., 2010).

At the Metropolitan Opera House in New York, Corbelli performed 64 times, as of March 2012, since his debut in 1997, appearing 26 times as Dandini, 7 times as Dulcamara in L'elisir d'amore, 15 times in the title role of Gianni Schicchi, 8 times as Sergeant Sulpice in La Fille du Regiment, and 8 times as Taddeo in L'Italiana in Algeri.

Although primarily associated with Italian-language comic roles, Corbelli's résumé shows his wide-ranging interests and versatility, including French and German roles (Sulpice in Donizetti's La fille du regiment, Papageno in Mozart's Die Zauberflöte), Baroque opera (Seneca in Monteverdi’s L'incoronazione di Poppea) and a twentieth-century English-language opera (Nick Shadow in Stravinsky’s The Rake's Progress). He has also sung roles in later Italian comic operas, for instance the title roles in Verdi's Falstaff and Puccini's Gianni Schicchi. He is active in the concert hall as well, performing as a soloist in oratorios and vocal symphonies.

On 26 November 2007, while in London rehearsing for La Cenerentola, Corbelli stepped in at the last minute for a production of L'elisir d'amore at the Royal Opera House, singing the role of Belcore for the second half of the opera from the side of the stage while Ludovic Tézier, who had sung the first half with a throat infection, acted the role.

== Vocal style ==
Although in recent years Corbelli has sometimes been billed as a bass-baritone, he has insisted that he is a baritone. Corbelli's voice is not large, but its dark coloring gives it power and heft. He possesses a tight vibrato and great flexibility in coloratura and patter. His diction is razor-sharp and he points up the text effectively, particularly in recitatives. His stage presence is commanding and he excels in comic timing and subtle characterization.

== Roles ==
- Daniel-François-Esprit Auber
  - Fra Diavolo (Signore Rocburg)
- Luigi Cherubini
  - Lodoïska (Varbel)
- Francesco Cilea
  - Adriana Lecouvreur (Michonnet)
- Gaetano Donizetti
  - L'ajo nell'imbarazzo (Marchese Don Giulio Antiquati)
  - Don Pasquale (Don Pasquale, Dottor Malatesta)
  - Rita (Gasparo)
  - Linda di Chamounix (Marchese de Boisfleury)
  - L'elisir d'amore (Belcore, Dulcamara)
  - Roberto Devereux (Duca di Nottingham)
- Umberto Giordano
  - Fedora (De Siriex)
- Ruggero Leoncavallo
  - Pagliacci (Silvio)
- Claudio Monteverdi
  - L'Orfeo (Ottone)
- Wolfgang Amadeus Mozart
  - Così fan tutte (Guglielmo, Don Alfonso)
  - Don Giovanni (Don Giovanni, Leporello)
  - Le nozze di Figaro (Figaro, Conte di Almaviva)
  - The Magic Flute (Papageno)
- Giovanni Paisiello
  - Il barbiere di Siviglia (Figaro)
- Giovanni Battista Pergolesi
  - Lo frate 'nnamorato (Marcaniello)
- Niccolò Piccinni
  - La buona figliuola (Mengotto)
- Francis Poulenc
  - Les dialogues des Carmélites (Le Marquis de la Force)
- Giacomo Puccini
  - Turandot (Ping)
  - Madama Butterfly (Sharpless)
  - La bohème (Marcello)
  - Gianni Schicchi (Gianni Schicchi)
- Luigi Ricci
  - Crispino e la comare (Fabrizio)
- Gioachino Rossini
  - Il barbiere di Siviglia (Bartolo, Figaro)
  - La Cenerentola (Alidoro, Dandini, Don Magnifico)
  - Le Comte Ory (Raimbaud)
  - L'Italiana in Algeri (Haly, Taddeo)
  - L'occasione fa il ladro (Martino)
  - La pietra del paragone (Pacuvio)
  - La scala di seta (Germano)
  - Il signor Bruschino (Gaudenzio)
  - Il turco in Italia (Prosdocimo, Geronio)
- Johann Strauss II
  - Die Fledermaus (Gabriel von Eisenstein)
- Igor Stravinsky
  - The Rake's Progress (Nick Shadow)
- Tommaso Traetta
  - Le serve rivali (Don Grillo)
- Giuseppe Verdi
  - Falstaff (Ford, Sir John Falstaff)
