= Ugo Benelli =

Italian operatic tenor

Ugo Benelli (born 20 January 1935) is an Italian operatic tenor. Born in Genoa and trained at La Scala, Benelli had an international career singing leading tenore di grazia roles from the early 1960s through the 1980s. In his later years he sang character roles and began a career as a singing teacher. He retired from the stage in 2004.

== Life and career ==
Benelli was born in Genoa where his father and grandfather worked as hat makers. He studied singing in Milan with Pietro Magenta and then won a scholarship to La Scala's training school for young singers, where he studied under Giulio Confalonieri and Ettore Campogalliani. He began his singing career in Montevideo in 1958 in Salieri's comic intermezzo Arlecchinata while on a tour of Latin America with the chamber opera company Opera da Camera di Milano. In 1960 he began singing at the Teatro della Piccola Scala (La Scala's chamber theatre) and then at Barcelona's Gran Teatre del Liceu as Fenton in Verdi's Falstaff, which he considers to be his official debut.

He was then engaged to sing on the main stage at La Scala, first in the small role of Brighella in Ariadne auf Naxos in 1963, and then in the leading role of Giocondo in La pietra del paragone in the 1967 season. He returned to La Scala in 13 more productions between 1967 and 1999, as well as giving a solo concert of bel canto tenor arias in 1976 with Pierluigi Urbini conducting the La Scala Orchestra.

Benelli went on to make house debuts at a number of other major European and North American opera houses and festivals, including the Glyndebourne Festival, where he made his debut in 1967 as Nemorino in L'elisir d'amore and returned in subsequent years as Narciso in Il turco in Italia (1970), Count Almaviva in The Barber of Seville and Trouffaldino in The Love for Three Oranges (1982), and Don Basilio in The Marriage of Figaro (1984). In addition to his Glyndebourne debut, 1967 saw Benelli's house debuts at La Fenice as Filipeto in I quatro rusteghi and the Teatro di San Carlo as Nemorino in L'elisir d'amore.

=== Royal Opera House ===
When Benelli made his debut at London's Royal Opera House singing Ernesto in Don Pasquale in 1974, the English critic Harold Rosenthal wrote, "Mr Benelli's Ernesto was the best I remember in the theatre, and except for the classic Tito Schipa performance on records, the best sung I have ever heard." Benelli had been singing the role from the earliest days of his career. He sang it in Costa Rica during the 1958 Latin American tour and recorded it for Deutsche Grammophon in 1965.

=== Wexford Festival Opera ===
Benelli's long association with Wexford Festival Opera began in 1965 as Belfiore in La finta giardiniera. He returned the following year to sing the title role in Auber's Fra Diavolo and went on to sing Nencio in L'infedeltà delusa (1969), Bertrando in L'inganno felice (1970), Ernesto in Il giovedì grasso (1970), Ecclitico in Il mondo della luna (1978), and a series of celebrity recitals in the 1980s. He returned once more to the festival in 1998 to give the Tom Walsh Memorial Lecture. His subject was the tenore di grazia.

In the mid-1980s Benelli moved to singing character and buffo tenor roles. These included Don Basilio in The Marriage of Figaro, which he sang at Glyndebourne, the Salzburg Festival, the Maggio Musicale Fiorentino, and at the Metropolitan Opera for his house debut in 1986; Guillot de Morfontaine in Manon at La Scala and the Teatro Carlo Felice; Sendorf in The Makropulos Affair at the Teatro San Carlo; John Styx in Orpheus in the Underworld at the Teatro Regio in Turin, and Jack O'Brien in Rise and Fall of the City of Mahagonny at the Teatro Carlo Felice.

== Roles created ==
Early in his career Benelli created roles in two 20th-century operas:

- Dubut in Franco Mannino's Il diavolo in giardino (Teatro Massimo, Palermo, 28 February 1963)
- Commediante in Gian Francesco Malipiero's Le metamorfosi di Bonaventura (La Fenice, Venice, 4 September 1966)

== Recordings ==
Operas

- Rossini: La Cenerentola (as Don Ramiro). Orchestra of the Maggio Musicale Fiorentino, Oliviero De Fabritiis (conductor), 1964. Label: Decca
- Rossini: The Barber of Seville (as Count Almaviva). Orchestra Rossini di Napoli, Silvio Varviso (conductor), 1965. Label: Decca
- Leoncavallo: Pagliacci (as Beppe). La Scala Orchestra and Chorus, Herbert von Karajan (conductor), 1965. Label:Deutsche Grammophon
- Donizetti: Don Pasquale (as Ernesto). Orchestra of the Maggio Musicale Fiorentino, Ettore Gracis (conductor), 1965. Label: Deutsche Grammophon
- Boccherini: La Clementina (as Don Urbano). Radiotelevisione Svizzera Orchestra, Angelo Ephrikian (conductor), recorded 1965, released 1999. Label: Nuova Era
- Rota: Il cappello di paglia di Firenze (as Fadinard). Orchestra Sinfonica di Roma, Nino Rota (conductor), 1975. Label RCA Red Seal
- Rossini: Elisabetta, regina d'Inghilterra (as the Duke Norfolk). London Symphony Orchestra, Gianfranco Masini (conductor), 1976. Label: Philips
- Piccinni: La buona figliola (as the Marchese di Conchiglia). Orchestra del Teatro dell'Opera di Roma, Gianluigi Gelmetti (conductor), 1981. Label: Fonit Cetra
- Meyerbeer: Il crociato in Egitto (as Osmino). Royal Philharmonic Orchestra, David Parry (conductor), 1991. Label: Opera Rara

Masses

- Mozart: Requiem Mass in D minor (as tenor soloist). Vienna State Opera Orchestra and Chorus, István Kertész (conductor), 1966. Label: Decca
- Rossini: Messa di Gloria (as tenor soloist). English Chamber Orchestra, Herbert Handt (conductor), 1973. Label: Philips

== Retirement ==
Since his retirement from the stage, Benelli has taught singing privately and in master classes. In 2002, Giorgio De Martino's biography of him, Cantanti, vil razza dannata, was published by Zecchini in their series I racconti della musica. His last appearance onstage, in a praised "cameo" as Don Basilio, took place at the Teatro Carlo Felice in his native city in 2004, when he was 69.
