= Knoxville Symphony Orchestra =

Orchestra in Knoxville, Tennessee

- Orchestra
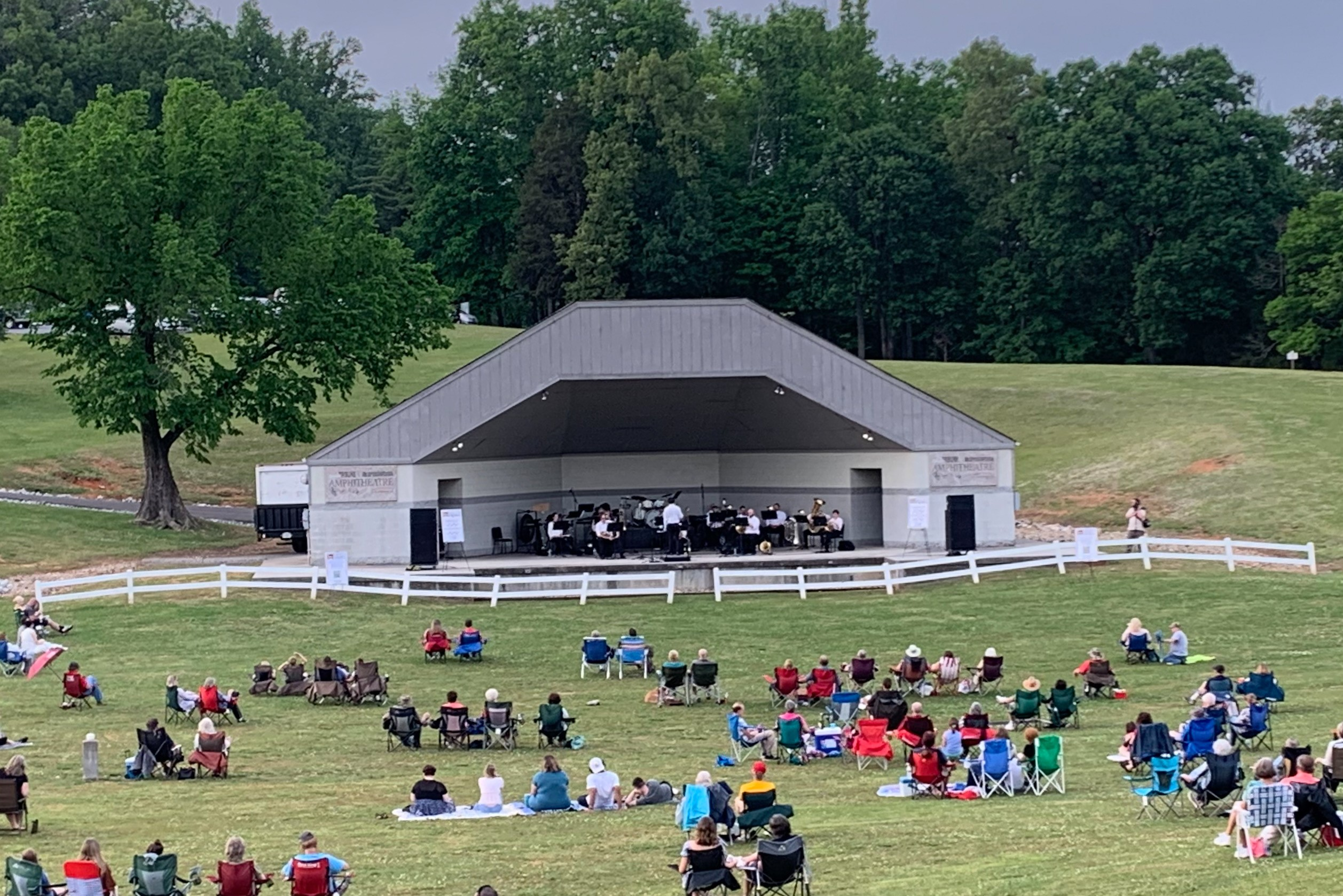
- Knoxville Symphony Orchestra performing at Cherokee Park in Morristown, Tennessee, circa May 2021
- Founded: 1935
- Location: Knoxville, Tennessee, U.S.
- Concert hall: Tennessee Theatre; Bijou Theatre; Knoxville Civic Auditorium
- Principal conductor: Aram Demirjian
- Website: knoxvillesymphony.com

The Knoxville Symphony Orchestra is a professional orchestra in Knoxville, Tennessee. The KSO was selected among a competitive pool of orchestras in 2020 to perform at the Kennedy Center as part of the SHIFT Festival of American Orchestras.

The orchestra was established in 1935 and is the second oldest continuing orchestra in the southeastern United States, behind the Charlotte Symphony Orchestra. The founding conductor was Bertha Walburn Clark, who led the group until 1946. Other former conductors were Lamar Stringfield (1946-1947 season), David Van Vactor (1947 to 1972), Arpad Joó (1973–1978), Zoltán Rozsnyai (1978–1985), Kirk Trevor (1985–2003), and Lucas Richman (2003–2015). The KSO has been led by Music Director Aram Demirjian since 2016.

Underneath the KSO umbrella, a youth orchestra was established in 1975, known as the Knoxville Symphony Youth Orchestra (KSYO). They are currently conducted by James Fellenbaum, who also serves as the Knoxville Symphony Orchestra's resident conductor.

The orchestra attracts internationally renowned soloists and conductors each year, such as Midori, Stefan Jackiw, Cho-Liang Lin, Frank Sinatra Jr., and others.

== See also ==
- Knoxville Opera
