= Peter Staub =

Swiss-American mayor (1827–1904)

Consul Peter Staub
- Official portrait, 1885

U.S. Consul to St. Gallen, Switzerland
- In office 1885–1888
- President: Grover Cleveland

Consul General of Switzerland to Knoxville, Tennessee
- In office 1869 - 1884
- President: Ulrich Ochsenbein

Personal details
- Born: Peter Staub; February 22, 1827 Glarus, Switzerland
- Died: May 19, 1904 (aged 77) Knoxville, Tennessee, U.S.
- Resting place: Old Gray Cemetery
- Citizenship: Swiss; American
- Party: Democratic
- Spouse: Rosina Blum (m. 1847)
- Relations: John F. Staub (grandson)
- Children: 8
- Occupation: Businessman; tailor; colonizer; politician

Johann Peter Staub colloquially Peter Staub (February 22, 1827 – May 19, 1904) was a Swiss-born American businessman, politician, and diplomat. Staub held several public offices, most notably as U.S. Consul to St. Gallen, appointed in 1885 by Grover Cleveland. Previously he served two terms as Mayor of Knoxville, Tennessee and as Consul of Switzerland in Tennessee from 1869 to 1884, promoting Swiss emigration to the Appalachian region. He was also an important colonizer who helped to established the town of Gruetli-Laager in 1869.

Staub, who was born in Glarus, Switzerland, emigrated to the United States with the trade of tailor in 1854, initially settling in New Jersey. Due to the climate which was not good for his health, he and his wife relocated to Tennessee in 1856. There he was primarily active as serial entrepreneur, opening a tailor shop and investing his profits in real estate. In 1872, he built and opened the city's first opera house, Staub's Theatre. In 1875, he founded the Knoxville Foundry Plant. He also served as trustee of the Lawson McGee Library and as chairman of the Knoxville Water Commission.

== Early life and education ==
Staub was born February 22, 1827 in Glarus, Switzerland, the second of four children, to Jakob Staub (1777-1836) and Anna Maria (née Stäger; 1802-1832), both of Bilten.

He was orphaned when he was eight years old. At age 13, he was apprenticed to a tailor, and worked in this trade in France and Switzerland throughout the 1840s. Staub married Rosina Blum in 1847. While living in Switzerland, they had two children, both of whom died at a young age.

== Emigration and career ==
In 1854, Staub and his wife moved to the United States, initially settling in New Jersey. Shortly after his arrival, Staub's health began to decline. Concluding he would benefit from a more mountainous environment, Staub decided to move to East Tennessee, often advertised during this period as the "Switzerland of America." In 1856, Staub opened a tailor shop on Gay Street in Knoxville. During the Civil War, Staub's house on the periphery of Knoxville was burned by the Union Army to prevent Confederate soldiers from using it for shelter. He rebuilt it, and his tailoring business thrived in the post-war years. He reinvested his profits in real estate in the Knoxville area.

=== Staub's Theatre ===
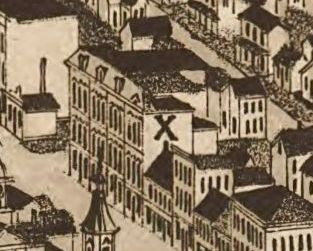
Staub's Theatre (center), as it appeared on an 1886 map of Knoxville

During the years following the Civil War, Knoxville gained a reputation for cultural backwardness that many of the city's residents found embarrassing. The Knoxville Whig and other newspapers called on the city's wealthy to fund construction of a respectable theater. In 1871, Staub announced he was building a three-story opera house at the corner of Gay and Cumberland, across the street from the Lamar House Hotel.

One of the first major buildings designed by Knoxville architect Joseph Baumann, Staub's Theatre measured 52 feet (16 m) by 128 feet (39 m) and included a 24-foot (7.3 m) main hall, private boxes, a parquette, and a 25-foot (7.6 m) by 48-foot (15 m) stage. The theater opened on October 2, 1872, with a dedication by former congressman Thomas A. R. Nelson and a performance of Sheridan Knowles's William Tell by the Knoxville Histrionic Society. The play, based on the Swiss folk hero, was selected in honor of Staub.

In subsequent decades, Staub's Theatre hosted performances by such diverse groups as Payson's English Opera Troupe, Boston's Mendelssohn Quintette Club, the Theodore Thomas Orchestra, and the Firmin-Jack Comedy Club, as well as lectures and readings, and minstrel shows. In the early 1900s, Staub's began to host vaudeville acts and wrestling matches, reflecting Knoxville's influx of working class migrants.

=== Public life ===
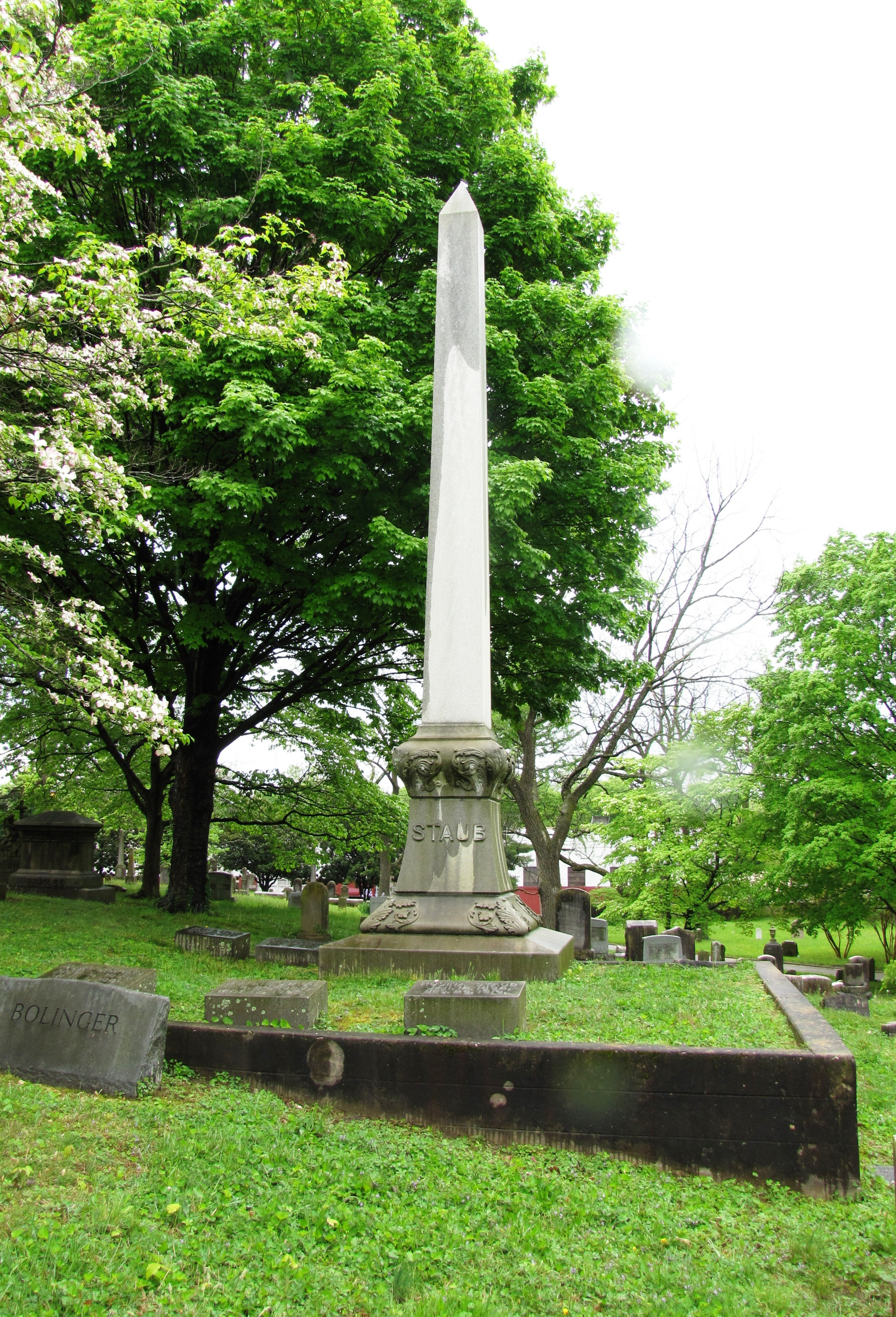
Staub obelisk at Old Gray Cemetery

During the late 1860s, Staub began working with a group called the Tennessee Clonisation Gesellschaft, which sought to establish colonies of Swiss immigrants atop the Cumberland Plateau west of Knoxville. Staub purchased a large tract of land along a remote section of the Plateau in Grundy County in 1869 that provided the core of the Swiss colony of Gruetli (now Gruetli-Laager). The land proved too wooded, barren, and remote, however, and the colony failed to develop as Staub had envisioned.

Staub was first elected mayor of Knoxville in 1874. During his first term, he expanded the city's fire department, and organized the city's public school system. Staub was elected again in 1881 and spent much of this second term helping the city develop a public waterworks.

In 1869, Staub was appointed consul for the Swiss government in Tennessee. In this capacity, he looked after Swiss interests in the state, including the Gruetli colony. President Rutherford B. Hayes appointed Staub a commissioner for the United States at the Paris Exposition of 1878. In 1885, President Cleveland appointed him United States Consul at St. Gallen, Switzerland.

== Personal life ==
In 1847, Staub married Rosina Blum, in Glarus, Switzerland. They had six children;

- Katherine Staub (1854-1898), married to Charles McGhee Fouche; five children
- Rosina L. Staub, colloquially Rosa (1858-1881), married to James O'Connor Dickens, no children
- Frederick Staub (1861-1934), married Anna C. Fanz (1868-1937), who was half German and half American of planter ancestry, four children including John Fanz Staub (1892-1981), a noted architect. Hopecote, a house he designed in 1924, was listed on the National Register of Historic Places in 2012.
- John Peter Staub (1864-1937), married firstly to Mary Myrtle "Molly" Coffman, secondly to Mary Elizabeth McCroskey; no children
- Mary Staub (born 1866), died in childbed
- Paulina Blum Staub (1868-1953), never married

Staub was injured in a carriage accident on May 18, 1904, and died the following day. He is interred in a family plot, crowned by a large marble obelisk, in Old Gray Cemetery. Staub's son, Fritz, continued to operate Staub's Theatre for several years. The theater later changed its name to the Lyric Theatre and continued to host performances until 1956, when it was demolished. Knoxville's tallest building, the First Tennessee Plaza, now stands at the site.

== See also ==
- R. F. Graf
- Peter Kern
- James G. Sterchi
