= Kevin Burdette =

American bass

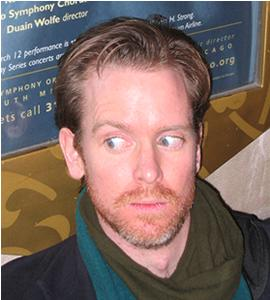
Kevin Burdette

Kevin Burdette is an American bass who has worked as a soloist with the Teatro alla Scala, Metropolitan Opera, Gran Teatre del Liceu, Santa Fe Opera, Seattle Opera, Teatro Colón, Dallas Opera, San Diego Opera, Washington National Opera, New York City Opera, Opéra de Montréal, Boston Lyric Opera, Glimmerglass Opera, Opera Philadelphia, and the Spoleto Festival USA, as well as many regional opera companies including Florentine Opera, Opéra de Québec, Portland Opera, Lyric Opera of Kansas City, Atlanta Opera, Virginia Opera, Wolf Trap Opera Company, Chicago Opera Theater, Opera Memphis, Gotham Chamber Opera, Knoxville Opera, Opera Grand Rapids, Toledo Opera, and the Lyric Opera of San Antonio. He has created multiple roles, including Beck Weathers in Joby Talbot's Everest, Eric Gold and the Ghost of Bazzetti in Jake Heggie's Great Scott, Papinou in Talbot's The Diving Bell and the Butterfly, and Ob in Mark Adamo's Becoming Santa Claus, all with Dallas Opera, and Blindman and Stobrod Thewes in Jennifer Higdon's Cold Mountain, Manuel Toulon in Huang Ruo's M. Butterfly, Correspondent in John Corigliano's Lord of Cries, and Henry B. Isaacson and Justice Wills in Theo Morrison's Oscar, all with Santa Fe Opera.

His concert engagements have included solo work with the Chicago Symphony Orchestra, Los Angeles Philharmonic (with Gustavo Dudamel), Philadelphia Orchestra (with Yannick Nézet-Séguin), Philharmonia Orchestra (with Esa-Pekka Salonen), National Symphony Orchestra, American Symphony Orchestra, Les Violons du Roy, Seattle Symphony, Cincinnati Symphony Orchestra, Milwaukee Symphony Orchestra, The Chamber Music Society of Lincoln Center, New Jersey Symphony Orchestra (with Neeme Järvi), Berkeley Symphony Orchestra (with Kent Nagano), Utah Symphony Orchestra (with Keith Lockhart), Nashville Symphony, Boston Baroque, the EOS Orchestra, AXIOM Ensemble (with Alan Gilbert), and the Virginia Symphony Orchestra at venues including Carnegie Hall, Avery Fisher Hall, Walt Disney Concert Hall, Alice Tully Hall, Weill Recital Hall, Chicago's Orchestra Hall, and San Francisco's Davies Symphony Hall.

A recipient of the Richard F. Gold Career Grant awarded by the Shoshana Foundation, the Dr. Marcia Robbins-Wilf Award, presented by New York City Opera to an artist who demonstrates outstanding dramatic ability, and the Alumni Promise Award from the University of Tennessee, he has been a member of both l'Opéra National de Paris young artists' Program and the San Francisco Opera young artist program.

Burdette received his master's degree in vocal performance at the Juilliard School, two Bachelor of Arts degrees (B.A. in College Scholars and a B.A. in music with a minor in history) from the University of Tennessee, and spent a year studying at the Universität für Musik und darstellende Kunst Wien. He was born and raised in Knoxville, Tennessee.
