= Enzo Dara =

Italian opera singer (1938–2017)

- Born: 13 October 1938; Mantua, Kingdom of Italy
- Died: 25 August 2017 (aged 78); Mantua, Italy
- Genres: Opera
- Instrument: Vocals

Enzo Dara (13 October 1938 – 25 August 2017) was an Italian basso buffo. Opera News described him as "one of the most famous Italian basses on the opera stage [known for] portraying a cluster of touchstone roles that highlighted his natural gifts for comedy, rapid-fire patter and bel canto technique." He is particularly admired for his performances in operas by Rossini.

== Career ==
Dara began his professional life as a journalist before deciding to pursue a career as an opera singer. He studied singing with Bruno Sutti in Mantua, and made his professional debut as Colline in Puccini's La Bohème in 1960 in Fano, a town and commune in the Marche region of Italy.

He performed at the Metropolitan Opera in New York 59 times. In Reggio Emilia, in 1967, Dara played Don Bartolo in Il barbiere di Siviglia. At the Festival of the Due Mondi in Spoleto in 1969, he was Mustafà in L'Italiana in Algeri, and at La Scala, two years later, again Don Bartolo in Il barbiere di Siviglia, directed by Claudio Abbado. On tour at La Scala and at the Royal Opera House in London in 1976 he played Dandini in La Cenerentola. Among his most famous roles were Don Bartolo in Il barbiere di Siviglia, which he played in more than 400 performances, L'Italiana in Algeri as Taddeo, Dulcamara in L'Elisir D'Amore, Don Magnifico in La Cenerentola and Don Pasquale in Don Pasquale. In 2000 he performed as the Sacristan in Puccini's Tosca in Rome opposite Ines Salazar and Luciano Pavarotti, with Placido Domingo conducting.

He performed with various other famous singers as Samuel Ramey, Paolo Montarsolo, Leo Nucci, Luigi Alva, Hermann Prey, Luciano Pavarotti, Teresa Berganza, Lucia Valentini Terrani, Marilyn Horne, Kathleen Battle, Cecilia Bartoli and others.

Dara was also an author. In 1994 he released his first book Anche il buffo nel suo piccolo, a collection of memories, anecdotes and observations.

In the 1990s Enzo Dara's performances became less frequent, and he tried his hand at directing. He directed several productions, including Il maestro di cappella and Don Pasquale.

In 1992 he was awarded the Donizetti Prize by the Donizetti Festival in Bergamo.

== Bibliography ==
- Anche il buffo nel suo piccolo (1994)

== Sources ==
- Stinchelli, Enrico, Le stelle della lirica, Roma, Gremese Editore, 1986, p. 193
