= Luciana Serra =

Italian coloratura soprano (born 1946)

- Born: 4 November 1946 (age 78); Genoa, Italy
- Occupation: Operatic soprano
- Website: www.lucianaserra.info

Luciana Serra (born 4 November 1946, in Genoa) is an Italian coloratura soprano.

== Career ==
Serra made her international debut in 1966 as Eleonora in Cimarosa's Il convito at the Hungarian State Opera House in Budapest, but did not achieve general acclaim until the late 1970s, when she took on coloratura roles in Donizetti's Lucia di Lammermoor and Bellini's La sonnambula. In 1988, Serra debuted at the Vienna State Opera singing the Queen of the Night in a new production of Die Zauberflöte conducted by Nikolaus Harnoncourt and staged by Otto Schenk.

Her fame reached a peak during the break of the 1980s and 1990s, when she performed the Queen of the Night in Die Zauberflöte at the Royal Opera House in London and at the Metropolitan Opera in New York.

She regularly teaches at Villa Medici in Rome and at the Accademia La Scala in Milan.

Her discography includes Il barbiere di Siviglia, Il viaggio a Reims, Rigoletto, Don Pasquale and Die Zauberflöte.
