= Rockwell Blake =

American operatic tenor (born 1951)

Rockwell Blake (born January 10, 1951) is an American operatic tenor, particularly known for his roles in Rossini operas. He was the first winner of the Richard Tucker Award.

== Biography ==
Born and raised in Plattsburgh, NY, Blake was the son of a mink farmer. After graduating from high school in Peru, he studied music first at the State University of New York at Fredonia and then at The Catholic University of America. On leaving Catholic University, he served for three years in the United States Navy as a member of the Sea Chanters male chorus and later as a soloist with the US Navy Band. During that time, he continued his voice training with Renata Carisio Booth, who had been his teacher since his school days.

He made his solo opera debut in 1976 at the Kennedy Center in Washington D.C. as Lindoro in Rossini's L'italiana in Algeri, and made his debut at the New York Metropolitan Opera House in 1981 in the same role, with Marilyn Horne as his Isabella. He went on to become one of the leading Rossini singers of his generation, singing regularly at the Rossini Opera Festival in Pesaro since his debut there in 1983. He made his only stage appearance at La Scala in 1992 as Giacomo in La donna del lago. It was La Scala's first production of the opera in 150 years and was staged to mark the bicentenary of Rossini's birth.

Although several critics have expressed reservations about the intrinsic slightly harsh timbre of his voice, his two-and-a-half octave range and mastery of florid vocal technique and coloratura have made him a successful interpreter not only of Rossini's tenore contraltino roles (in whose recent revival he has been a chief protagonist), but also of operas by Mozart, Donizetti, Bellini and Handel. Within that repertoire, Blake has sung in over 40 operas, including relative rarities such as Rossini's Zelmira, Mozart's' Zaide, Donizetti's Il furioso all'isola di San Domingo, Haydn's L'infedelta delusa and Boieldieu's La Dame blanche. Blake has also been active in the orchestral and oratorio tenor repertoire, performing in works by Bach, Beethoven, Berlioz, Britten, Handel, Haydn, Mendelssohn, Mozart, Rossini, Saint-Saëns, and Stravinsky.

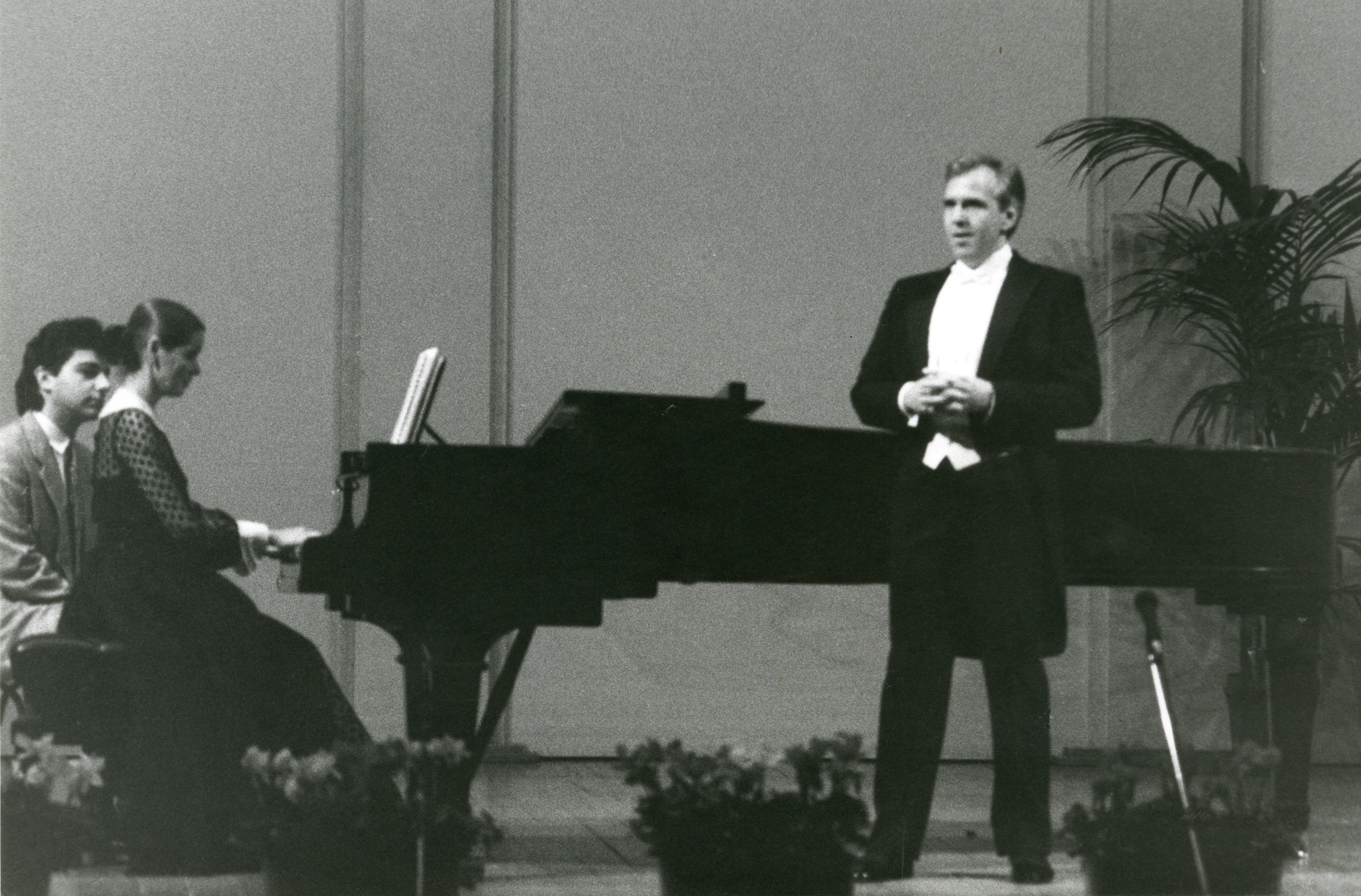
Rockwell Blake accompanied by Denise Massé at the Teatro Storchi, Modena, Italy (1988).

Since 2001 he has increasingly devoted himself to teaching and has given master classes at the Associazione Lirica Concertistica Italiana in Milan, the Conservatoire Nationale de Paris, the Accademia Nazionale di Santa Cecilia in Rome, Duke University in North Carolina, the State University of New York at Plattsburgh, the Hamburg Staatsoper, and the Chicago Lyric Opera young artists program.

His last appearances on the opera stage were as Uberto in Rossini's La donna del lago (Lisbon, 2005) and as Libenskoff in Rossini's Il viaggio a Reims (Montecarlo, 2005).

== Prizes and distinctions ==
- Richard Tucker Award, 1978
- Omicron Delta Kappa, 1988, SUNY Plattsburgh
- Cavaliere Ufficiale, Ordine al Merito della Repubblica Italiana, 1994
- Diapason d'Or de l'Année, 1994
- Honorary Degree – Doctor of Music, State University of New York at Plattsburgh, 1988
- Victoire de la Musique, 1997
- Chevalier de l'Ordre des Arts et des Lettres de la République française, 2000
- Grand Prix du Palmarès des Palmarès, 2004

== Discography ==
Operas

- Boieldieu – La Dame blanche, Conductor: Marc Minkowski (CD Angel/EMI)
- Donizetti – Alina, Regina di Golconda: Conductor Antonello Allemandi (CD Nuova Era)
- Donizetti – Marino Faliero, Conductor: Ottavio Dantone (DVD Hardy Classic)
- Mozart – Mitridate Re di Ponto, Conductor: Theodor Guschlbauer (DVD Euro Arts)
- Rossini – Il barbiere di Siviglia, Conductor: Bruno Campanella (CD Nuova Era)
- Rossini - Il barbiere di Siviglia, Conductor: Ralf Weikert (DVD Deutsche Grammophon)
- Rossini – La Donna del Lago, Conductor: Riccardo Muti (CD Philips)
- Rossini – La Donna del Lago, Conductor: Riccardo Muti (DVD La Scala Collection)
- Rossini – La Donna del Lago, Conductor: Claudio Scimone (CD Ponto)
- Rossini – Elisabetta Regina d'Inghilterra, Conductor Gabriele Ferro (DVD Hardy Classic)
- Meyerbeer – Robert le Diable, Conductor Thomas Fulton (DVD Encore)

Recitals

- Airs d'Opéras Français (CD EMI)
- The Rossini Tenor (CD Arabesque Records)
- Encore Rossini (CD Arabesque Records)
- The Mozart Tenor (CD Arabesque Records)
- Rossini Melodies (CD EMI)
- Participation in The Rossini Bicentennial Birthday Gala (VHS/Laserdisc and CD EMI)
