= Simone Alaimo =

Italian bass-baritone

Simone Alaimo (born 3 February 1950) is an Italian bass-baritone. He is particularly known for his performances of the bel canto repertoire.

== Life ==
A native of Villabate, Alaimo studied at the Palermo Conservatory and then the L'Accademia di La Scala in Milan before making his début in 1977 at the Teatro Fraschini in Pavia as the title hero in Gaetano Donizetti's Don Pasquale. Shortly thereafter he joined the roster of singers at the Teatro Massimo in his home city. In 1980 he made his first appearance at the Piccola Scala in a production of Carlo Evasio Soliva's La testa di bronzo and performed for the first time at the Maggio Musicale Fiorentino as Radamanto in Giulio Caccini's Euridice. That year also marked his debut at the Festival de Ópera de Las Palmas and the Teatro Carlo Felice, two places he has sung with some frequency. In 1982 he performed for the first time at the Teatro di San Carlo, the Teatro dell'Opera di Roma, the Liceu, and the Rossini Opera Festival. He sang the role of Mustafà in Gioachino Rossini's L'italiana in Algeri for his United States debut at the Lyric Opera of Chicago in 1987. He reprised the role the following year for his first performance in the United Kingdom at the Royal Opera, London. In 2011, he appeared at Teatro Massimo Bellini, in Il Barbiere Di Siviglia, and Le Convenienze Ed Inconvenienze Teatrali.

His nephew, Nicola Alaimo, is a successful baritone, born in 1978, who has worked with Riccardo Muti, among other conductors.
