= Paolo Montarsolo =

Italian opera singer

As Don Magnifico in Rossini's La Cenerentola, 1981

Paolo Montarsolo (16 March 1925 – 31 August 2006) was an Italian operatic bass particularly associated with buffo roles.

== Biography ==
Montarsolo was born in Portici. After vocal studies in Naples and Milan, he made his debut at the Teatro San Carlo in 1949 and at La Scala in 1951, first singing small roles but quickly established himself in buffo roles in operas by Wolfgang Amadeus Mozart and Gioachino Rossini, and taking part in many revivals of 18th-century operas by composers such as Giovanni Battista Pergolesi, Luigi Cherubini, Domenico Cimarosa, Giovanni Paisiello, etc. In 1954, he began appearing outside Italy, notably in Vienna, Salzburg, Paris, London, Glyndebourne, and made his American debut in 1957 at the Dallas Opera, subsequently appearing at the San Francisco Opera, the Lyric Opera of Chicago and the Metropolitan Opera in New York. Besides the 18th- and 19th-century Italian repertoire, he also gained considerable acclaim in character roles such as Fra Melitone, Geronte, Gianni Schicchi, Baron Ochs, the Doctor in Wozzeck, as well as roles in many contemporary works by Rota, Tosatti, etc.

He retired from the stage in 1997, but remained active as a stage director and teacher. He died in Rome in 2006.

== Sources ==
- Guide de l'opéra, Roland Mancini & Jean-Jacques Rouveroux, Fayard, 1986.
- Opera News, Obituaries, November 2006.
