= List of compositions by Fabio Vacchi =

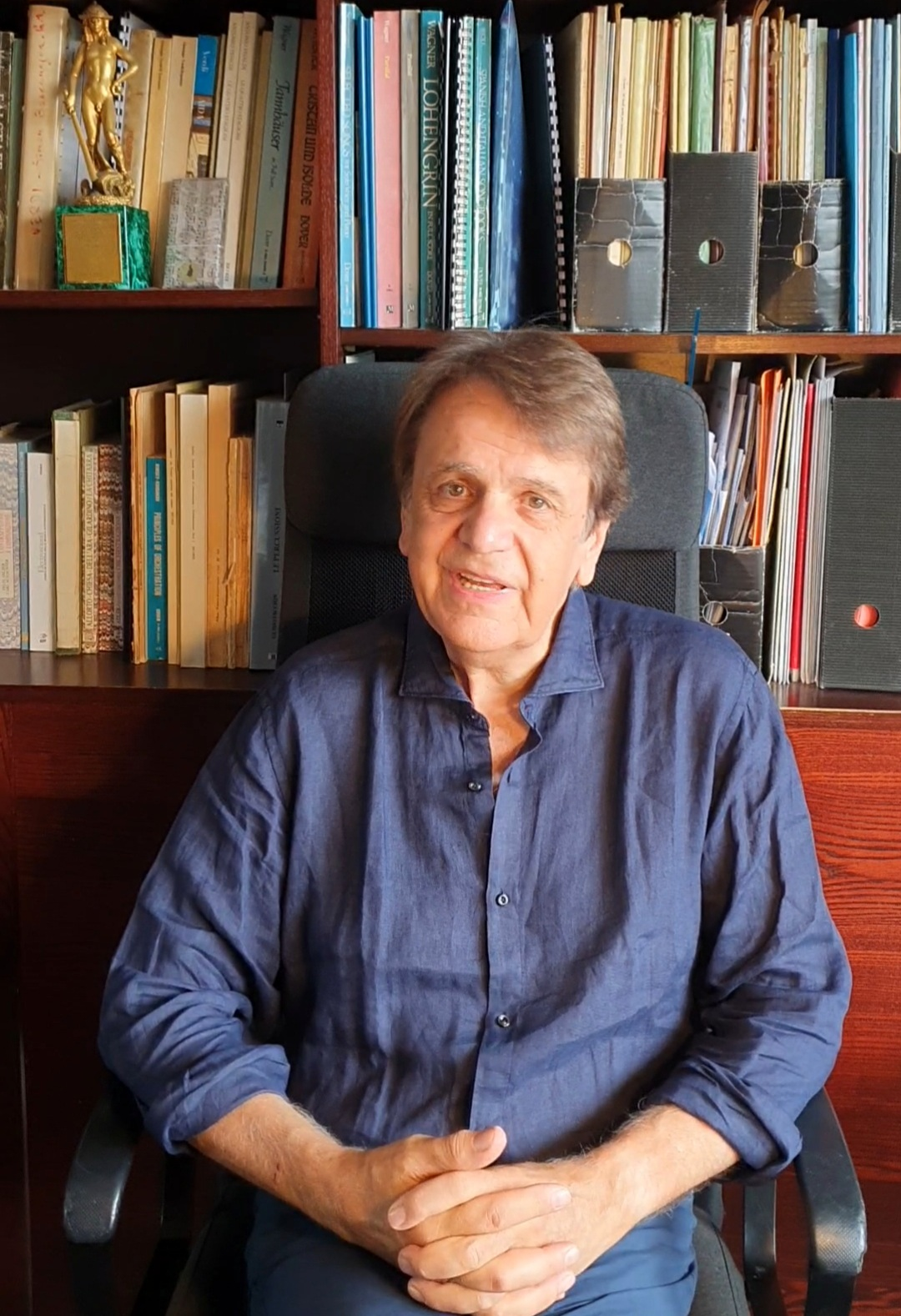
Fabio Vacchi in 2021

This is a list of compositions by Fabio Vacchi.

== By genre ==
=== Works for the stage ===
- Girotondo (1982), opera in 2 acts, loosely adapted from Arthur Schnitzler’s Reigen by Roberto Roversi, commissioned by the Maggio Musicale Fiorentino
- Il Viaggio (1990), opera in 2 acts, libretto by Tonino Guerra, commissioned by the Teatro Comunale di Bologna
- La station thermale (1993), dramma giocoso in 3 acts, libretto by Myriam Tanant after Carlo Goldoni’s I bagni d’Abano, commissioned by the Opéra National de Lyon
- Scena per Doktor Faustus (1995), choreographed poem by Heinrich Heine for 2 magnetic tapes, libretto by Lorenzo Salveti, commissioned by the Bologna Teatro Comunale.
- Dioniso germogliatore (1996), ballet in 5 tableaux, text by Giuliano Scabia, commissioned by the Ravenna Festival
- Les oiseaux de passage (1998), opera in 5 sequences, libretto by Myriam Tanant, commissioned by the Opéra National de Lyon and the Bologna Teatro Comunale.
- La burla universale. Cantata abbastanza profana (2001), in one act, for female voice, 2 baritone voices, and orchestra, libretto by Franco Marcoaldi, commissioned by Rai Radio Tre for centennial of Verdi’s death
- Il letto della Storia (2003), opera in 3 acts, libretto by Franco Marcoaldi, commissioned by the Maggio Musicale Fiorentino
- Macbeth (2007), incidental music for the marionette production of the Compagnia Marionettistica Carlo Colla e Figli
- La madre del mostro (2007), libretto by Michele Serra, commissioned by the Accademia Musicale Chigiana
- Teneke (2007), opera in 3 acts, libretto by Franco Marcoaldi on a subject of Yashar Kemal, commissioned by the Teatro alla Scala of Milan.

=== Choral and vocal works ===
- Ballade (1978) for soprano and chamber orchestra, text of William Butler Yeats
- Continuo (1979) for soprano and instruments, text of Dino Campana
- Scherzo (1979) for soprano and chamber orchestra, text of Tonino Guerra
- Arietta Pensiero non darti (1980) for flute and soprano, or also, from the opera Girotondo for flute solo
- Grande Aria A guardar (1981) for soprano and instruments, from the opera Girotondo
- Trois vision de Geneviève (1981) for 11 string soloists and a child’s voice
- Dona nobis pacem (1994) for double chorus, on 3 subjects of Claudio Monteverdi from the Missa in illo tempore
- Mignon (über die Sehnsucht) (1995) for voice and piano, text of Johann Wolfgang Goethe
- Briefe Büchners (1996), six lieder for baritone, bass clarinet, and piano on fragments of the letters of Georg Büchner, commissioned by Claudio Abbado and the Berliner Festwochen
- Dioniso germogliatore II – un recitar sinfonico (1997) for narrator and orchestra, text of Giuliano Scabia
- Sacer sanctus (1997), cantata for mixed chorus and ensemble, text of Giuseppe Pontiggia
- Io vorrei, superato ogni tremore (1998) for soprano and ensemble, text of Alda Merini, commissioned by the festival Milano Musica
- Die neugeborne Ros’entzückt (1998) for soprano and orchestra
- Tre veglie (1999) for mezzo-soprano, cello, and orchestra, text of Franco Marcoaldi, commissioned by the Salzburg Festival
- La prima figura da sinistra (2000) for voice and bass clarinet
- Terra comune (2002) for chorus and orchestra, text of Franco Marcoaldi, commissioned by the Accademia Nazionale di Santa Cecilia
- Canti di Benjaminovo (2003) for voice and string quintet, text of Franco Marcoaldi, commissioned by the Boston Musica Viva Ensemble
- Memoria italiana (2003) for 4 voices, text of Franco Marcoaldi, commissioned by the Festival delle Nazioni of Città di Castello
- Cjante (2004) for soprano and orchestra on a fragment of the Song of Songs translated in the Friuli dialect, commissioned by the Mittelfest of Cividale del Friuli
- Irini, Esselam, Shalom (2004) for voice, violin concertante, and orchestra, text edited by Moni Ovadia, commissioned by the Orchestra Sinfonica di Milano "G. Verdi"
- Noc’ (2004) for soprano and piano, text of Aleksandr Pushkin
- Voce d’altra voce (2005) for two narrators, chorus and orchestra, on a fragment of the Song of songs translated in Arabic, Hebrew, and the Friuli dialect, commissioned by the Mittelfest of Cividale del Friuli
- Mi chiamo Roberta (2006) for violin, cello, percussion, piano and two narrators, text of Aldo Nove, commissioned by the Mittelfest of Cividale del Friuli
- La giusta armonia (2006) for narrator and orchestra, text of Franz Heinrich Ziegenhagen, commissioned by the Salzburg Festival

=== Symphonic works ===
- Sinfonia in quattro tempi (1976)
- Poemetto (Nell’ali dei vivi pensieri) (1984)
- Danae (1989)
- Scramlézz d’estèd (1991)
- Dai calanchi di Sabbiuno (1997) for large orchestra, transcribed for the Gustav Mahler Youth Orchestra
- En Vinternatt (2001), commissioned by Ferrara Musica
- Diario dello sdegno (2002), commissioned by Teatro alla Scala
- Canti d’ombre (2004), commissioned by Orchestra Nazionale della RAI
- Dionysos suite (2004)
- Movimento di quartetto (2006) for orchestra, commissioned by the Accademia Musicale di San Giorgio
- Mare che fiumi accoglie (2007), commissioned by the Accademia Nazionale di Santa Cecilia

=== Works for soloist and orchestra ===
- Concerto per pianoforte e orchestra (1983)
- Notturno concertante (1994) for guitar and orchestra
- Veglia in canto (2003) for violin and string orchestra, commissioned by the Festival of the City of Portogruaro
- Lydia (2004) for violin and string orchestra
- Voci di notte (2006) for violin concertante/solo and orchestra, commissioned by the Maggio Musicale Fiorentino for Zubin Mehta’s 70th birthday

=== Chamber music ===
- Les soupirs de Geneviève (1975) for 11 string instruments
- Fantasia (1977) for 3 string instruments and harpsichord
- Il cerchio e gli inganni (1982) for chamber orchestra
- Convegno (1984) for flute and piano
- L’usgnol in vatta a un fil (1985) for ensemble
- Trio (1987) for flute, bass clarinet, (untuned) violin, cello and harp, from Luoghi immaginari
- Quartetto for Bruno Maderna (1989) for A clarinet, vibraphone, viola and piano, from Luoghi immaginari
- Quintetto (1987) for flute, bass clarinet, violin, cello and harp, from Luoghi immaginari
- Sestetto (1990)
- Ottetto for Luigi Nono (1991) from Luoghi immaginari
- Quartetto per archi n° 1 (1992)
- Settimino (1992) from Luoghi immaginari
- Klaviertrio (1993) for violin, cello, and piano
- 6 variazioni (1994) for ensemble
- Dai calanchi di Sabbiuno (1995) for 5 performers, commissioned by the Teatro alla Scala
- 2 Pezzi op. 45 (1995) for oboe, double bass, and piano
- Wanderer-Oktett (1997), commissioned by the European Soloist Chamber Ensemble
- Capriccio sopra La station thermale (1997) for 2 pianos
- Dai calanchi di Sabbiuno (1998) for chamber orchestra
- Movimento di quartetto (1999) for strings
- Intrada (1999) for B-flat trumpet and piano
- Wanderer-Sextett (2000) for 2 violins, 2 violas, and 2 cellos, commissioned by the Soloists of the Mahler Chamber Orchestra
- Orna buio ciel (2000) for violin, cello, and piano
- Suono di canna (2000) for 6 instruments
- Passacaglia (2000) for bass clarinet and bass tuba
- Apocrifo (2000) for 5 instruments
- Quartetto per archi n° 3 (2001), commissioned by the Tokyo String Quartet
- Quartetto per archi n° 4 (2004), commissioned by RAI Radio for the 80th anniversary of Italian radio

=== Works for a solo instrument ===
- ...di altri echi (1982) for violin
- Languido nascente(1983) for piano
- Plynn (1986) for guitar
- In alba mia, dir... (1995) for cello
- Interludio e Recitativo da Languido nascente (1995) for piano
- Presto, da boschi e prati (1999) for violin
- Tempo d’arco (2000) for double bass
- Respiri (2004) for violin
- Echi d’ombre (2005) for piano, commissioned by Per Piano Solo Meeting

=== Film score ===
- Soundtrack of The Profession of Arms (2001), a film directed by Ermanno Olmi
- In pace, in canto, music accompanying the credits of Cantando dietro i paraventi (2003), a film directed by Ermanno Olmi
- Soundtrack of Gabrielle (2005), a film directed by Patrice Chéreau
- Soundtrack of Centochiodi (2007), a film directed by Ermanno Olmi

=== Transcriptions and re-elaborations ===
- Francesco Paolo Tosti, Four Melodies, transcription for voice and orchestra (1985)
- Hugo Wolf, Two Lieder, from the Spanisches Liederbuch, transcription for voice and instruments (1993)
- John Dowland, Flow My Dowland, 5 Songs of John Dowland transcribed and orchestrated for alto voice and ensemble (1994)
- Johann Sebastian Bach, Contrapunctus V from The Art of Fugue, re-elaboration for orchestra (2001)
- César Franck, Sonata for violin and piano, transcription for violin and strings (2005)
