= İnce Memed =

Novel series by Yaşar Kemal

İnce Memed is a series of four epic novels written by the Turkish novelist Yaşar Kemal. The novel narrates the tale of Memed, the only son of a poor widow, who, after having witnessed the cruelties and injustices of feudalism under Abdi Ağa's (the landlord) yoke, decides to take up arms and emancipate the landless peasants of Çukurova. The novel is set in the early years of the Turkish Republic.

İnce Memed (1955), the first novel in the tetralogy, was Kemal's first published novel. Subsequent volumes of the İnce Memed saga were published in 1969, 1984 and 1987. The tetralogy took Kemal thirty-nine years to complete. The four-volume series was intended by Kemal to be ‘the epic of Anatolia.’

The main character is thought to be loosely based on a real historical bandit named "Safiye Memed".

The first novel adapted into a feature-length movie named as Memed, My Hawk in 1984 by director Peter Ustinov.

== The tetralogy ==
- İnce Memed (1955); English translation: Memed, My Hawk (1961)
- İnce Memed II (1969); They Burn the Thistles (1972)
- İnce Memed III (1984)
- İnce Memed IV (1987)
