= Teneke =

Teneke may refer to:

- Teneke (novel), a 1955 novel by writer Yaşar Kemal
- Teneke (opera), a 2007 opera by composer Fabio Vacchi
- Teneke (river), a stream in Akmola Region, Kazakhstan
