= Angelo Veccia =

Italian operatic baritone

Angelo Veccia (21 March 1963) is an Italian operatic baritone.

== Biography ==
Angelo Veccia began his musical studies in the Academy of St Cecilia in Rome, the city of his birth, with his father, tenor Luigi Veccia who won in 1964 the important Spoleto Competition for young singers. After winning the Battistini Competition in 1983 and in 1984 he had his debut as a bass first in the United States of America in the role of Grenvil in La traviata and then as Colline in a production of La bohème which allowed him to sing in many theaters of central Italy. Thanks to a scholarship he continued his studies in New York in the prestigious Juilliard School in the class of Daniel Ferro. As a bass, he debuted many roles, often in English, like, among others, Figaro in Mozart's The Marriage of Figaro, Basilio in Rossini's The Barber of Seville, Raimondo in Lucia di Lammermoor and Don Profondo in the American première of Il viaggio a Reims.

After the discovery and the development of the vocal range of a baritone, in 1988 he had his debut as Silvio in Pagliacci and Belcore in L'elisir d'amore and in 1990 he performed for the first time the role of Figaro in Rossini's opera, character which he interpreted for a long time in Italy and abroad. As a baritone, Veccia began a career which brought him to sing in many halls and theaters of all the world (Teatro alla Scala, Arena di Verona, Concertgebouw in Amsterdam).

His brother is the conductor Simone Veccia], founder of Piccola Orchestra '900 in Rome.

== Repertoire ==
Composer	Opera	Role
Bellini	I puritani	Sir Riccardo
Bizet	Carmen	Escamillo
Cilea	Adriana Lecouvreur	Michonnet
Braga	Jupira	Qurino
Donizetti	L'elisir d'amore	Belcore
Donizetti	Lucia di Lammermoor	Enrico
Giuranna	Mayerling	Archduke Giovanni Salvatore
Gluck	Iphigénie en Tauride	A Shiite
Leoncavallo	Pagliacci	Silvio
Mascagni	Amica	Giorgio
Mascagni	Cavalleria rusticana	Alfio
Meyerbeer	L'Africaine	Nelusko
Paisiello	Nina, o sia la pazza per amore	Giorgio
Pizzetti	Assassinio nella cattedrale	Second tempter
Puccini	La bohème	Marcello
Puccini	Gianni Schicchi	Gianni Schicchi
Puccini	Madama Butterfly	Sharpless
Puccini	Manon Lescaut	Lescaut
Puccini	Tosca	Scarpia
Puccini	Turandot	Ping
Rimsky-Korsakov	The Golden Cockerel	Zarevič Afron
Rossini	Barber of Seville	Figaro
Vacchi	Teneke	Medico
Verdi	Aida	Amonasro
Verdi	Un ballo in maschera	Renato
Verdi	Ernani	Don Carlo
Verdi	Falstaff	Lord Ford
Verdi	Macbeth	Macbeth
Verdi	Rigoletto	Rigoletto
Verdi	La traviata	Giorgio Germont
Verdi	Il trovatore	Conte di Luna

== Discography ==
- Gluck: Iphigénie en Tauride (Carol Vaness, Thomas Allen, Gösta Winbergh, Giorgio Surian, Riccardo Muti, Orchestra del Teatro alla Scala, 1993) Sony
- Puccini: Tosca (Mirella Freni, Plácido Domingo, Samuel Ramey, Anthony Laciura, Angelo Veccia, Bryn Terfel; Giuseppe Sinopoli, Philharmonia Orchestra, 1992) Deutsche Grammophon

== DVD ==
- Paisiello: Nina, o sia la pazza per amore (Cecilia Bartoli, Jonas Kaufmann, László Polgár, Juliette Galstian, Angelo Veccia; Ádám Fischer, Zürich Opera House Orchestra, 1998)
