= Robert Schmutzler =

German art historian

Art Nouveau by Robert Schmutzler. First American edition, Abrams, 1964.

Robert Schmutzler was a German art historian known for his work on the development of Art Nouveau that identified new and earlier origins for the style at a time when it was undergoing a revival.

== Art nouveau-Jugendstil ==
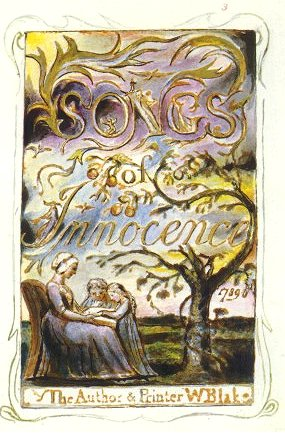
Title page of William Blake's Songs of Innocence, 1789.

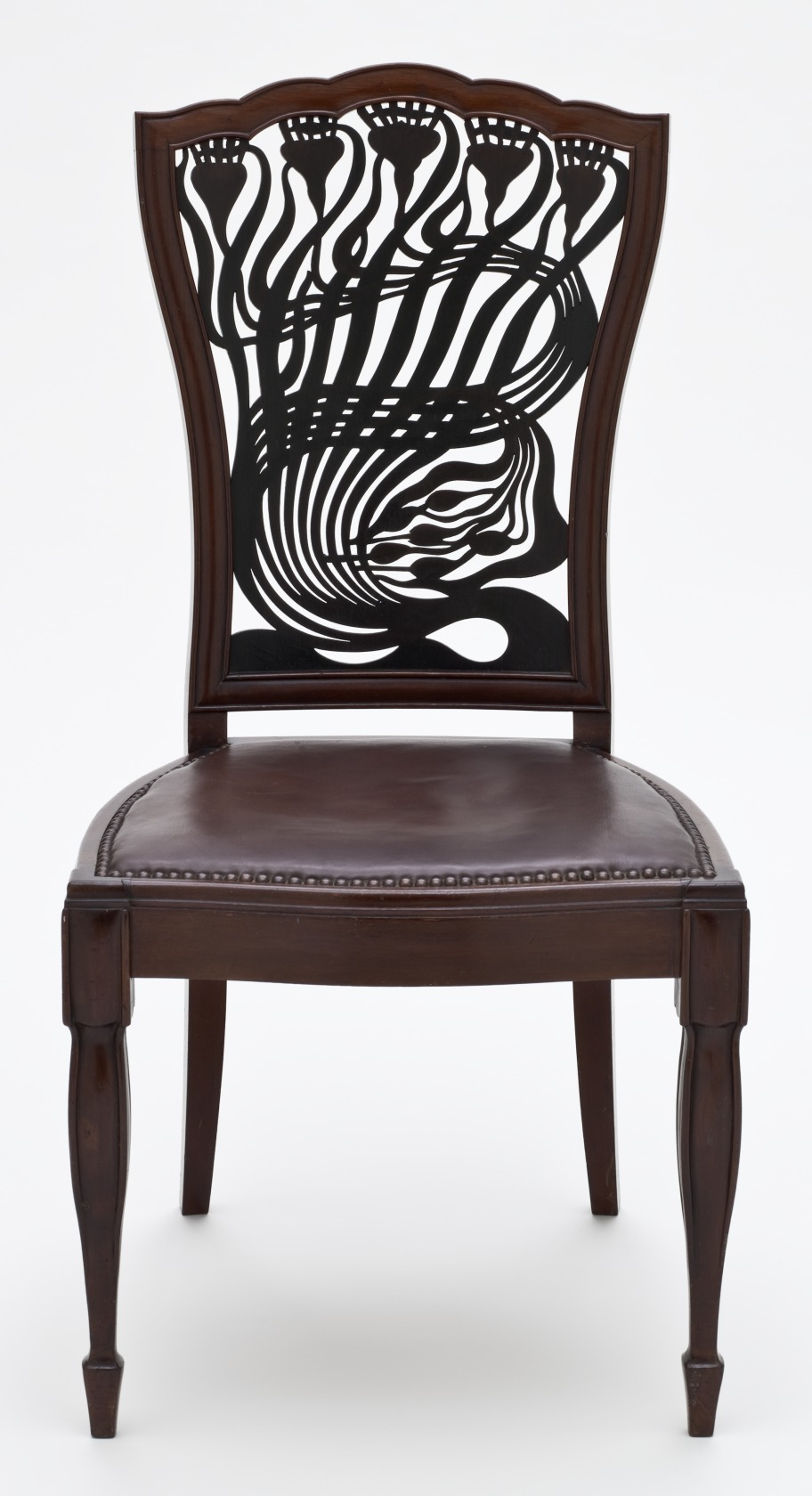
Chair designed by Arthur Mackmurdo in 1881, the back panel of which has been seen as a precursor of Art Nouveau design.

Schmutzler's major work was his book Art nouveau-Jugendstil (1962) which was developed from his doctoral thesis. It was printed in English in 1964 as Art Nouveau in a translation by Edouard Roditi, published by Thames and Hudson in the United Kingdom and Abrams in the United States.

The English language edition was positively reviewed by Lawrence Gowing in The Observer who pronounced it "fascinating" and by Eric Newton in The Guardian who honoured Schmutzler for disproving the belief that Victor Horta had invented the style, saying "The legend dies hard. In fact only German scholarship could kill it, and only a German scholar, with his complex machinery of philosophical interpretation and aesthetic analysis could manage to relate it to what came before..."

Newton criticised Schmutzler for the untidy organisation of the book and found the omission of Alphonse Mucha inexplicable, but praised him for identifying the British origins of the style in the work of William Blake, the Pre-Raphaelites, and Aubrey Beardsley, as well as in Arthur Mackmurdo's 1881 design for a chair. Schmutzler had already written about the British origins of the style and the influence of William Blake in particular in two articles in Architectural Review in 1955.

Edith Hoffmann on the other hand, in The Burlington Magazine, was less convinced that the eventual development of the Art Nouveau style could be convincingly attributed to the influence of Blake on the Pre-Raphaelites, arguing that his decorative work, derived from Rocaille ornament, was not his most important work. She was still less sure that "proto-Art Nouveau" elements could be found in the work of Palmer, Calvert, and Ingres as postulated by Schmutzler.

== Selected publications ==
- "The English origins of Art Nouveau", Architectural Review, Vol. 117, No. 698 (February 1955), pp. 108–117.
- "Blake and Art Nouveau", Architectural Review, Vol. 118, No. 704 (August 1955), pp. 90–97.
- Art nouveau-Jugendstil. Teufen, 1962.
- Art Nouveau. Thames and Hudson, London; Abrams, United States; 1964. (Revised and abridged edition 1978)

== See also ==
- John M. Jacobus
- Stephan Tschudi-Madsen
