= Aufderheide =

Aufderheide is a German surname, 'auf der Heide' means 'on the heath'. Notable people with the surname include:

- Ashley Aufderheide, American actress
- Charles Aufderheide (1918–1991), American technician
- May Aufderheide (1888–1972), American composer
- Patricia Aufderheide, American media studies

== See also ==
- Erika (song), which opens with the lyrics "Auf der Heide"
