= Peter Honess =

British film editor

- Born: 8 August 1946 (age 79); London, England
- Education: Queen's College, Taunton
- Occupation: Film editor
- Awards: BAFTA

Peter Honess (born 1946) is an English film editor with more than thirty film credits dating from 1973. Honess received the 1997 BAFTA Award for Best Editing for his work on L.A. Confidential.

== Education ==
Honess was educated at Queen's College, Taunton from 1956 to 1963.

== Career ==
He then became an apprentice editor at the United Kingdom branch of MGM, where his father was working. He moved to the United States in 1971, where he received his first editing credit for It's Alive! (1974), a cult horror film about a couple that become parents of a monster baby. When Honess returned to the United Kingdom, he was again employed as an assistant editor. In all, Honess spent fifteen years as an assistant. Honess acknowledges the mentoring by British editors Tony Gibbs (Tom Jones) and Thelma Connell (Alfie), "Thelma was quite an extraordinary woman. I was absorbed by how she edited. She cut very, very fast. That was also true of Tony. He'd cut the film in his head at dailies." After a ten-year hiatus, Honess was hired to edit the films Memed, My Hawk (1984) and Champion (1984), and thereafter he has worked regularly as an editor.

Honess's recent filmography includes Rob Roy (1995), L.A. Confidential (1997), The Next Best Thing (2000), The Fast and the Furious (2001), Harry Potter and the Chamber of Secrets (2002), Troy (2004), Aeon Flux (2005), Poseidon (2006), The Golden Compass (2007), I Love You, Beth Cooper (2008), Percy Jackson and the Olympians (2009), Burlesque (Cher's performance - 2010), Romeo & Juliet (2012), and Words and Pictures (2013).

== Filmography ==
Year	Title	Director	Notes
1973	Hell Up in Harlem	Larry Cohen	Co-edited with Franco Guerri
1974	It's Alive	Larry Cohen	
1979	Yesterday's Hero	Neil Leifer	Assistant editor
1980	The Dogs of War	John Irvin	Assistant editor
1981	Ragtime	Miloš Forman	Assistant editor
1983	The Hunger	Tony Scott	Assistant editor
1984	Champions	John Irvin	
1984	Memed, My Hawk	Peter Ustinov	
1984	Electric Dreams	Steve Barron	
1985	Plenty	Fred Schepisi	
1986	Highlander	Russell Mulcahy	
1987	The Believers	John Schlesinger	
1988	Madame Sousatzka	John Schlesinger	
1989	Next of Kin	John Irvin	
1990	The Russia House	Fred Schepisi	
1991	Ricochet	Russell Mulcahy	
1992	Mr. Baseball	Fred Schepisi	
1993	The Real McCoy	Russell Mulcahy	
1993	Six Degrees of Separation	Fred Schepisi	
1994	The Shadow	Russell Mulcahy	Co-edited with Beth Jochem Besterveld
1995	Rob Roy	Michael Caton-Jones	
1996	Eye for an Eye	John Schlesinger	
1997	L.A. Confidential	Curtis Hanson	BAFTA Award for Best Editing; Nominated — Academy Award for Best Film Editing; Nominated — ACE Eddie for Best Edited Feature Film; Nominated — Satellite Award for Best Film Editing
1998	Mercury Rising	Harold Becker	
2000	The Next Best Thing	John Schlesinger	
2000	Disney's The Kid	Jon Turteltaub	Co-edited with David Rennie
2001	The Fast and the Furious	Rob Cohen	
2001	Domestic Disturbance	Harold Becker	
2002	Harry Potter and the Chamber of Secrets	Chris Columbus	
2004	Troy	Wolfgang Petersen	
2005	Æon Flux	Karyn Kusama	Co-edited with Plummy Tucker
2006	Poseidon	Wolfgang Petersen	
2007	The Golden Compass	Chris Weitz	Co-edited with Anne V. Coates and Kevin Tent
2009	I Love You, Beth Cooper	Chris Columbus	
2010	Percy Jackson & the Olympians: The Lightning Thief	Chris Columbus	
2013	Words and Pictures	Fred Schepisi	
2013	Romeo & Juliet	Carlo Carlei	

== Awards ==
Honess was nominated for an ACE Eddie Award for documentary editing for Following the Tundra Wolf (1974). In addition to its BAFTA Award for Best Editing, L. A. Confidential was also nominated for an Academy Award for Best Film Editing, an ACE Eddie Award, and the Satellite Award. The film was also included in a 2012 listing of the 75 best edited films of all time compiled by the Motion Picture Editors Guild based on a survey of its members. Honess has been elected to membership in the American Cinema Editors.
