= Castel Henriette =

Villa in Sèvres, France

Coordinates: 48.822887°N 2.20413°E

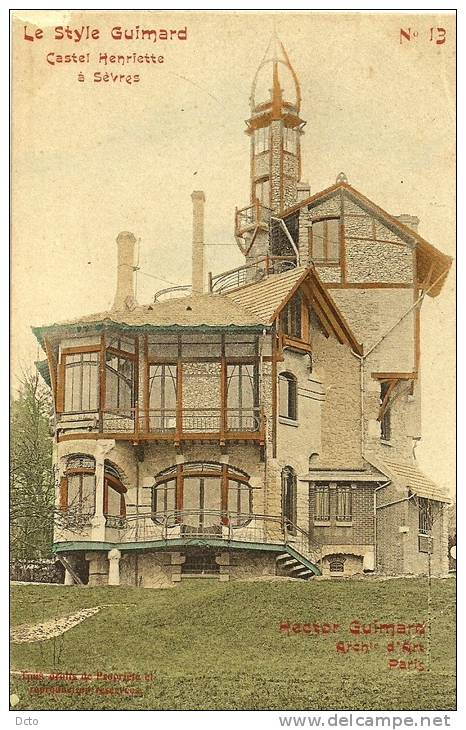
Castel Henriette in an advertising postcard produced by Hector Guimard

Castel Henriette was a villa designed by the Art Nouveau architect Hector Guimard in Sèvres, France, in 1899. It was completed in 1900 and modified in 1903 with the removal of the look-out tower, and was demolished in 1969.

== Building ==
Guimard designed Castel Henriette for Mme. Hefty in 1899, the commission also including a secondary house, a garage and a fountain. The site was gently sloping, with roads on three sides. Completed in 1900, the villa was one of a series of early residential projects in which he increasingly integrated interior and exterior into complete works of the "New Art". The exterior combined elements with medieval resonance; however in the interior, as he had at Castel Béranger, he left riveted girders visible in ceilings. Guimard also designed the layout of the garden, which had a bulge evoking in the plan the pupil of an eye, facing the main salon; the entrance was on one corner, at 30^{o} to the garden front.

In 1903 Guimard removed the look-out tower, which had become unstable, and added a bow window on the façade facing Rue des Binelles.

Castel Henriette fell into disuse before the Second World War, but during the 1960s was used as a setting in several films: Sans merveille (1963), La Ronde (1964), La Métamorphose des cloportes (1965), What's New Pussycat? (1965) and A Flea in Her Ear (1968).

The house was demolished in April 1969 despite efforts to save it. It has an entry in the Base Mérimée, and furniture designed for it is in the collection of the Bröhan Museum in Berlin and decorative elements in the collections of the Victoria and Albert Museum in London and the Musée d'Orsay in Paris, which also has architectural plans and furniture designs and drawings.

== Evaluations ==
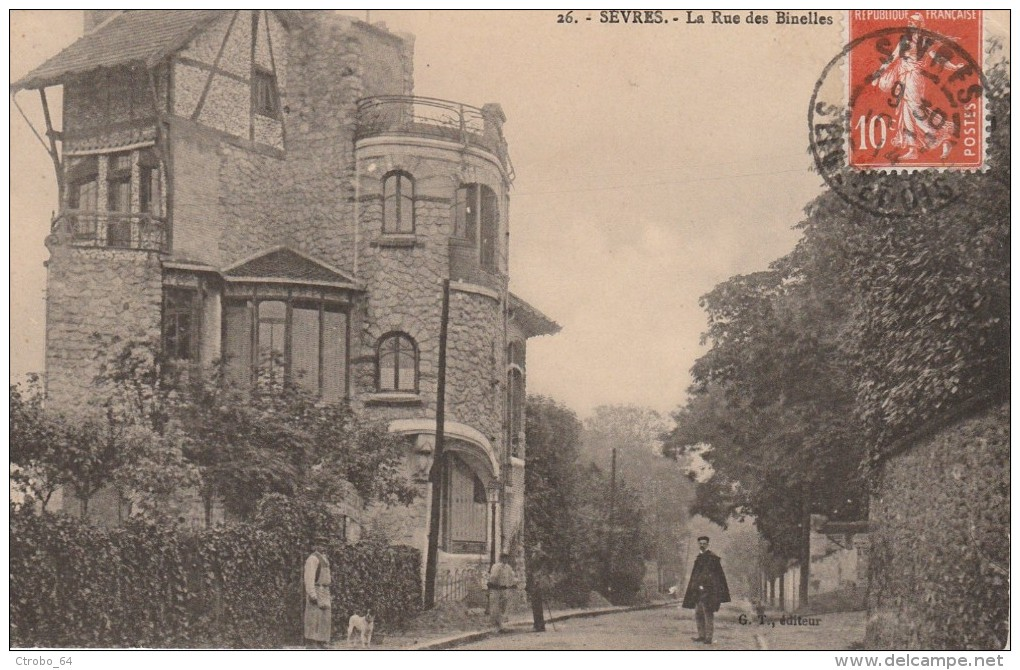
Castel Henriette in a 1914 postcard, after removal of the lookout tower

Castel Henriette had historicising elements. Art historians have judged it variably. In 1962 Robert Schmutzler, a specialist in the development of the style, found it "[reminiscent] of the medievalistic robber-baron castles of the prosperous upper bourgeoisie" and judged that it "[could] scarcely be said to represent Art Nouveau at its best". In 1972 Dennis Sharp, while echoing this assessment in calling it a "pastiche", wrote that it does exemplify the "allegiance to eccentric asymmetrical design" introduced by Art Nouveau, and in 1970 F. Lanier Graham saw it as representing "the highest flight of Guimard's architectural imagination", "a triumph of deliberate tensions", the first time he brought to architecture the "sense of spontaneous compression and release" he had previously developed in two dimensions. In 1978 it was similarly characterised as a "masterpiece" and the most explicit embodiment of the "underlying unease of Art Nouveau" and compared to "some inter-stellar object ... which appears to have landed on its site ... in a fortuitous way", and in 2006 Laurence des Cars called it "the high-water mark of Guimard's lyrical and oneiric idiom". Georges Vigne wrote in 1985 that it was "no doubt neither more successful nor more beautiful" than other works from what he called "Guimard's all-out baroque period", but that the tower made it "something at once playful and conspicuously original".
