= Small World (British TV series) =

Small World is a 1988 British television drama based on David Lodge's 1984 novel Small World: An Academic Romance. Structured as six one-hour episodes, its producer was Steve Hawes, and its director was Robert Chetwyn. Howard Schuman wrote the screenplay, in consultation with Lodge. The titles of the six episodes are:

- Part 1 - 'April Is the Cruellest Month'
- Part 2 - 'The Lady of Situations'
- Part 3 - 'Unreal Cities'
- Part 4 - 'What Shall We Do Tomorrow?'
- Part 5 - 'Throbbing and Waiting'
- Part 6 - 'Hurry up Please, It's Time'

Each episode opens with Persse McGarrigle speaking into a tape recorder at the underground chapel at Heathrow Airport, for communication to his mentor Professor McCreedy. Stuart Laing has described various changes and simplifications in the transition of the novel to the TV series.

== Cast ==
- Finbar Lynch (Persse McGarrigle)
- Stephen Moore (Philip Swallow)
- John Ratzenberger (Morris Zapp)
- Sarah Badel (Hilary Swallow / Joy Simpson)
- Rachel Kempson (Miss Maiden)
- Leonie Mellinger (Angelica Pabst / Lily Pabst)
- Sheila Gish (Fulvia Morgana / Desirée Zapp)
- Anthony Newlands (Jacques Textel)
- Marc de Jonge (Michel Tardieu)
- Charles Gray (Rudyard Parkinson)
- John Rogan (Professor McCreedy)
- David Milton-Jones (Albert)
- Julie Peasgood (Cheryl Summerbee)
- Frederick Jaeger (Siegfried von Turpitz)
- Malcolm Storry (Ronald Frobisher)
- Peter Cellier (Felix Skinner)
- Lewis Fiander (Robin Dempsey)
- Jeffrey Gardiner (Robert Sutcliffe)
- Robert Flemyng (Arthur Kingfisher)
- Marie-Elise Grepne (Gloria)
- Guy Moore (Matthew Swallow)
- Cecilia-Marie Carreon (Song-Mi Lee)
- Britt Morrow (Bernadette)
