= They Burn the Thistles =

1969 novel by Yaşar Kemal

- Author: Yaşar Kemal
- Original title: İnce Memed II
- Translator: Edouard Roditi
- Language: Turkish
- Publication date: 1969
- Publication place: Turkey
- English publication date: 1972
- Followed by: Ince Memed III

They Burn the Thistles – Ince Memed II (Turkish: İnce Memed means Memed the Thin) is a 1969 novel by Yaşar Kemal. It was Kemal's second novel in his İnce Memed tetralogy.

The first Ince Memed novel won the Varlik prize for that year (Turkey's highest literary prize) and earned Kemal a national reputation. In 1961, the book was translated into English by Edouard Roditi, thus gaining Kemal his first exposure to English-speaking readers. In 1984, the novel was freely adapted by Peter Ustinov into a film (also known as The Lion and the Hawk).

Until the publication of Orhan Pamuk's My Name is Red and Snow, İnce Memed was the best-known Turkish novel published after World War II.

== Plot ==
The plot of "They Burn the Thistles" is much the same as in the first novel "Memed, My Hawk", where Memed, a young boy from a village in Anatolia is abused and beaten by the villainous Abdi Agha, the local landowner. Having endured great cruelty towards himself and his mother, he finally escapes with his beloved, a girl named Hatche. Abdi Agha catches up with the young couple, but only manages to capture Hatche, while Memed is able to avoid his pursuers and runs into the mountains whereupon he joins a band of brigands and exacts revenge against his old adversary.

== Translation ==
The book was translated into English by Margaret E. Platon.

== Praise ==
The book received international acclaim and fame and was translated to several languages.

=== Editorial reviews ===
"Yashar Kemal…specializes in proletarian fiction–novels and short stories that bristle with passion and political commitment…Kemal has become Turkey's first world-class novelist…They Burn the Thistles is thus a valuable addition to the body of literature for society's sake" –- The Washington Post.
