= Teneke (novel) =

1955 novel by Yaşar Kemal

The Drumming-Out
- Author: Yaşar Kemal
- Original title: 'Teneke'
- Translator: Thilda Kemal
- Language: Turkish
- Publisher: Varlık Yayınları
- Publication date: 1955 (1st edition)
- Publication place: Turkey
- English publication date: 1968
- Media type: Print

Teneke (English: The Drumming-Out) is a novel by the Turkish author of Kurdish origin Yaşar Kemal, appeared in 1955 by Varlık Yayınları after its first publication in 1954 as an episode in the newspaper Cumhuriyet. It is Kemal's second novel. Teneke reached its 23rd edition, published 2004 by Yapı Kredi Yayınları.

The novel was published in Turkish language 1962 in Bulgaria, and was translated into various languages since 1964.

== Plot summary ==
In Teneke, Kemal depicts the tragic conditions, under which the landowners (aghas) in the region Çukurova in southern Anatolia of Turkey live and the way in which the rice planters exploit them. A young and idealistic district governor (Turkish: kaymakam), who is newly appointed there, tries to back the landowners struggling against oppression and injustice by a rice planter.

== Major characters ==
- Fikret Irmaklı – Kaymakam. A young and inexperienced district governor appointed to his first post.
- Resul Efendi – Office secretary. An old and incapable but honest man.
- Okçuoğlu Mustafa Bey – Arrogant and corrupt rice planter.
- The Doctor – Governmental official.
- Osman Ağa – Agha, rich landowner, who can not oppose his land is being overflooded.
- Memed Ali the Kurd – peasant, who does not surrender to Okçuoğlu, who intends to flood the village for planting rice.
- Zeyno Karı – Old activist woman of Kurdish origin, who incites Memed Ali to rebel against Okçuoğlu.
- Nermin – Kaymakam's fiancée, a university student far away, inspiring him to fight for the law to be respected.

== Awards ==
The theatrical adaption of Teneke brought Kemal the "İlhan İskender Award" in Turkey and the first prize at the Nancy International Theater Festival in 1966.

== Adaptations ==
=== Theatre ===
It was adapted into a theater play in two acts, and was staged by Gülriz Sururi-Engin Cezzar Theatre in Istanbul in 1965.

The play was staged in Gothenburg, Sweden, (where Yaşar Kemal lived for two years at the end of the 1970s), where it played for almost a year.

=== Opera ===
Italian composer Fabio Vacchi created an opera in three acts with the same title, which was premiered on September 22, 2007 at the Teatro alla Scala in Milan, Italy. The libretto was written by the Italian poet Franco Marcoaldi.

== Publication history ==
=== Turkish editions ===
- Turkey Teneke, Varlik Yayinlari (1st ed. Istanbul, 1955)
- Bulgaria Teneke, (1st ed. Sofia, 1962)

=== Translations ===
- Bulgaria Teneke, by Parashkev Parushev (1st ed. Sofia, 1964)
- United Kingdom The Drumming-Out (in Anatolian Tales), Collins and Harvill Press, by Thilda Kemal (1st ed. London, 1968)
- United States The Drumming-Out (in Anatolian Tales), Dodd, Mead and Co., by Thilda Kemal (1st ed. New York City, 1969) 160pp
- Russia Teneke, (1st ed. Moscow, 1970)
- Sweden Trumslagarna (in En smutsig historia och andra berattelser), Gidlunds Förlag, by Tora Palm (1st ed. Stockholm, 1972)
- Romania Ar'ita, Editura univers, by Valeriu Veliman (1st ed. Bucharest, 1974.)
- Denmark Blikdaserne, Gyldendal. by Jens Juhl Jensen (1st ed. Copenhagen, 1974)
- Denmark Blikdaserne, Samlerens Bogklub, by J.J. Jensen (1st ed. Copenhagen, 1974)
- Germany Anatolischer Reis, Verlag Heinrich Scheffler, by Horst Wilfrid Brands (1st ed. Frankfurt am Main)
- Germany Anatolischer Reis, Societäts-Verlag, by H.W. Brands (1st ed. Frankfurt am Main, 1979) ISBN 3-7973-0074-3
- Germany Anatolischer Reis DTV, by H.W. Brands (1st ed. Munich, 1987), 112pp ISBN 3-423-10704-9
- Italy Teneke, Giovanni Tranchida Editore. by Antonella Passaro (1st ed. Milan, 1997)
- Italy Teneke (in Sogni), Giovanni Tranchida Editore (1st ed. Milan, 1998)
- Italy Teneke. Biblioteca Tranchida (1st ed. Milan, 1999)
- Spain Calor amarillo (cuentos completos), Ediciones del Oriente y del Mediterraneo, by Gül Alkac e Fernando Garcia Burillo (1st ed. Guadarrama, 1999)

== Alteration of text ==
Leyla Burcu Dündar, an academic at Bilkent University in Ankara, compared the 4th edition (1972) of Teneke by Ararat Yayınevi with the latest publication of 2004 by Yapı Kredi Yayınları in a research work. She found out that the script has been significantly altered by the editors and the publishers in between without the knowledge of the author. The text was changed essentially to purify its language from non-Turkish words. In the latest edition, the grammar has been changed, regional sayings were replaced and even some sentences were dropped. Yaşar Kemal was highly astonished as he became aware of that fact.
