= What's New Pussycat? =

1965 film by Clive Donner

- Theatrical release poster by Frank Frazetta
- Directed by: Clive Donner
- Screenplay by: Woody Allen
- Produced by: Charles K. Feldman
- Starring: Peter Sellers; Peter O'Toole; Romy Schneider; Capucine; Paula Prentiss; Woody Allen; Ursula Andress
- Cinematography: Jean Badal
- Edited by: Fergus McDonell
- Music by: Burt Bacharach
- Production companies: Famous Artists Productions; Famartists Productions S.A.
- Distributed by: United Artists
- Release dates: June 22, 1965 (United States); January 28, 1966 (France)
- Running time: 108 minutes
- Countries: United States; France
- Language: English
- Box office: $18.8 million

What's New Pussycat? (Note: The opening titles do not include a question mark.) is a 1965 screwball comedy film directed by Clive Donner, written by Woody Allen in his first produced screenplay, and starring Allen in his acting debut, along with Peter Sellers, Peter O'Toole, Romy Schneider, Capucine, Paula Prentiss, and Ursula Andress.

The Academy Award-nominated title song by Burt Bacharach (music) and Hal David (lyrics) is sung by Tom Jones. The film poster was painted by Frank Frazetta, and the animated title sequence was directed by Richard Williams.

The expression "what's new pussycat?" arose from Charles K. Feldman, the producer, overhearing Warren Beatty, who was the original choice for the lead role, answering the phone to a girlfriend and saying "what's up pussycat". In the film, Michael (O'Toole) calls all women "Pussycat" to avoid having to remember their names.

== Plot ==
Notorious womanizer Michael James wants to be faithful to his fiancée Carole Werner, but most women he meets become attracted to him, including neurotic exotic dancer Liz Bien and parachutist Rita, who accidentally lands in his car. His psychoanalyst, Dr. Fritz Fassbender, is unable to help, since he is pursuing patient Renée Lefebvre, who in turn longs for Michael. Carole, meanwhile, decides to make Michael jealous by flirting with his nervous wreck of a friend, Victor Shakapopulis. Victor struggles to be romantic, but Carole nevertheless feigns interest.

Fassbender continues to have group meetings with his neurotics and obsessives and cannot understand why everyone falls for Michael. The group sessions become stranger—including an indoor cricket match. Michael dreams that all his sexual conquests simultaneously bombard him for attention, listing the places where they had sex with him.

One night, Fassbender goes to the Seine, fills a rowing boat with kerosene and wraps himself in the Norwegian flag, preparing to commit suicide in the style of a Viking funeral. Victor, who has set up a small dining table nearby, asks what he is doing. Distracted, Fassbender forgets his idea of suicide and starts giving Victor advice. Despite his attempts to womanize, Fassbender is revealed to be married with three children.

Meanwhile, Carole's plan seems to work and Michael asks to marry her. She agrees and they settle on marrying within the week. She moves in with Michael, but he finds fidelity impossible. When Liz introduces herself as Michael's fiancée, Carole becomes indignant. Simultaneously, Rita parachutes into Michael's open-top sports car and the two check into a small country hotel, though he resists her attempts to seduce him.

Soon, all parties gradually arrive at the hotel; some are checked in, but most simply appear. This includes Carole's parents who wander the corridors, causing Michael to jump from room to room. A rumor also circulates locally that an orgy is taking place at the hotel, so side characters such as the petrol station attendant also surface. Carole arrives and wishes to see Michael's room. As they speak, all the other participants chase each other around in the background. Fassbender's overbearing wife, Anna, tracks him down.

Everyone ends up in Michael's room with most of the women half-naked. As the police arrive outside and form a line, Anna, dressed as a valkyrie and wielding a spear, leads the group through the police. They all escape to a go-kart circuit. They leave the circuit and go first to a farmyard, then through narrow village streets still on the go-karts, then back to the circuit.

After a mayor marries Michael and Carole in a civil marriage ceremony, the couple are signing the marriage certificate when Michael calls the young female registrar "Pussycat", infuriating Carole. They leave and Fassbender attempts to court her instead.

== Cast ==
- Peter Sellers as Dr. Fritz Fassbender
- Peter O'Toole as Michael James
- Romy Schneider as Carole Werner
- Capucine as Renée Lefebvre
- Paula Prentiss as Liz Bien
- Woody Allen as Victor Shakapopulis
- Ursula Andress as Rita, the parachutist
- Eddra Gale as Anna Fassbender, Dr. Fassbender's wife
- Katrin Schaake as Jacqueline
- Éléonore Hirt as Mrs. Sylvia Werner, Carole's mother
- Jean Parédès as Marcel, Renée's husband
- Jacques Balutin as Etienne
- Jess Hahn as Mr. Werner, Carole's father
- Howard Vernon as doctor
- Michel Subor as Philippe
- Sabine Sun as nurse
- Nicole Karen as Tempest
- Jacqueline Fogt as Charlotte
- Daniel Emilfork as gas station man
- Tanya Lopert as Miss Lewis
- Richard Burton as man in strip club (uncredited)
- Françoise Hardy as mayor's secretary (uncredited)

== Production ==
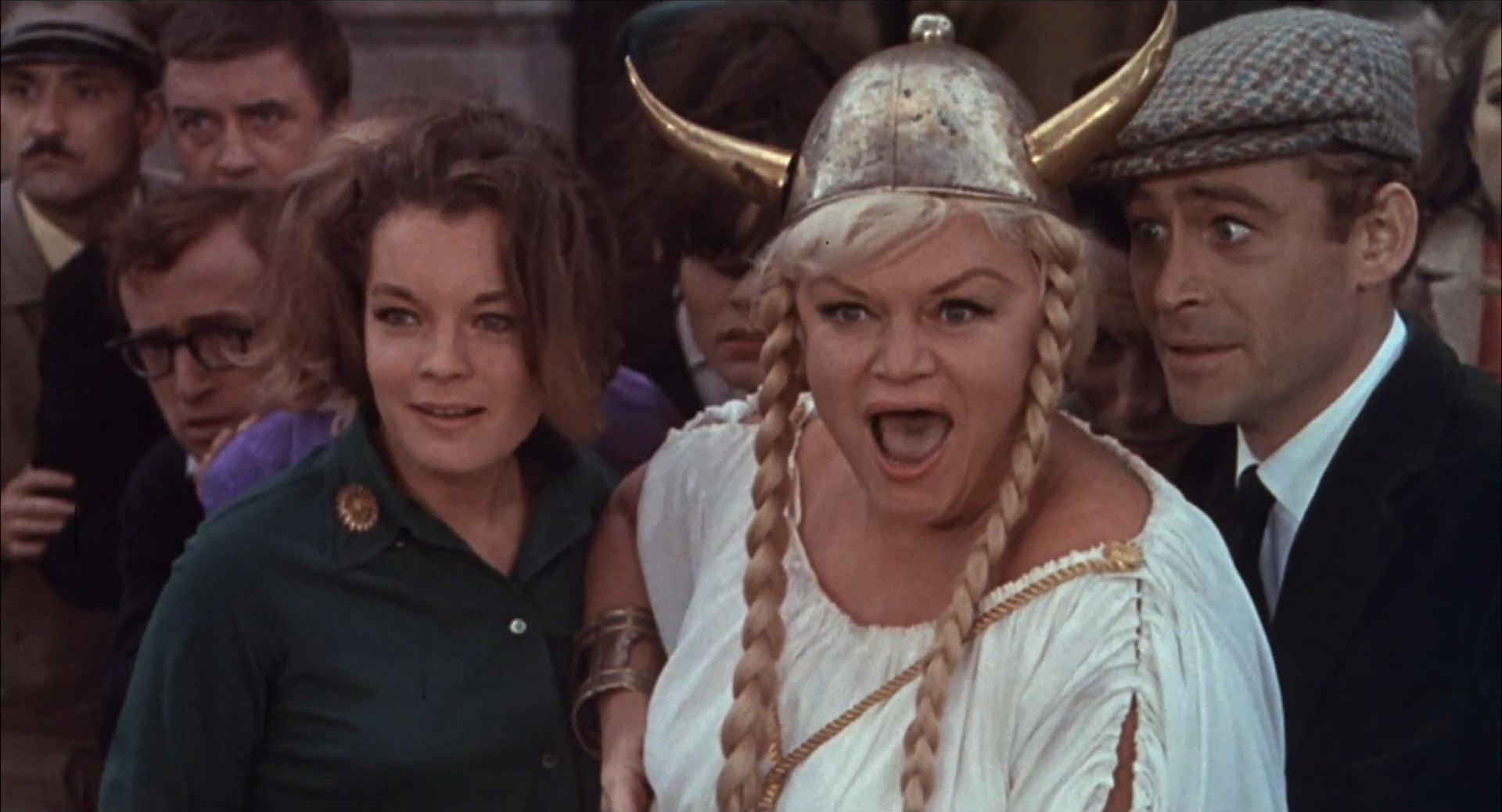
From left to right: Woody Allen, Romy Schneider, Eddra Gale, and Peter O'Toole

Charles Feldman had been developing a script about a Don Juan style figure based on the play Lot's Wife for Cary Grant and Capucine. Warren Beatty wanted to make a comedy film about male sex addiction and hoped Feldman would produce it. The title What's New Pussycat? was taken from Beatty's phone salutation when speaking to his female friends. Beatty desired a role for his then-girlfriend, actress Leslie Caron, but Feldman wanted a different actress.

Beatty and Feldman sought a joke writer and, after seeing him perform in a New York club, Feldman offered Woody Allen $30,000. Allen accepted provided he could also appear in the film. As Allen worked on the script, his first screenplay, Beatty noticed that Allen's role was continually growing at the expense of his own.

Eventually, Beatty threatened to quit the production to stop this erosion, but the actor's status in Hollywood at that time had declined so severely that Feldman decided to let him leave and gave the part to Peter O'Toole. Beatty later said, "I diva'ed my way out of the movie. I walked off of What's New, Pussycat? thinking they couldn't do it without me. I was wrong." According to Beatty, a new screenwriter was brought in and Allen's role was pared back to a minor character.

Groucho Marx was to have played Dr. Fassbender, but at O'Toole's insistence, he was replaced by Peter Sellers. O'Toole, Sellers, and director Clive Donner all made changes to the script, straining their relationship with Allen. Tension was also generated by Sellers' demanding top billing, but O'Toole described the atmosphere as stimulating. Donner was given the job of directing on the strength of Nothing But the Best.

Burt Bacharach composed the score, which was his first film soundtrack. In his book on Bacharach, Serene Dominic writes, "Bacharach's inexperience at film scoring caused him to leave a lot of the work to the last minute." Said Bacharach, "I didn't have a clue. Not a clue. I must've gone in with 40 different themes and recorded them ... I didn't know how to score a picture. And then afterwards Charlie Feldman fell in love with the title song and he took out all these pieces I'd written and stuck in instrumental versions of 'What's New Pussycat?' ... I wanted to take my name off the picture. I was married to Angie (Dickinson) at the time and she said, 'Don't be a fool, this picture's going to be a huge hit.' So I was glad I listened to her." In addition to the title theme, Bacharach and David wrote "Here I Am," sung by Dionne Warwick, and "My Little Red Book", performed by Manfred Mann.

Second unit director Richard Talmadge is credited with creating the karting sequence. Principal photography began on October 13, 1964, and concluded on January 25, 1965, with locations including Paris, Luzarches, Castel Henriette in Sèvres, Château de Chaumontel in Chaumontel, and Billancourt Studios in Boulogne-Billancourt.

== Reception ==
The film was released in New York City on June 22, 1965, and opened in Paris in January 1966 as Quoi de neuf, Pussycat? It grossed $18,820,000 at the domestic box office.

The Monthly Film Bulletin wrote: "Perhaps it was in the hope of breaking with the British sex farce tradition, which has a depressing tendency to involve someone losing his trousers in public, that Clive Donner resorted to an American producer and scriptwriter, with a largely Continental cast. And by shooting in Paris he may have intended that some of the well-known (to the British) sauciness of that city should rub off on to his film. Alas, in spite of its fashionable frenetics and a theme song that shows every sign of making the charts, Pussycat achieves only a kind of desperate daring. Morally it is about as novel as Charley's Aunt, gleefully displaying the wicked joys of sexual licence and then cosily endorsing monogamy. Nevertheless it has a few genuinely funny moments, and the ladies not only look delicious, but make a much better stab at sophistication than their male colleagues."

Boxoffice wrote: "While the screenplay by Woody Allen, nightclub comic who also plays a chief role, never makes any sense the teenagers, the O'Toole and Sellers devotees and entertainment-minded adults will roar and take the nonsensical doings in stride, but it's far too racy for the kiddies."

Variety wrote: "What's New Pussycat? is designed as a zany farce, as wayout as can be reached on the screen. It's all that, and more ... it goes overboard in pressing for its goal and consequently suffers from over-contrived treatment. That there are laughs, sometimes plenty of them, there can be no denying, undeniable clever bits of business, and the windup is fast and crazy. ... Two top stars come off none too happily in their characterizations. Sellers' nuttiness knows no bounds as he speaks with a thick German accent, and O'Toole proves his forte in drama rather than comedy."

Bosley Crowther in The New York Times criticized the script, the directing and the acting and described the film as "the most outrageously cluttered and campy, noisy and neurotic display of what is evidently intended as way-out slapstick". He praised the scenery and title song.

Andrew Sarris in The Village Voice wrote: "I have now seen What's New Pussycat? four times, and each time I find new nuances in the direction, the writing, the playing, and, above all, the music. This is one movie that is not what it seems at first glance. It has been attacked for tastelessness, and yet I have never seen a more tasteful sex comedy."

Filmink called Prentiss "ravishing and hilarious" although she had a nervous breakdown during the making of the movie.

On the review aggregator website Rotten Tomatoes, the film holds an approval rating of 28% based on 18 reviews, with an average rating of 5.1/10.

== Accolades ==
Award	Category	Recipient(s)	Result
Academy Awards	Best Song	"What's New Pussycat?"; Music by Burt Bacharach; lyrics by Hal David	Nominated
Laurel Awards	Top Male Comedy Performance	Peter Sellers	4th place
Laurel Awards	Top Song	"What's New Pussycat?"; Music by Burt Bacharach; lyrics by Hal David	4th place
Writers Guild of America Awards	Best Written American Comedy	Woody Allen	Nominated

== Home media ==
What's New Pussycat? was released on DVD by MGM Home Video on June 7, 2005, as a Region 1 widescreen DVD, on May 22, 2007, as part of The Peter Sellers Collection (film number two in a four-disc set) and on Blu-ray by Kino Lorber on August 26, 2014, as a Region 1 widescreen Blu-ray. It was previously released in VHS.

== Novelization ==
Slightly in advance of the film's release, a paperback novelization of the film was published by Dell Books by crime and western novelist Marvin H. Albert.

== Sequel ==
The 1970 film Pussycat, Pussycat, I Love You was intended as a sequel to this film, and includes much of the same premise of a young man (played by Ian McShane) visiting his psychiatrist to discuss his love life.
