= Édouard Roditi =

American poet (1910–1992)

Édouard Roditi (6 June 1910 – 10 May 1992) was an American poet, short-story writer, critic and translator.

== Literary career ==
A prolific writer, Édouard Roditi published numerous volumes of poetry, short stories, and art criticism starting with Poems for F (Paris: Éditions du Sagitaire, 1935). He was also well regarded as a translator, rendering into English original works from French, German, Spanish, Danish, Portuguese and Turkish. He was, for instance, one of the first to translate the work of French poet Saint-John Perse into English, in a volume published in 1944.

In 1961, he translated Yaşar Kemal's epic novel İnce Memed (1955) under the English title Memed, My Hawk. This book was instrumental in introducing the famed Turkish writer to the English-speaking world. Memed, My Hawk is still in print. Roditi was a cousin of Kemal's wife, Thilda Serrero. Roditi also translated Robert Schmutzler's Art Nouveau (1964) into English, in an edition that is still in print. He also translated such authors as C.P. Cavafy, Paul Celan, Albert Memmi, Fernando Pessoa.

In addition to his poetry and translations, Roditi is perhaps best remembered for the numerous interviews he conducted with modernist artists, including Marc Chagall, Joan Miró, Oskar Kokoschka, Philippe Derome and Hannah Höch. Several of these have been assembled in the collection Dialogues on Art.

Reflecting his wide reading of works on sexuality as well as his personal experience, Roditi also published a book-length essay in French on homosexuality titled De l'homosexualité (Paris: Société des Éditions Modernes/SEDIMO, 1962). The work assesses historical, sociological, religious, medical, legal and literary approaches to the subject; it closes with a seven-page bibliography of sources in French, English and German.

== Upbringing, schooling & early jobs ==
Édouard Roditi's father was a Sephardi Jew from Istanbul who became an American citizen. His mother was of Ashkenazi and Flemish Catholic descent, and a British citizen. He was born in Paris, where his parents had already been living for a number of years.

Roditi grew up in France and attended public school there before going on to study in England at Elstree School, Charterhouse and briefly at Balliol College, Oxford. In 1929, he moved back to Paris, where he frequented the proponents of Surrealism and became a partner in the Surrealist publishing house Éditions du Sagittaire. During this period, he visited the celebrated salon of Gertrude Stein, whom he found "incredibly pretentious" and "rather offensive."

Roditi traveled to the United States in 1929 and 1932, meeting members of the Harlem Renaissance as well as novelist and photographer Carl van Vechten. He returned in 1937 to take a bachelor's degree in Romance languages at the University of Chicago, then went on to do graduate work at the University of California, Berkeley. During World War II, he served in the French short-wave broadcast unit of the United States Office of War Information and as a translator for the State Department and the Defense Department.

Following the war, he served as a multilingual interpreter for the United Nations Charter Conference in San Francisco. He subsequently returned to Europe to work as a freelance interpreter for international organizations and conferences, including the International War Crimes Tribunal at Nuremberg. In 1950, during the "Lavender Scare", he was fired from that job. Roditi was part of the Benton Way Group with Charles Aufderheide.

== Personal life ==
Édouard Roditi was born on 6 June 1910 in Paris, France. He had recognized that he was attracted to other men from an early age, and he actively explored the homosexual milieu of dance halls, bars, bathhouses and public cruising areas in Paris starting in his teen years and continuing in other places where he lived thereafter.

Among Roditi's close friends in France in the early 1930s was the American homosexual poet Hart Crane. In the United States in the late 1930s, Roditi befriended a fellow gay Jewish writer Paul Goodman.

Roditi's first book, Poems for F., printed in 250 copies in 1935, was inspired by a two-year affair with a married man, probably an Austrian painter, 20 years older than the poet. Roditi kept the identity of F. secret to the end of his life.

In his romantic life, Roditi followed an early-20th-century pattern of seeking out partners among men who did not identify as gay. In a 1984 interview, he recalled, "Personally, I have never been particularly attracted to outright homosexuals, and most of my more enjoyable and lasting relationships have been with bisexual or otherwise normal men in whose love life I was an exception."

He considered himself "thrice chosen" by being Jewish, homosexual, and epileptic, as expressed in his anthology titled Thrice Chosen (1981).

He died on 10 May 1992 in Cádiz, Spain

=== Journal articles ===
- Roditi, Édouard (June 1946). "Henri Brémond: Poetics as Mystagogy". The Journal of Aesthetics and Art Criticism. 4 (4): 229–235. doi:10.2307/426531. JSTOR 426531.
