= Leonie Mellinger =

British actress (born 1959)

- Born: 24 June 1959 (age 67); Berlin, Germany
- Education: Royal Central School of Speech and Drama
- Occupations: Actor, Author, Communication Skills Coach
- Years active: 1981–present
- Spouses: Robin Askwith (m. 1988; div. 1991) Anthony Burton (m. 1996)
- Children: 1
- Relatives: Werner Scholem (grandfather)
- Website: https://www.mellinger.co.uk/

Leonie Mellinger (born 24 June 1959) is a German-British actress, podcaster, author and communications skills coach.

== Early life ==
Mellinger was born in the British military hospital neighbouring Spandau Prison as her actor father was then working for Bertolt Brecht's theatre company (the Berliner Ensemble). Her Jewish parents were childhood refugees from Nazi Germany; her grandfather was Werner Scholem, who was killed in Buchenwald.

== Career ==
Mellinger trained at the Central School of Speech and Drama. Her acting debut was as Miriam in the 1981 BBC television serialisation of D.H. Lawrence's Sons and Lovers. In the television serial Small World (1988), based on the novel by David Lodge, she played a central double role portraying the twins Angelica and Lily. Her stage appearances with the Royal Shakespeare Company have included Lavinia in Titus Andronicus and Perdita in The Winter's Tale.

As well as acting, for the past twenty years she has taught communication and personal impact skills at her own training company. From 2017 to 2021 one of her clients was Keir Starmer.

In February 2025 it was reported that Starmer and Mellinger had a face to face coaching session at the Labour Party Headquarters in London on Christmas Eve 2020, in possible violation of COVID lockdown restrictions. This issue was raised in Prime Minister's Questions on 5 February 2025, with the Conservative Party demanding a police investigation.

In The Guardian of March 2, 2025, Mellinger stated that she had broken no lock-down rules and had been a key part of Starmer's wider communications team for several years but claimed she had been a victim of misogyny in parts of the press and on social media.

During Prime Minister's Questions on February 5, 2025, according to Hansard, Starmer stated that on the day in question he was 'working on the expected Brexit deal with my team. We had to analyse the deal as it came in at speed and prepare and deliver a live statement at speed'.

== Personal life ==
Mellinger married actor Robin Askwith in 1988, although they divorced in 1991. She then married Anthony Burton in 1996 and the couple had a daughter, Aurelie, born the same year.

== Podcasts ==
In 2023 Mellinger launched a new podcast series called 'The Courage to Speak'. In each episode she talks to a well known personality about their life and career and issues that have been very important to them to publicly speak about.

Series One Guests (2023) Jon Snow, Juliet Stevenson, David Gower, Dame Carol Black, Hugh Quarshie and Kathy Lette

Series Two Guests (2024) Gary Lineker, Dame Harriet Walter, Peter Tatchell, Lady Helena Kennedy, India Willoughby and Roger Allam

In February 2025 Mellinger and Neil Pearson co-hosted the first episode of the podcast series George Hall at 100 about the life and career of George Hall former Director of Acting at The Central School of Speech and Drama.

== Filmography ==
=== Film ===
Year	Film	Role	Notes
1981	Memoirs of a Survivor	Emily Mary Cartwright	
1983	Ghost Dance	Marianne	
1984	Memed, My Hawk	Hatche	
1984	Summer Lightning	Louise St.Leger	
1985	Zina	German Stenographer	
1988	Young Toscanini	Comparsa	
1992	Hostage	Mrs. Mason	

=== Television ===
Year	Film	Role	Notes
1981	Sons and Lovers	Miriam Leivers	5 episodes
1983	Women	Caroline	Episode: "Whale Music"
1983	BBC Play of the Month	Silvia	Episode: "Infidelities"
1984	Mr. Palfrey of Westminster	Melissa Conyers	Episode: "The Honeypot and the Bees"
1985	Bergerac	Terry	Episode: "Off Shore Trades"
1986	Dead Head	Angela	Episode: "The Patriot"
1987	Paradise Postponed	Francesca Simcox	3 episodes
1988	Hannay	Lady Veronica Strickland	Episode: "The Hazard of the Die"
1988	Small World	Angelica / Lily	5 episodes
1989	The New Statesman	Clarissa	Episode: "May the Best Man Win"
1989	Pride and Extreme Prejudice	Renate	TV film
1990	Screen Two	Claire	Episode: "Children Crossing"
1990	Stay Lucky	Louisa	Episode: "Bigamy Blues"
1992	Maigret	Yvonne Moncin	Episode: "Maigret Sets a Trap"
1992	Lovejoy	Marina	Episode: "The Prague Sun"
1994	Wycliffe	Polly Innes	Episode: "The Tangled Web"
1998	The Bill	Elena	Episode: "Sale or Return: Part 2"
