= Sons and Lovers (TV serial) =

1981 BBC TV serial

Sons and Lovers is a 1981 BBC television serial based on D. H. Lawrence's 1913 book Sons and Lovers. It starred Eileen Atkins, Tom Bell, Karl Johnson, Lynn Dearth and Leonie Mellinger. It was adapted by Trevor Griffiths and directed by Stuart Burge, and originally shown as seven episodes. It aired in the US as part of the PBS's Masterpiece Theatre program in 1982.

Writer Trevor Griffiths said in 1981, "I chose to do this work because, under all the incipient mysticism of the perception, under the incipient derogation of women, under the increasingly ugly politics, there is, in this Lawrence, and vibrantly so, a powerful and radical celebration of dignity in resistance within working-class culture in industrial class-societies; as well as a dark, tortured cry against the waste of human resources such societies require as part of their logic. It is no bad thing to be saying when unemployment has reached over three million.”
