= Dead Head (TV series) =

- Created by: Howard Brenton
- Directed by: Rob Walker
- Starring: Denis Lawson; Lindsay Duncan; George Baker; Simon Callow; Leonie Mellinger
- Composer: Richard Hartley
- Country of origin: United Kingdom
- No. of episodes: 4

Production
- Producer: Robin Midgley
- Running time: 50 Minutes

Original release
- Network: BBC2
- Release: 15 January – 5 February 1986

Dead Head is a four-part crime thriller scripted by Howard Brenton. It juxtaposed 1940s film noir style and costumes with contemporary London settings. It was directed by Rob Walker.

== Plot ==
Petty criminal Eddy Cass (Lawson) receives a mysterious box that proves to contain the head of a young woman. This involves Cass in a conspiracy by the British security services to frame him for the crimes of a sadistic serial murderer of prostitutes.

== Critical reception ==
The Times called it an "intriguing tale," though "neither a pleasant thriller to watch nor to contemplate"; while The Guardian thought it had "lashings of panache and style"; and writing in 1996, the Evening Standard called it the "only British series that came close to Twin Peaks jocular malice."

== Home media ==
The series was released on DVD in the UK on 15 April 2013.
