= Memed, My Hawk (film) =

- Directed by: Peter Ustinov
- Written by: Peter Ustinov
- Based on: Memed, My Hawk by Yaşar Kemal
- Produced by: Brian Smedley-Aston; Fuad Kavur
- Starring: Peter Ustinov; Herbert Lom; Denis Quilley; Simon Dutton; Leonie Mellinger
- Cinematography: Freddie Francis
- Edited by: Peter Honess
- Music by: Manos Hadjidakis
- Production companies: Jadran Film; Ustinov Productions
- Distributed by: The Focus Group
- Release date: 1984
- Countries: United Kingdom; Yugoslavia
- Language: English

Memed, My Hawk is a 1984 British-Yugoslav drama film directed by and starring Peter Ustinov, with Herbert Lom, Denis Quilley and Michael Elphick. It is an adaptation of the 1955 Turkish novel Memed, My Hawk, the debut novel of Yaşar Kemal, nominated for the Nobel Prize in Literature. Memed, My Hawk was filmed in Yugoslavia following the Turkish government's refusal of permission to film- as communist propaganda.

== Plot ==
In 1920s Turkey, Memed, a young peasant, and his childhood sweetheart, Hatçe, are in love. However, a feudal landlord wants the girl for his own son. Consequently, the young lovers elope, and Memed becomes a brigand, now waging war against feudal landlords.

== Cast ==
- Peter Ustinov – Abdi Aga
- Herbert Lom – Ali Safa Bey
- Denis Quilley – Recep
- Michael Elphick – Cabbar
- Simon Dutton – Memed
- Leonie Mellinger – Hatçe
- Siobhán McKenna – Iroz
- Marne Maitland – Süleyman
- Michael Gough – Kerimoglu
- T. P. McKenna – Dursan
- Jeffry Wickham – Captain Faruk
