= John M. Jacobus Jr. =

Art professor (1927–2017)

- Born: September 15, 1927; Poughkeepsie, New York, U.S.
- Died: July 10, 2017 (aged 89)

Academic background
- Education: Yale University

Academic work
- Discipline: Modern art and architecuture
- Institutions: Princeton University; Indiana University

John Maxwell "Jake" Jacobus Jr. (15 September 1927 – 10 July 2017) was Leon E. Williams Professor of Art History, emeritus, at Dartmouth College, New Hampshire, US. He was a specialist in modern art and architecture and particularly the art of Henri Matisse.

== Early life ==
John Jacobus was born in Poughkeepsie, New York, on 15 September 1927 to John M. Jacobus and Louise Jacobus née Rayland. He served in the United States Merchant Marine from which he was discharged in 1947. He received his advanced education at Hamilton College from where he received his AB in 1952, and Yale University from where he received his MA in 1954 and his degree of doctor of philosophy in 1956 for a dissertation on "The Architecture of Viollet-le-Duc". He was a Fulbright scholar in 1954.

== Personal life ==
Jacobus married Marion Townsend in 1952. They had a daughter, Jacquelin. Outside work, Jacobus was fond of opera and photography and travelled widely in pursuit of those interests.

== Career ==
Jacobus was professor of art and architectural history at Princeton University, 1956–1960. He was at the University of California at Berkeley 1960–1963, Indiana University 1963–1969 and Dartmouth College from 1969 where he was professor of art and urban studies. He retired as Leon E. Williams Professor of Art History at Dartmouth in 1999, subsequently receiving the title of professor emeritus. He was a Guggenheim fellow in 1974 in the field of architecture, planning and design.

His first book was a study of the American architect Philip Johnson (1962) in the Makers of Contemporary Architecture series. His second book was a survey of mid-twentieth century architecture published in 1966. With Sam Hunter he produced American Art of the 20th Century (1973) and Modern Art, which had a third edition in 2004/05. His last book was Henri Matisse in the Masters of Art series (1983), a concise edition of his Matisse of 1972.

Jacobus received an honorary AM from Dartmouth College in 1974.

== Death ==
Jacobus died on 10 July 2017. He was survived by his daughter and two grandchildren.

== Selected publications ==
- Philip Johnson. George Braziller, New York, 1962. (Makers of Contemporary Architecture series)
- Twentieth-century architecture: The middle years, 1940–65. Frederick A. Praeger, 1966.
- Matisse. Abrams, New York, 1972.
- American art of the 20th Century: Painting, sculpture, architecture. Prentice Hall/Harry Abrams, 1973. (With Sam Hunter)
- Modern art: Painting, sculpture, architecture. 1976. (With Sam Hunter) (multiple editions)
- Henri Matisse. Harry N. Abrams, New York, 1983; Thames and Hudson, London 1984.

== See also ==
- Eugène Viollet-le-Duc
