= Christophe Lacassagne =

French contemporary baritone (born 1964)

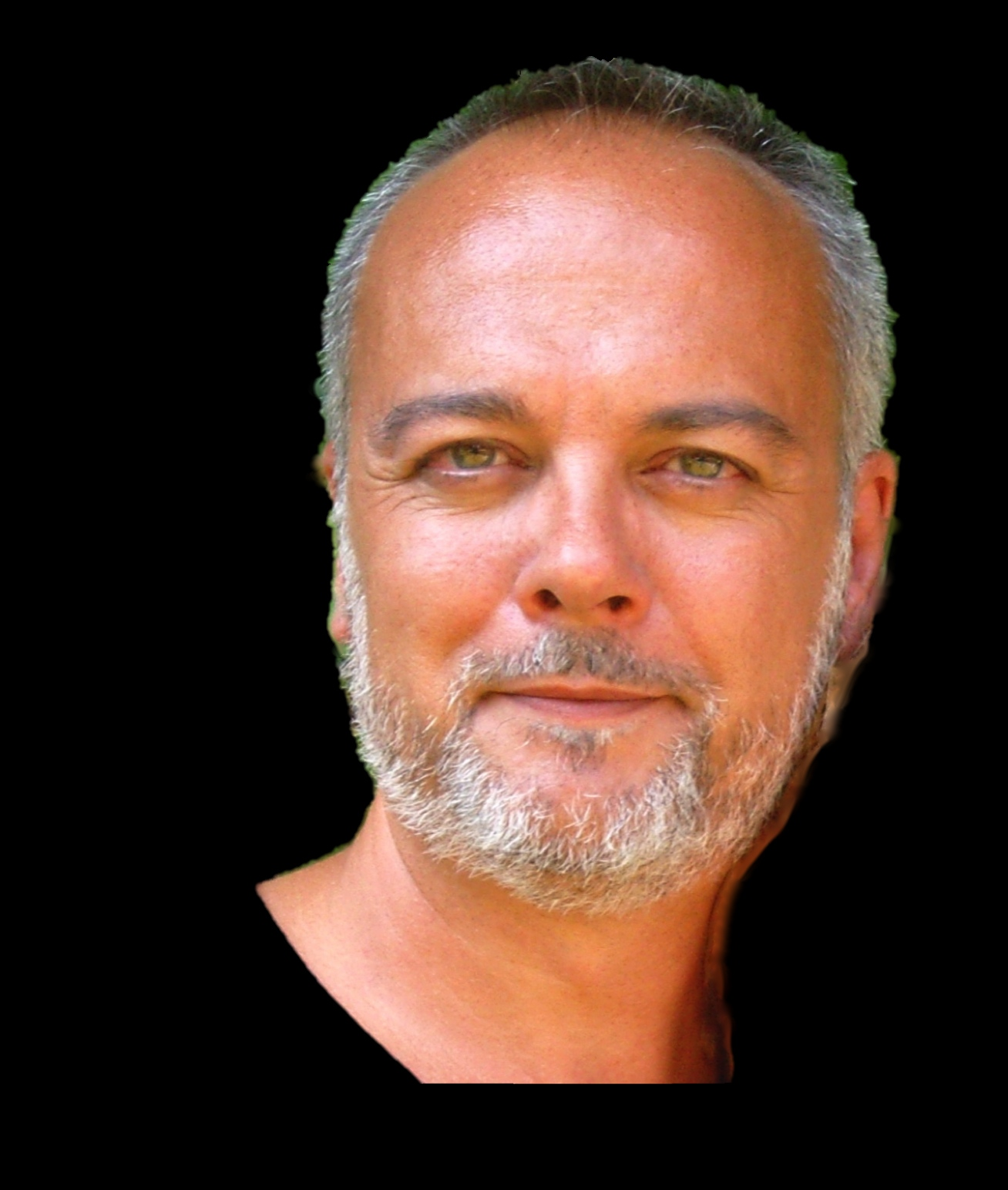
Christophe Lacassagne

Christophe Lacassagne (born 18 August 1964) is a French contemporary baritone.

Born in Tarbes, Lacassagne began training as an actor at the age of 17 under the direction of Mercedes Tormo at the Théâtre du Matin. He then played for 7 years the classical and contemporary repertoire: Molière, Ionesco, Tardieu, Marivaux... At the same time, he pursued university studies in Paris VIII in theatre history of the arts.

At the age of 22, he began studying singing with Gérard Chapuis and then in 1989 entered the CNSMD of Paris in Peter Gottlieb's class. In 1992, he was hired by Jean-Pierre Brosmann as a member of the Opéra national de Lyon troupe. There he made his debut with Papageno in The Magic Flute, Theseus in A Midsummer Night's Dream and Figaro in The Marriage of Figaro. Since then, he has performed on international stages such as the Théâtre de la Monnaie in Brussels, the Bunkamura in Tokyo and the Teatro Lirico of la Scala in Milan. He works with conductors such as Kent Nagano, Peter Eötvös, David Robertson and directors such as Klaus Michael Grüber, Tamas Asscher, Michel Fau, Jean-Pierre Vincent, and Robert Carsen.

Lacassagne has performed more than fifty lyrical or theatrical roles, including the Count of The Marriage of Figaro, Don Giovanni, Escamillo in Carmen, Falstaff, Mackie in The Threepenny Opera and Rigoletto.
