= Charles Aufderheide =

American technician (1918–1991)

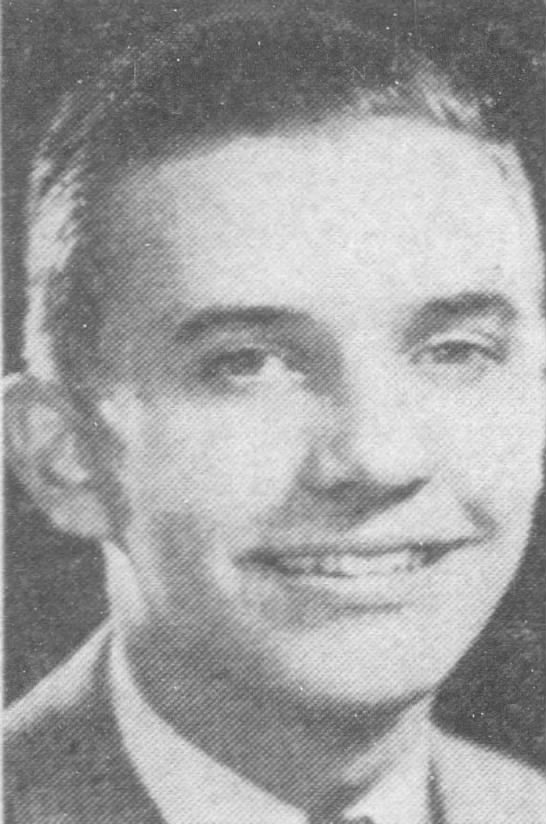
Charles Aufderheide

Charles Aufderheide (March 9, 1918 – May 26, 1991) was an American technician who, with Ruby Bell and the From twins, Isadore "Eddie" and Sam From, was at the center of the Benton Way Group.

== Biography ==
Charles Edward Aufderheide was born on March 9, 1918, in Seymour, Indiana.

He attended Arsenal Technical High School in Indianapolis, Indiana, and in 1934 he represented the school in the league of nations competitive examination. He graduated in 1935, then attended Butler University, and was named giftorian and poet for the annual class.

Aufderheide was a graduate student in the English Department at the University of Chicago in 1938 and 1939. He served in the United States Navy in World War II. After the war he moved to Los Angeles with Ruby Bell and the From twins. Ruby Bell was a librarian; she inherited some money and encouraged a group of her friends, mostly homosexuals, to move with her to Los Angeles. They bought a house on Benton Way where they settled together. Aufderheide began working at Technicolor SA where he remained for thirty years.

According to Alvin Novak, Aufderheide is largely responsible for the longterm harmony of the Benton Way Group, a haven for American intellectuals like the Froms, Paul Goodman, Evelyn Hooker, David Sachs, Fern Maher and Alvin Novak; an exception to the mostly Americans group was Egyptian-born scholar Edouard Roditi. Aufderheide was also friends with Christopher Isherwood and Ned Rorem.

Aufderheide was also a poet, and his friends collected some of his verses in a book that was published after his death, Garden of Games: The Collected Poems.

He died on May 26, 1991. He is buried in Riverview Cemetery, Seymour, Indiana.
