= Edith Hoffmann =

Hungarian art historian and painter (1888–1945)

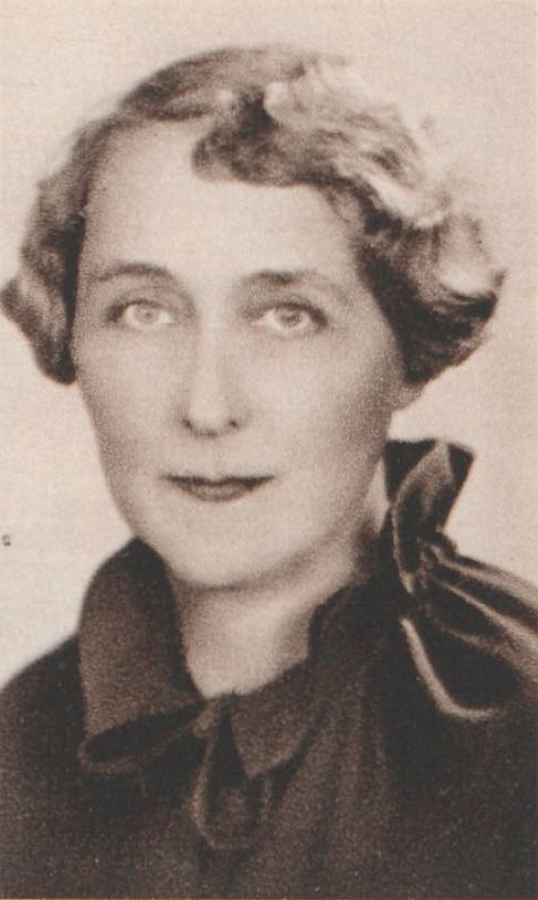
Image of Edith Hoffmann

Edith Hoffmann (7 December 1888, in Brașov – 6 April 1945, in Budapest) was a Hungarian art historian and silhouette painter, best remembered for her publications of the works of Miklós Barabás and her silhouettes of Mihály Babits, Dezső Kosztolányi, and Sándor Sík. A graduate of the University of Vienna and the University of Budapest, she worked as a curator at the Hungarian National Museum and the Museum of Fine Arts.
