= Memed, My Hawk =

1955 novel by Yaşar Kemal

- Author: Yaşar Kemal
- Original title: İnce Memed
- Translator: Edouard Roditi
- Language: Turkish
- Publication date: 1955
- Publication place: Turkey
- English publication date: 1961
- Followed by: They Burn the Thistles

Memed, My Hawk (Turkish: İnce Memed, lit. 'Memed the Slim') is a 1955 novel by Yaşar Kemal. It was Kemal's debut novel and the first novel in his İnce Memed tetralogy. The novel won the Varlık Prize for that year (Turkey's highest literary prize), and earned Kemal a national reputation. In 1961, the book was translated into English by Edouard Roditi, thus gaining Kemal his first exposure to English-speaking readers.

The book earned Kemal the status of one of the most famous Turkish authors internationally.

== Plot ==
Memed, a young boy from a village in Anatolia, is abused and beaten by the villainous local landowner, Abdi Ağa. Having endured great cruelty towards himself and his mother, Döne, Memed finally escapes with his beloved, a girl named Hatçe. Abdi Ağa catches up with the young couple, but only manages to capture Hatçe, while Memed is able to avoid his pursuers and runs into the mountains. There he joins a band of brigands and proceeds to exact revenge on his old adversary. While Memed and the brigands try to protect themselves on a mountain, Hatçe is imprisoned and eventually dies, but not before giving birth to Memed's son, who is also named Memed. When Memed returns to the town, a villager named Hürü Ana tells him he has a "woman's heart" if he surrenders himself. Instead of surrendering and being granted amnesty by the government, he rides into town to find his enemy, on a horse given to him by the townspeople. He finds Abdi Ağa in the south-east corner of his house and shoots him in the chest. The local authorities hear the gunshots, but Memed gets away. He returns to the mountains and gives his son in protection of Iraz, Hatçe's friend from the jailhouse.

== Film adaptation ==
In 1984, the novel was adapted by into a film, directed by and starring Peter Ustinov.
