= Fabio Vacchi =

Italian composer (born 1949)

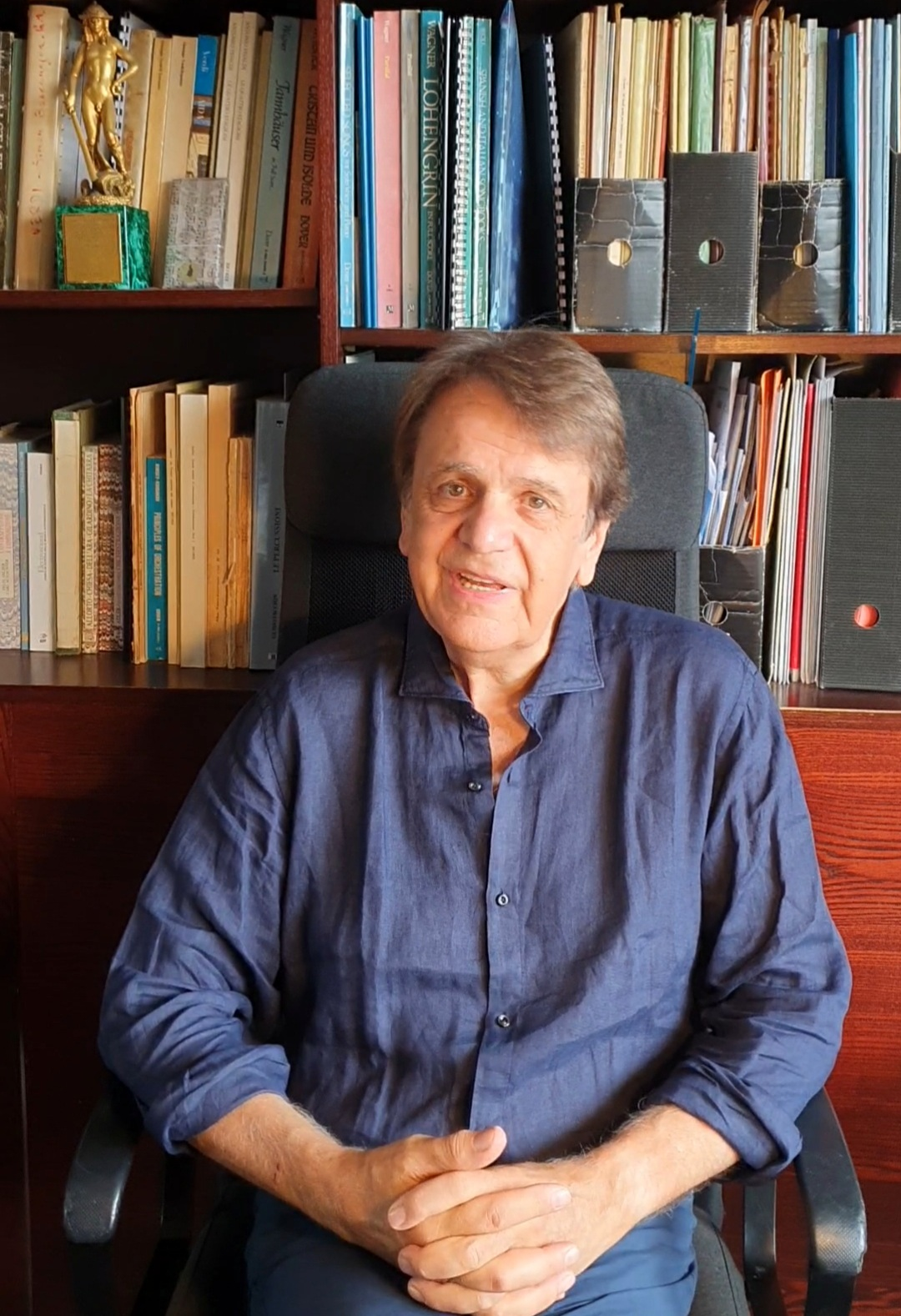
- Vacchi in 2021
- Born: 19 February 1949 (age 77); Bologna, Italy
- Occupation: Music composer
- Years active: 1975–present
- Spouse: Lidia Bramani

Fabio Vacchi (pronounced [ˈfaːbjo ˈvakki]; born 19 February 1949) is an Italian composer.

== Biography ==
=== Training and debut ===
Fabio Vacchi studied at the Conservatorio Giovanni Battista Martini of Bologna with Giacomo Manzoni and Tito Gotti. In 1974 he participated in the courses of the Tanglewood Festival in the United States, where he was awarded the Koussevitzky Prize in Composition. In 1976 he won first prize at the Gaudeamus Composition Competition in the Netherlands, with the work Les soupirs de Geneviève for 11 string soloists. In the same year, he wrote Sinfonia in quattro tempi, conducted by Giuseppe Sinopoli for the Venice Biennale Festival, which thereafter dedicated to him two monographic concerts in 1979 and 1981. In Venice, where he lived from 1984 to 1992, he met and was supported by Luigi Nono, who invited him at the Experimentalstudio der Heinrich-Strobel-Stiftung, Freiburg.

=== From the Maggio Musicale Fiorentino to the Vienna Philharmonic, the Berliner, the Gewandhaus and the Carnegie Hall ===
Vacchi made his debut at the Maggio Musicale Fiorentino Festival in 1982 with Girotondo, an opera whose libretto was adapted from Arthur Schnitzler. Following this opera came Il Viaggio (Teatro Comunale di Bologna, text by Tonino Guerra), – in the same year, 1990, when he attended the New York Festival of Contemporary Music with L'usgnol in vatta a un fil - then La station thermale, with a libretto by Myriam Tanant from Goldoni - produced at Opéra de Lyon (1993), afterwards at La Scala and Opéra Comique de Paris (1995). He also wrote Sacer Sanctus (1997) for chorus and instruments, text by Giuseppe Pontiggia, "a work commissioned by La Scala (1997) and repeated at the Festival of Ravenna (1998), the Festival Présence 2002 in Paris and S. Cecilia in Rome in 2003", En Vinternatt (for a tournée - October–November 2001 - of the Gustav Mahler Chamber Orchestra conducted by Sir Neville Marriner).

For the musical theatre he has subsequently written Les oiseaux de passage (Opéra de Lyon, Teatro Comunale di Bologna, 1998–2001) and, in 2003, Il letto della Storia, with a libretto by Franco Marcoaldi and stage direction by Giorgio Barberio Corsetti. For this opera, he received the Abbiati Prize from the National Association of Italian Critics for the best new work of the year. The partnership with Marcoaldi has continued, bringing about such works as Terra comune (which, at the request of Luciano Berio, inaugurated Rome's Auditorium Parco della Musica in 2002), Tre Veglie commissioned by the Salzburg Festival (conducted in 2000 by Ivan Fischer, with Anna Caterina Antonacci), and the second opera for the Teatro alla Scala, Teneke (2007, chosen for the That's Opera event, on the occasion of the bicentennial of Ricordi, curated by Jean-Jacques Nattiez) conducted by Roberto Abbado, stage direction by Ermanno Olmi, with set design by Arnaldo Pomodoro.

Vacchi's music was again heard at the Salzburg Festival in 2006, during the celebrations of the 250th anniversary of Mozart’s birth, with a performance by Vienna Philharmonic Orchestra under Riccardo Muti of La giusta armonia, a melologue with narrator and orchestra based on a text by the proto-socialist Franz Heinrich Ziegenhagen, who was a friend of Mozart. Worthy of mention is Voci di notte (2006), commissioned by the Orchestra of the Maggio Musicale Fiorentino, on the occasion of the 70th birthday of their conductor Zubin Mehta. Mehta is one of many conductors, such as Berio, Chung, Harding, Marriner, Pappano, and, as already mentioned Muti and Abbado, who have conducted Vacchi's music a number of times.

In 2009 Riccardo Chailly conducted the symphonic melologue Prospero o dell’Armonia (by Shakespeare, Filarmonica della Scala) and in 2011 Tagebuch der Empörung (Leipzig, Gewandhaus Orchestra). Both the symphonic Mare che fiumi accoglie, conducted by Antonio Pappano at the Parco della Musica in Rome, and the opera La madre del mostro, based on a libretto by Michele Serra, date back to 2007. Amos Oz wrote the libretto of the opera The Same Sea for Vacchi, from the novel of the same name, staged at Teatro Petruzzelli in Bari, with scenery by Gae Aulenti, in 2011. Again in collaboration with Amos Oz, he composed the melologue D’un tratto nel folto del bosco, based on a text by Michele Serra from the novel of the same name (Nestled deep in a thick forest) by the Israeli writer, for the Festival Mito (which dedicated a monograph - the first Italian - to Vacchi, in 2014) of 2010. The melologue also travelled to Paris, in 2014 and in a French version (Soudain dans la forêt profonde, Comédie française, Salle Pleyel), with a CD by the Ministère de l'Éducation Nationale, designed for schools in France. In 2015, he composed a symphonic poem, Der Walddämon, again inspired by Nestled Deep in a Thick Forest by Amos Oz and commissioned by Riccardo Chailly, who conducted it at the Gewandhaus in Leipzig. In the same year, Vacchi directed the Atelier Opéra en création at the Aix-en-Provence Festival, where his works were performed between 2014 and 2015, among which Dai calanchi di Sabbiuno conducted by P.Järvi in a concert dedicated to the memory of P.Chereau. In 2016 his ninth opera came out, Lo specchio magico, based on a text by Aldo Nove (staged at the Maggio Musicale Fiorentino, conducted by John Axelrod) and Vencidos for voice and orchestra commissioned by the Festival Internacional Cervantino, in Mexico, for the Miguel de Cervantes celebrations. In 2018 the Teatro San Carlo put on Eternapoli, at the request of Toni Servillo. Again in 2018, after the Concerto for violoncello at Petruzzelli di Bari, the Concerto for violin Natura naturans had its European première at the Opera of Budapest and its American première at the Carnegie Hall in New York, (conductor Balázs Kocsár, soloist Haruka Nagao). In February 2019 the Orchestra laVerdi of Milan devoted four monographic concerts to him, including the Italian première of Natura naturans.

=== Works of social commitment ===
Riccardo Muti conducted Diario dello Sdegno (Teatro alla Scala, 2003), written by Vacchi in the emotional aftermath of 11 September 2001 and the international conflicts that followed. After its première in Milan (2002), this piece was performed in Paris (2003) and Bruxellels, during Italy's turn of holding the presidency of the European Union. Ethical themes have great significance for Vacchi and they are evident in other compositions of his, such as Irini, Esselam, Shalom (2004) for voice, violin and orchestra, which deals with the theme of religious tolerance. Another similar piece was Dai calanchi di Sabbiuno for chamber ensemble, which was composed for the Commemoration of the 50th anniversary of the Italian Resistance (Teatro alla Scala, 1995) and which has been performed more than 100 times around the world, also in the version for full orchestra requested by Claudio Abbado. Ethical themes are still central in other recent works. In 2017 the melologue Veronica Franco was performed at Teatro la Fenice in Venice, about the great Venetian poet, courtesan, and proto-feminist who defeated the Inquisition of the 16th century with her free spirit. The Teatro alla Scala will be staging in May 2020 the premiere of Madina, Theater-Dance (whose text of Emmanuelle de Villepin focuses on the theme of terrorism), for actor, soprano, tenor, choir, orchestra and dance troupe with Roberto Bolle étoile, Was Beethoven African?, inspired by Nadine Gardimer's anti-racism novel and commissioned by the Philharmonie de Paris and the Paris Mozart Orchestra had been performed at the Philharmonie, Paris, on 18, 19, 20 September 2020, obligatory piece in the international competition La Maestra. The mock-heroic opera Jeanne Dark, from Voltaire's Pucelle d’Orléans, that will be staged at Maggio Musicale Fiorentino, 22–26 May 2021, reflects his rebellion against dogmatic thinking. Again in May 2021, the melologue Beethoven l’Africain. Lettres de Prison de Nelson Mandela, commissioned by PMO, will be performed at Philharmonie de Paris and then at Festival Internacional Cervantino, in Mexico

=== Chamber works and soundtracks ===
On a commission from Abbado, Vacchi composed Briefe Büchners, a Lieder cycle which was performed by the Berliner Philharmonie in 1998. For the Hilliard Ensemble and the Barrow River Art Festival, he composed Memoria italiana in 2013. Luoghi immaginari were composed between 1987 and 1992 for various instrumental formations - performed many times, conducted also by Daniel Harding in Salzburg Mozarteum or in the Festival of Italian Contemporary Music in Beijing - and was included, along with other works by Vacchi, in the soundtrack to Il Mestiere delle Armi (The Profession of Arms) by Ermanno Olmi. For this movie, Vacchi was awarded the David di Donatello prize in 2002. 2005 saw him honoured again at The Albo D'Oro RDC Awards, for his music in Patrice Chéreau’s film Gabrielle. Also by Vacchi is the soundtrack to Olmi's latest works One Hundred Nails (2007), and Vedete, sono uno di voi (2017). The Quartetto di Cremona has performed his four String Quartets many times. The Third String Quartet (2002), written for the Tokyo String Quartet, was awarded the Annual Lully Award in 2003 for the best new work of the year performed in the United States, and the Fourth Quartet (2004), was commissioned by RAI Radio for the 80th anniversary of Italian radio) and asked him to write the sixth, which will be performed at Società del Quartetto di Milano, 9 February 2021.

=== Other news ===
Worthy of mention is the recent Voci di notte (2006), commissioned and performed by the Orchestra of the Maggio Musicale Fiorentino, on occasion of the 70th birthday of their conductor Zubin Mehta. For Beethoven celebrations of 2020, Vacchi has written Beethoven e la primavera ritrovata for orchestra, commissioned from Maggio Musicale Fiorentino and conducted by Zubin Mehta.

== Poetics ==
As Peter Korfmacher wrote in the Leipziger Volkszeitung about his Tagebuch der Empörung at Gewandhaus, focusing on the events of 11 September 2001, "Vacchi does not describe any attack, nor war. His metaphysical approach is certainly comparable to that of Gustav Mahler: very diverse material is inserted into a broad range, so that meanings which may be felt on an emotional level but not expressible with words are revealed."

== Style ==
Claudio Abbado defines his style "complex and not derivative, and capable of reaching the listener" and Jean Jacques Natties declares that his music "can furnish a sense of direction for composers in this new century. Thanks to Fabio Vacchi for having known how to chart – for the music enthusiast and the composer alike – an innovative course."

So, "Vacchi’s music is characterized in particular by its quality of sound; fluid, refined and shimmering, subtly nuanced and suggestive of echoes and reverberations. The rigour of compositional procedures is tied to a concern to create a communicative idiom which takes into consideration the listener’s perceptive ability."

== Prizes and acknowledgements ==
- Koussevitsky Prize in Composition (Tanglewood, 1974)
- The Gaudeamus International Composers Award for the entry Les soupirs de Geneviève (Netherlands, 1976)
- David di Donatello for Best Score of the year, for Ermanno Olmi’s The Profession of Arms (Rome, 2002)
- Annual Lully Award for the best new work of the year performed in the United States, for the Third String Quartet, commissioned by the Tokyo String Quartet (2002)
- The Abbiati Prize from the Associazione Nazionale Critici Musicali for the best new work of the year for the opera Il letto della storia (2003)
- RDC Award for the best soundtrack, for Patrice Chéreau’s Gabrielle (2005)
- Active Member of the Accademia Nazionale di Santa Cecilia
- Honorary Member of the Accademia Filarmonica of Bologna

== Discography ==
Title	Soloists	Orchestra / Ensemble	Conductors	Release	Label
Luoghi immaginari	Marco Lazzara	EnsembleMusica20	Guido Guida, Mauro Bonifacio	1996	BMG Ricordi CRMCD 1043
Suite in "2xMöller"	Duo2xM	-	-	1996	nosag CD 054
La station thermale	Cécile Besnard, Christophe Lacassagne, Pomone Epoméo, Catherine Renerte	Orchestre de l'Opéra de Lyon	Claire Gibault	1998	BMG Ricordi 74321356142 (2 CDs)
Wanderer Oktett – Dionysos	-	Orchestra Sinfonica Siciliana, Contempoartensemble, Agon Acustica Informatica Musica	Emilio Pomarico, Mauro Ceccanti	2000	Stradivarius STR 33597
Movimento di quartetto in "Quartetti per archi: Schubert, Vacchi, Ligeti"	-	Quartetto Savinio	-	2004	Paragon, CD supplement for Amadeus magazine, June 2004 SMF 001-2
Gabrielle	Raina Kabaivanska, Pavel Vernikov	Orchestra Sinfonica di Milano "G.Verdi"	Claire Gibault	2005	Sony BMG 82876730902
Quintetto in "Rotte sonore"	-	Dedalo Ensemble	Vittorio Parisi	2007	Stradivarius STR 33747
Mignon (Über die Sehnsucht) in "La voce contemporanea in Italia vol.3"	Tiziana Scandaletti, Riccardo Piacentini	-	-	2007	Stradivarius STR 33769
Luoghi immaginari	Marco Lazzara	EnsembleMusica20, Orchestra Sinfonica Siciliana	Guido Guida, Mauro Bonifacio	2007	Stradivarius STR 57005

== See also ==
- List of compositions by Fabio Vacchi
- Teneke (opera)
