= Teneke (opera) =

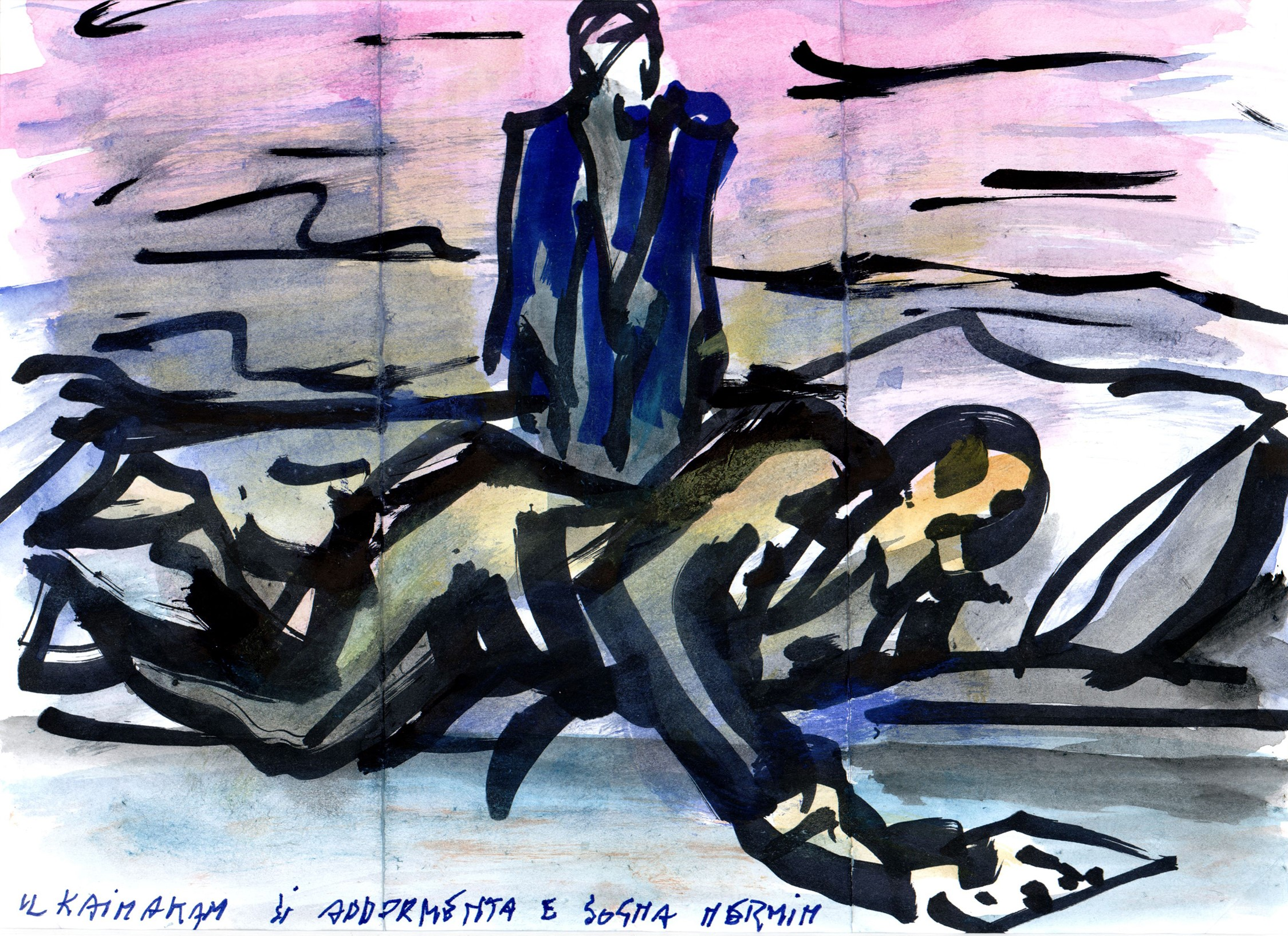
Il Kaimakan si addormenta e sogna Nermin, drawing for Teneke (undated).

Teneke is an opera in three acts by Italian composer Fabio Vacchi.

Franco Marcoaldi adapted the Italian libretto from the eponymous novel by the Turkish author Yaşar Kemal published in 1955. The opera was premiered on September 22, 2007, at the Teatro alla Scala of Milan, conducted by Roberto Abbado. Set designs and costumes were by Arnaldo Pomodoro, and Ermanno Olmi was the stage director. It was staged until October 4, 2007, seven times only. Running time is approximately 2 hours and 45 minutes.

== Synopsis ==
=== Act I ===
Çukurova region in southern Anatolia, Turkey, in the 1950s. Resul Efendi, who is standing in for the newly appointed Kaymakam until he arrives, is an honest man. But he is incapable of opposing the arrogance of the rice growers, who are pressing to obtain their seasonal permits. Threatened, he is playing for time when the Doctor rushes in announcing that the Kaymakam has arrived.

Fikret Irmaklï, a young man in his first post, is greeted by the notables, headed by the rich Okçuoglu. The festive welcome clashes with the desolate picture of the countryside, described to one side by the peasant farmers. The very green young Kaymakam is easily swindled, however much the Doctor may try to explain the damage caused by rice, mosquitoes and malaria.

Irmaklï re-enters in a very good mood, whistling Beethoven’s Ode to Joy. At home, he finds a letter from his fiancée Nermin, who is studying in Europe. The letter seems to be animated by the girl’s own voice. Homesickness and a pining for her far-off beloved are not enough to dampen her hopes that their people may unite their destiny with that of the West.

=== Act II ===
Fikret signs the permits, without suspecting anything. Okçuoglu waxes lyrical on the benefits of progress and the cultivation of rice – so much more profitable than traditional crops. He omits to mention, however, that he intends also to flood the village of Sazlïdere, where the peasant farmers will have no escape from malaria. Nermin, as an absent ringleader, makes ironic comments on these fine words.

Okçuoglu summons the tenant-farmers, to take their land in exchange for their products. The only one, who dares oppose the overbearing landowner is Memed Ali, a Kurd and ex-mountain bandit. Memed accuses Okçuoglu of corrupting the officials, and declares that he will not be selling an inch of his land.

Resul is consumed by the thought that the peasants believe Irmaklï to be corrupt. Incited by the Doctor, he eventually decides to inform him of the agrarian regulations. Irmaklï is dejected and flings himself on to his bed. He falls into a heavy sleep and in a dream Nermin appears, consoles him and spurs him to fight for the law to be respected. Driven by a fresh inner strength, the Kaymakam issues new orders. To start with, he immediately leaves the comfortable house placed at his disposal by the absentee landlords, and settles instead into his office.

In the meantime Okçuoglu has flooded the village, leaving men and animals in the mire. The old lady of the community, Zeyno Karï, incites Memed to rebel. Despite his fury, the Kurd knows he has no way out if he should kill Okçuoglu. A melancholy song drifts from his hut by day and by night. In her disdain, Zeyno leads the peasants’ protest as they march, covered in mud, to the Kaymakam's office.

=== Act III ===
Irmaklï revokes the permits, unleashing the owners’ wrath. With bitter skepticism, Nermin's voice remarks that the law tends, as a rule, to lose in any clash with power. The Kaymakam puts soldiers to guard the sluice gates and prevent irrigation. Resul is scared of the consequences of an action that will jeopardize the harvest. But the Doctor bursts into the room to say that Okçuoglu has bribed the guards and a river of water is pouring into the fields. Isolated by now, Irmaklï refuses to give in, whilst in dismay Resul and the Doctor observe his hopeless temerity.

The young man's mind turns sadly back to his student days. His nostalgia for Nermin throws him almost into dejection, as he considers his hard struggle waged alone. Nermin cheers him up and tries to infuse courage into him, in the name of justice and of the suffering people. Irmaklï takes heart again and rouses himself, in the certitude that the law and love are on his side.

All attempts to convince the Kaymakam having failed, the notables’ hatred blazes. The authorities are swamped with letters full of slander. In the end, the growers decide to flood the fields without permission, whilst a delegation sets out for Ankara to obtain Irmaklï's dismissal. At the same time Zeyno and the peasant women, covered in mud from head to foot, demand the right to live in human conditions. To save the village, the women have resolved to use their shovels to block the sluices. Okçuoglu offers money to the peasants if they will leave their homes. Zeyno urges the men to resist, but in vain. Resigned by now, the peasants accept the offer and in exchange the landowner demands the immediate resumption of irrigation. The village, according to him, no longer exists. Memed alone, having resolved not to budge from his hut, will not yield to this blackmail. Meanwhile, Irmaklï has been taken ill, as have the majority of the peasants. Men, women and children from the surrounding villages crowd around the surgeries.

The notables return in triumph from Ankara, while an exultant crowd pours into the streets. The Kaymakam is to be transferred and Resul will take up his temporary post again. Compelled to accept defeat, Irmaklï departs, having decided to resume elsewhere the struggle for a more just world. He is ideally backed by the Kurd, Resul and the Doctor, as well as by Nermin, who feels certain that together they will come back to fight with their energy intact. The din raised by the teneke, the big tin drums, scornfully accompanies the Kaymakam's departure. In the middle of the crowd, a man covered in mud tries to attract attention. He is Memed the Kurd, who has come to say goodbye to Irmaklï. The chorus bitterly decrees that the law is of no avail whatever; that force is what governs the world. The finale, entrusted to the music alone, remains however open. Injustice and the arrogance of the powerful have gained the upper hand, but only for the time being. Today's defeat may turn into victory tomorrow, the struggle between good and evil is not a foregone conclusion.

== Roles ==
Role	Voice type	Premiere Cast, September 22, 2007 (Conductor: Roberto Abbado)
Nermin	Soprano	Rachel Harnisch
Fikret Irmakli	Tenor	Steve Davislim
Resul Efendi	Baritone	Andrea Concetti
Memed the Kurd	Baritone	Alessandro Paliaga
Zeyno Karï	Mezzo-soprano	Anna Smirnova
Okçuoglu	Bass	Nicola Ulivieri
The Doctor	Baritone	Angelo Veccia
12 Landowners		Luca Dellacasa, Krystian Krzeszowiak, Giovanni Caccamo, Luca Favaron, Leonardo Andreotti, Vito Martino, Roberto Lizzio, Davide Rocca, Filippo Tuccimei, Nicolás Lartaun, Emilio Casali, Riccardo Ristori
The Farmers		Chorus of the Teatro alla Scala of Milan

== Premiere ==
Yaşar Kemal attended the premiere together with his wife Ayşe Semiha Baban Kemal and the Turkish Diva Leyla Gencer in the royal box. After the performance, he took a bow along with the cast, and received a loud applause from the audience.
