= Yaşar Kemal =

Turkish writer and activist (1923–2015)

- Born: Kemal Sadık Gökçeli; 6 October 1923; Gökçedam, Osmaniye, Turkey
- Died: 28 February 2015 (aged 91); Istanbul, Turkey
- Occupation: Novelist
- Spouses: Thilda Serrero (m. 1952; died 2001) Ayşe Semiha Baban (m. 2002)
- Writing career
- Period: 1943–2002
- Notable works: Ağıtlar ("Ballads"; debut); İnce Memed ("Memed, My Hawk"); Teneke ("The Drumming-Out"); Ince Memed II ("They Burn the Thistles")
- Notable awards: Prix du Meilleur Livre Etranger 1979; Prix mondial Cino Del Duca 1982; Commandeur de la Légion d'Honneur de France 1984; Friedenspreis des Deutschen Buchhandels 1997; Grand Officier de la Légion d'Honneur de France 2011

Yaşar Kemal (Turkish pronunciation: [ˈjaʃaɾ ceˈmal]; born Kemal Sadık Gökçeli; 6 October 1923 – 28 February 2015) was a leading Turkish writer of Kurdish descent and a human rights activist. He received 38 awards during his lifetime and had been a candidate for the Nobel Prize in Literature on the strength of his 1955 novel Memed, My Hawk.

An outspoken intellectual, he often did not hesitate to speak about sensitive issues, especially those concerning the oppression of the Kurdish people. He was tried in 1995 under anti-terror laws for an article he wrote for Der Spiegel highlighting the Turkish Army's destruction of Kurdish villages during the Turkish–Kurdish conflict. He was released but later received a suspended 20-month jail sentence for another article he wrote criticising racism in Turkey, especially against the Kurds.

== Early life and education ==
Yaşar Kemal was born Kemal Sadık Gökçeli to Sadık and Nigâr on 6 October 1923 in Hemite (now Gökçedam), a Turkmen hamlet in the province of Osmaniye in southern Turkey. He was born into the only Kurdish family in the village but didn't face discrimination despite his ethnic difference. Kemal had a difficult childhood, and his family had to flee from Van province to Diyarbakır province. From there, they were deported to Adana province. He lost his right eye in a knife accident while his father was slaughtering a sheep for Eid al-Adha. When he was five years old he witnessed his father being stabbed to death by his adoptive son Yusuf while praying in a mosque. These traumatic experiences left Kemal with a speech impediment, which lasted until he was twelve years old. At nine, Kemal began school in a neighbouring village; he continued his formal education in Kadirli in Osmaniye province.

Kemal was a locally noted bard even before he began school but was unappreciated by his widowed mother until he composed an elegy on the death of one of her eight brothers, all of whom were bandits. He became interested in writing as a means to record his work after talking to an itinerant peddler, who was doing his accounts. His village paid his way to university in Istanbul.

He worked for a while for rich farmers as a labourer in the Çukurova cotton fields, ostensibly guarding river water against poor farmers' unauthorised use for irrigation. However, he actually taught the poor farmers how to steal the water undetected, by taking it at night. Later he worked as a letter-writer, then as a journalist, and finally as a novelist. The Turkish police confiscated his first two novels. In 1950, Kemal was imprisoned for alleged communist activities. He visited Akdamar Island in 1951, where he saw the beginning of the planned demolition of the island's Holy Cross Church. Using his contacts, he helped stop the demolition (the church was restored by the Turkish government in 2005).

== Professional and political career ==
He then moved to Istanbul to work for the Cumhuriyet newspaper, where he adopted his pen name.

In 1962, Kemal joined the Workers Party of Turkey (TİP) and "served as one of its leaders until quitting after the Soviet invasion of Czechoslovakia in 1968". In 1967, Kemal established the Marxist magazine Ant together with Dogan Özgüden and Fethi Naci. The magazine published articles about Engels, Marx, Ho Chi Minh and Che Guevara. In the aftermath of the military coup in 1971, the magazine was closed during the crackdown on left-wing politicians. Because of the spate of political assassinations during the 1976–1980 political violence in Turkey, Kemal moved to Sweden for a time. He was often arrested for his political activities. In 1995, he was prosecuted for making separatist propaganda after writing an article for Index on Censorship, because of his support for Kurdish dissidents. He was sentenced to 20 months and received a suspended sentence in March 1996. In December 2000, he was involved in negotiations over the hunger strikes against the F-Type prisons.

== Later years and death ==
On 14 January 2015, Kemal was hospitalised at Istanbul University's Çapa Medical Faculty, due to respiratory insufficiency. During the afternoon of 28 February 2015, he died in the intensive care unit, where he had been admitted for multiple organ dysfunction syndrome, Following a religious funeral service held at Teşvikiye Mosque, attended by former Turkish president Abdullah Gül, political party leaders, high-ranking officials and an enormous assembly of mourners, he was buried on 2 March 2015 beside his first wife Thilda's grave in Zincirlikuyu Cemetery. Kemal was survived by his wife Ayşe Semiha Baban and his adoptive son, visual artist Ahmet Güneştekin.

== Works ==
I don't write about issues, I don't write for an audience, I don't even write for myself. I just write.

— Interview with The Guardian

In 1943 Kemal published his first book Ağıtlar ("Ballads"), a compilation of folkloric themes. This book brought to light many long-forgotten rhymes and ballads, which he had begun to collect at the age of sixteen. He penned his first tale Pis Hikaye ("The Dirty Story") in 1944 while serving in the military in Kayseri. His stories Bebek ("The Baby"), Dükkancı ("The Shopkeeper") and Memet ile Memet ("Memet and Memet") were published in 1950. Then he published a book of short stories Sarı Sıcak ("Yellow Heat") in 1952. His books initially focused on the lives, sufferings and toil of the people of the Çukurova plain. Kemal used the legends and stories of Anatolia extensively as the basis for his works.

In 1955 he received international acclaim with the publication of Memed, My Hawk (Turkish: İnce Memed). In this book, Kemal criticised the fabric of society via a protagonist who flees to the mountains as a result of the oppression of the ağas. Kemal won nineteen literary prizes over his lifetime, and was nominated for the Nobel Prize in Literature in 1973 by Dag Strömbäck and Per Wästberg. The novel was adapted into a 1984 film of the same name, starring Peter Ustinov.

His 1955 novel Teneke was adapted into a theatrical play, which ran for almost a year in Gothenburg, in Sweden, the country in which he lived for about two years in the late 1970s. Italian composer Fabio Vacchi adapted the same novel with its original title into a three-act opera, which premiered at the Teatro alla Scala in Milan, Italy, in 2007.

== Personal life ==
In 1952, Yaşar Kemal married Thilda Serrero, a member of a prominent Sephardi Jewish family in Istanbul. Her grandfather, Jak Mandil Pasha, was the chief physician of the Ottoman Sultan Abdul Hamid II. She translated seventeen of her husband's works into English. In 2001 Thilda predeceased Yaşar, dying, aged 78, from pulmonary complications in an Istanbul hospital. She was buried in Zincirlikuyu Cemetery. Thilda was also survived by her son Raşit Göğçel and a grandchild.

Yaşar Kemal remarried on 1 August 2002. His second spouse was Ayşe Semiha Baban, a lecturer in public relations at Istanbul Bilgi University in Istanbul who had been educated at the American University of Beirut, Boğaziçi University and Harvard University.

== Bibliography ==
Stories

- Sarı Sıcak ("Yellow Heat") (22 stories, 1952).

Novellas

- Teneke (The Drumming-Out) (1955)
- Kuşlar da Gitti (The Birds Have Also Gone) (1978)

Novels

- İnce Memed (Memed, My Hawk) (1955)
- Orta Direk (The Wind from the Plain) (1960)
- Yer Demir Gök Bakır (Iron Earth, Copper Sky) (1963)
- Ölmez Otu (The Undying Grass) (1968)
- İnce Memed II (They Burn the Thistles) (1969)
- Akçasazın Ağaları/Demirciler Çarşısı Cinayeti (The Agas of Akchasaz Trilogy/Murder in the Ironsmiths Market) (1974)
- Akçasazın Ağaları/Yusufcuk Yusuf (The Agas of Akchasaz Trilogy/Yusuf, Little Yusuf) (1975)
- Yılanı Öldürseler (To Crush the Serpent) (1976)
- Al Gözüm Seyreyle Salih (The Saga of a Seagull) (1976)
- Deniz Küstü (The Sea-Crossed Fisherman) (1978)
- Yağmurcuk Kuşu/Kimsecik I (Kimsecik I – Little Nobody I (1980); also published as "Salman the Solitary" (1997)
- Hüyükteki Nar Ağacı (The Pomegranate on the Knoll) (1982)
- İnce Memed III (1984)
- Kale Kapısı/Kimsecik II (Kimsecik II – Little Nobody II)(1985)
- İnce Memed IV (1987)
- Kanın Sesi/Kimsecik III (Kimsecik III – Little Nobody III) (1991)
- Fırat Suyu Kan Akıyor Baksana (Look, the Euphrates is Flowing with Blood) (1997)
- Karıncanın Su İçtiği (Ant Drinking Water) (2002)
- Tanyeri Horozları (The Cocks of Dawn) (2002)

Epic novels

- Üç Anadolu Efsanesi (Three Anatolian Legends) (1967)
- Ağrıdağı Efsanesi (The Legend of Mount Ararat) (1970) – the base of the opera Ağrı Dağı Efsanesi 1971
- Binboğalar Efsanesi (The Legend of the Thousand Bulls) (1971)
- Çakırcalı Efe* (The Life Stories of the Famous Bandit Çakircali) (1972)

Reportages

- Yanan Ormanlarda 50 Gün (Fifty Days in the Burning Forests) (1955)
- Çukurova Yana Yana (While Çukurova Burns) (1955)
- Peribacaları (The Fairy Chimneys) (1957)
- Bu Diyar Baştan Başa (Collected reportages) (1971)
- Bir Bulut Kaynıyor (Collected reportages) (1974)
- Allahın Askerleri (God's Soldiers) (1978)

Experimental works

- Ağıtlar (Ballads) (1943)
- Taş Çatlasa (At Most) (1961)
- Baldaki Tuz (The Salt in the Honey) (1959–74 newspaper articles)
- Gökyüzü Mavi Kaldı (The Sky remained Blue) (collection of folk literature in collaboration with S. Eyüboğlu)
- Ağacın Çürüğü (The Rotting Tree) (Articles and Speeches) (1980)
- Yayımlanmamış 10 Ağıt (10 Unpublished Ballads) (1985)
- Sarı Defterdekiler (Contents of the Yellow Notebook) (Collected Folkloric works) (1997)
- Ustadır Arı (The Expert Bee) (1995)
- Zulmün Artsın (Increase Your Oppression) (1995)

Children's books

- Filler Sultanı ile Kırmızı Sakallı Topal Karınca (The Sultan of the Elephants and the Red-Bearded Lame Ant) (1977)

== Awards and distinctions ==
=== Literature prizes ===
- "Seven Days in the World's Largest Farm" reportage series, Journalist's Association Prize, 1955
- Varlik Prize for Ince Memed ("Memed, My Hawk"), 1956
- Ilhan Iskender Award for the play adapted from his book of the same name, Teneke ("The Drumming-Out"), 1966
- The International Nancy Theatre Festival – First Prize for Uzun Dere ("Long Brook"), 1966 -Theater adaptation from roman Iron Earth, Copper Sky.
- Madarli Novel Award for Demirciler Çarşısı ("Murder in the Ironsmith's Market"), 1974
- Choix du Syndicat des Critiques Littéraires pour le meilleur roman etranger (Eté/Automne 1977) pour Terre de Fer, Ciel de Cuivre ("Yer Demir, Gök Bakır")
- Prix du Meilleur Livre Etranger 1978 pour L'Herbe qui ne meurt pas (Ölmez Otu); Paris, Janvier 1979.
- Prix mondial Cino Del Duca decerné pour contributions a l'humanisme moderne; Paris, Octobre 1982.
- The Sedat Simavi Foundation Award for Literature; Istanbul, Turkey, 1985.
- Premi Internacional Catalunya. Catalonia (Spain), 1996
- Lillian Hellman/Dashiell Hammett Award for Courage in Response to Repression, Human Rights Watch, USA, 1996.
- Stig Dagerman Prize (Swedish: Stig Dagermanpriset), Sweden, 1997.
- Friedenspreis des Deutschen Buchhandels, Frankfurt, Germany, 1997.
- International Nonino Prize for his collected works, Italy, 1997
- Bordeaux, Prix Ecureuit de Littérature Etrangère, 1998
- Z. Homer Poetry Award, 2003
- Savanos Prize (Thessaloniki-Greece), 2003
- Turkish Publishers' Association Lifetime Achievement Award, 2003
- Presidential Cultural and Artistic Grand Prize, 2008
- The Bjørnson Prize (Norwegian: Bjørnsonprisen), Norway, 2013.

=== Decorations ===
- Commandeur de la Légion d'Honneur de France; Paris, 1984.
- Commandeur des Arts et des Lettres, Paris, 1989.
- Grand Officier de la Légion d'Honneur de France; Paris, 2011.
- Krikor Naregatsi Medal of Armenia, 2013.

=== Honorary doctorates ===
- Doctor Honoris Causa, Strasbourg University, France, 1991.
- Doctor Honoris Causa, Akdeniz University, Antalya, Turkey, 1992.
- Honorary Doctorate, Bilkent University, Ankara, Turkey, 2002
- Honorary Doctorate, Çukurova University, Adana, Turkey, 2009
- Honorary Doctorate, Boğaziçi University, Istanbul, Turkey, 2009
- Honorary Doctorate, Istanbul Bilgi University, Istanbul, Turkey, 2014
