= Pezza =

Pezza may refer to:

- Pezza (surname), Italian surname
- Turinelli & Pezza, an Italian electric car manufactured only in 1899.
- Piani di Pezza, a glacial-karstic-alluvial plain in the province of L'Aquila, Abruzzo, central Italy
- Uomo di pezza, an album by the Italian progressive rock band Le Orme
- Michele Pezza, an Italian guerilla leader, aka: Fra Diavolo

== See also ==
- Pezzi (disambiguation)
- Monte Pezza
