= Giulietta Pezzi =

Italian writer and journalist (1810-1878)

- Portrait of Giulietta Pezzi by Giovanni Spertini
- Born: Giulia Giuseppina Pezzi; 10 February 1810; Milan, Italy
- Died: 31 December 1878 (aged 71); Milan, Italy
- Occupation: Writer

Giulietta Pezzi (10 February 1810 – 31 December 1878) was an Italian writer and journalist whose work included poetry, four novels, and a five-act play. (Note: Mori (2015) gives Pezzi's exact date of birth as 10 February 1810. Some older sources, e.g. Galletto (2001) and Grandi (1976), have given her year of birth as 1812 and 1816 respectively.) Born and educated in Milan, she was a devoted follower of Mazzini and active in the Italian republican and unification movements. In her later years she wrote for several newspapers and dedicated herself to the establishment of free public schools in Italy based on Mazzini's educational philosophy. She died in the city of her birth at the age of 71. During her lifetime several art songs were dedicated to her, including Bellini's "Vaga luna, che inargenti".

== Life and career ==
Giulia Giuseppina (Giulietta) Pezzi was born in Milan to Giuseppa Quon and Francesco Pezzi, a prominent journalist and theatre critic of Venetian origin and founder of the Gazzetta di Milano. She grew up in a culturally vibrant but unconventional family. Although Francesco Pezzi recognized Giulietta as his legal daughter, at the time of her birth he was married to Chiara Dorigo, by whom he had a son, Giovanni Giacomo Pezzi (1805–1869). When she was 15 she began contributing short stories and verses to her father's paper and continued to collaborate with her brother when he took over the Gazzetta di Milano on their father's death in 1831. She also formed early friendships with Domenico Ronconi and Vincenzo Bellini, both of whom dedicated art songs to her.

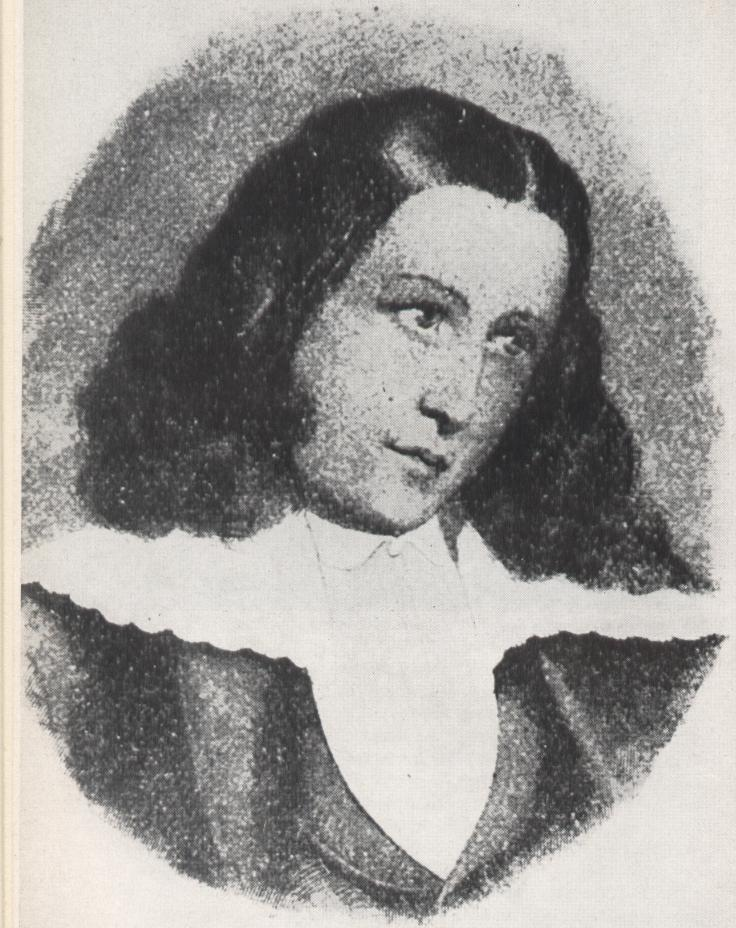
Pezzi's lover, Hermann Cohen (depicted age 15)

From the 1830s Giulietta and her brother were active in the Milanese salon of Clara Maffei where she came into contact with many artistic and literary figures of the day whom she charmed with her vivacious personality, beauty, and long blond curls. Honoré de Balzac, who frequented the Maffei salon in the late 1830s referred to her as "The Angel". In 1841, three of her poems were published in the Turinese journal Museo scientifico, letterario ed artistico. The following year, she published her first novel and gave birth to her daughter and only child, Noemi. According to Raffaello Barbiera, the child's father was Hermann Cohen, an eccentric German-Jewish pianist ten years her junior who later converted to Catholicism and became a priest of the Discalced Carmelite Order. Many members of the Maffei salon were active in the Risorgimento. It was there that Pezzi formed lifelong friendships with the Italian revolutionaries and patriots Aurelio Saffi, Maurizio Quadrio, Carlo Cattaneo, and above all, Giuseppe Mazzini, of whom she became a fervent follower.

After the failure of the 1848–1849 revolts and the Roman Republic, Mazzini fled to Switzerland. Pezzi remained in Milan where she clandestinely published Mazzini's writings and hosted the rendezvous of his co-revolutionaries, several of whom were later imprisoned or executed. When cautioned by friends that she was running a severe risk, she replied, "If I hear the police coming up the stairs, I will throw myself and my child from the window." Clara Maffei and her lover Carlo Tenca continued to support an independent Italy but wanted it to be a monarchy under the House of Savoy. Pezzi, along with Saffi, Cattaneo, and Mazzini, were all ardent republicans and eventually distanced themselves from the Maffei salon. With the unification of Italy in 1865, Pezzi wrote for several newspapers inspired by Mazzini's philosophy—Dovere, La Plebe, L'Unità Italiana—and for La Roma del Popolo, founded by Mazzini himself. In her article, "Dell'educazione della donna e della sua attitudine", published on 30 November 1871 in La Roma del Popolo, Pezzi delineated her thoughts on the importance of education and the role of women in society (with a strong criticism of Catholic moralism). After Mazzini's death in 1872, she dedicated herself to the establishment of free public schools in Italy based on his educational philosophy.

== Death and legacy ==
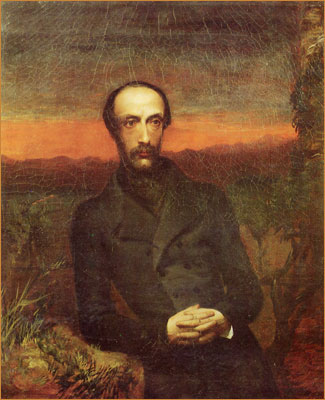
Giuseppe Mazzini in 1846. Pezzi dedicated her play Carlo Sand to him two years later.

Giulietta Pezzi died at her home in Milan in 1878 at the age of 71. Her tomb in the Cimitero Monumentale di Milano is adorned with a marble portrait by Giovanni Spertini and an epitaph written by her daughter Noemi. In 1880 Noemi supervised the posthumous publication of Pezzi's last novel Il nido delle rondini (The Swallows' Nest). An account of a group of Italian political exiles in Switzerland, the novel was based on Pezzi's experiences at the villa in Lugano where she often visited Mazzini during his exile. Her personal papers, which included extensive correspondence with Mazzini and Cattaneo, an album with messages from Alessandro Manzoni and Honoré de Balzac, a letter from Giuseppe Garibaldi, and portraits of George Sand and Giuseppe Verdi, were held in the Museo del Risorgimento di Milano from 1928. However, they were completely destroyed when the museum caught fire during the Allied bombing of Milan in 1943. A public nursery school and street in Milan are named in her honour.

== Works by Giulietta Pezzi ==
- "La pellegrina", "Foglia d'autunno", and "I fiori", three poems published in Museo scientifico, letterario ed artistico (1841)
- Gli Artisti: Sentimenti e impressioni, epistolary novel (1842)
- Egberto, novel (1843)
- Une fleur d'Israel, novel written in French under the name Juliette Pezzi (1847)
- Carlo Sand, five-act play dedicated to Mazzini (1848)
- Il nido delle rondini, novel published posthumously (1880)

== Works dedicated to Giulietta Pezzi ==
- "Arietta veneziana", music and text by Domenico Ronconi (1833)
- "Vaga luna, che inargenti", music by Vincenzo Bellini to an anonymous text (1833)
- "Romanza dedicata a madamigella Giulietta Pezzi da Ferdinando Facchini", music by Angelo Savinelli, text by Metastasio (1836) (Note: Angelo Savinelli (1800-1870) was a composer, virtuoso oboist, and singing teacher. Ferdinando Facchini was a basso cantante singer from Mantua, prominent in the 1830s and 1840s.)
- "Il cielo", music by Elisabetta Beltrami Barozzi, text by Giacomo Sacchèro (1844) (Note: Elisabetta Beltrami Barozzi (1818–190?) was a singer, composer, and ardent patriot active in the 1848/49 revolts against Austrian rule in Northern Italy. Giacomo Sacchero (1813–1875) was a librettist, scientist, and politician whose works included the libretto for Donizetti's opera Caterina Cornaro.)
