= Monte Pezza =

Monte Pezza may refer to:

- Monte Pezza (Belluno)
- Monte Pezza (Bologna)

== See also ==
- Pezza (disambiguation)
