= Vincenzo Bellini =

Italian opera composer (1801–1835)

- Born: 3 November 1801; Catania, Kingdom of Sicily
- Died: 23 September 1835 (aged 33); Puteaux, France
- Occupation: Opera composer

Vincenzo Salvatore Carmelo Francesco Bellini (Note: /bəˈliːni/ bə-LEE-nee; Italian: [vinˈtʃɛntso salvaˈtoːre karˈmɛːlo franˈtʃesko belˈliːni]) (3 November 1801 – 23 September 1835) was an Italian opera composer of the early Romantic era famed for his long, graceful melodies and evocative musical settings. A central figure of the bel canto era, he was admired not only by the public but also by many composers who were influenced by his work. His songs balanced florid embellishment with a deceptively simple approach to lyric setting.

Born to a musical family in Sicily, he distinguished himself early and earned a scholarship to study under several noted musicians at Naples' Real Collegio di Musica. There he absorbed elements of the Neapolitan School's style and was inspired by performances of Donizetti's and Rossini's operas, among others, in more modern idioms. He wrote his first opera, Adelson e Salvini (1825), for the conservatory, and his next, Bianca e Fernando (1826), on a Teatro di San Carlo-affiliated commission for promising students. He also became close friends with his peer and first biographer, Francesco Florimo.

Bellini then went to Milan to compose for La Scala, where the success of Il pirata (1827) established his short but significant career. He wrote many celebrated operas, ascending to triumphal heights with I Capuleti e i Montecchi (1830, La Fenice), La sonnambula (1831, Teatro Carcano), and more gradually Norma (1831, La Scala). He travelled abroad and wrote I puritani after a visit to London. Its successful premiere (1835, Théâtre-Italien) capped an illustrious international career. Bellini died at the age of 33 in Puteaux, France.

Verdi praised Bellini's expansive melodies as unequaled, while Wagner, who was rarely complimentary, was captivated by Bellini's expressive integration of music and text. Liszt and Chopin were also admirers, though Berlioz was less enthusiastic. Most musicologists now assess Bellini positively, though some question the quality of his work. Many of his operas, including Pirata, Capuleti, Sonnambula, Norma, and Puritani are regularly performed at major opera houses throughout the world.

== Catania: early life ==
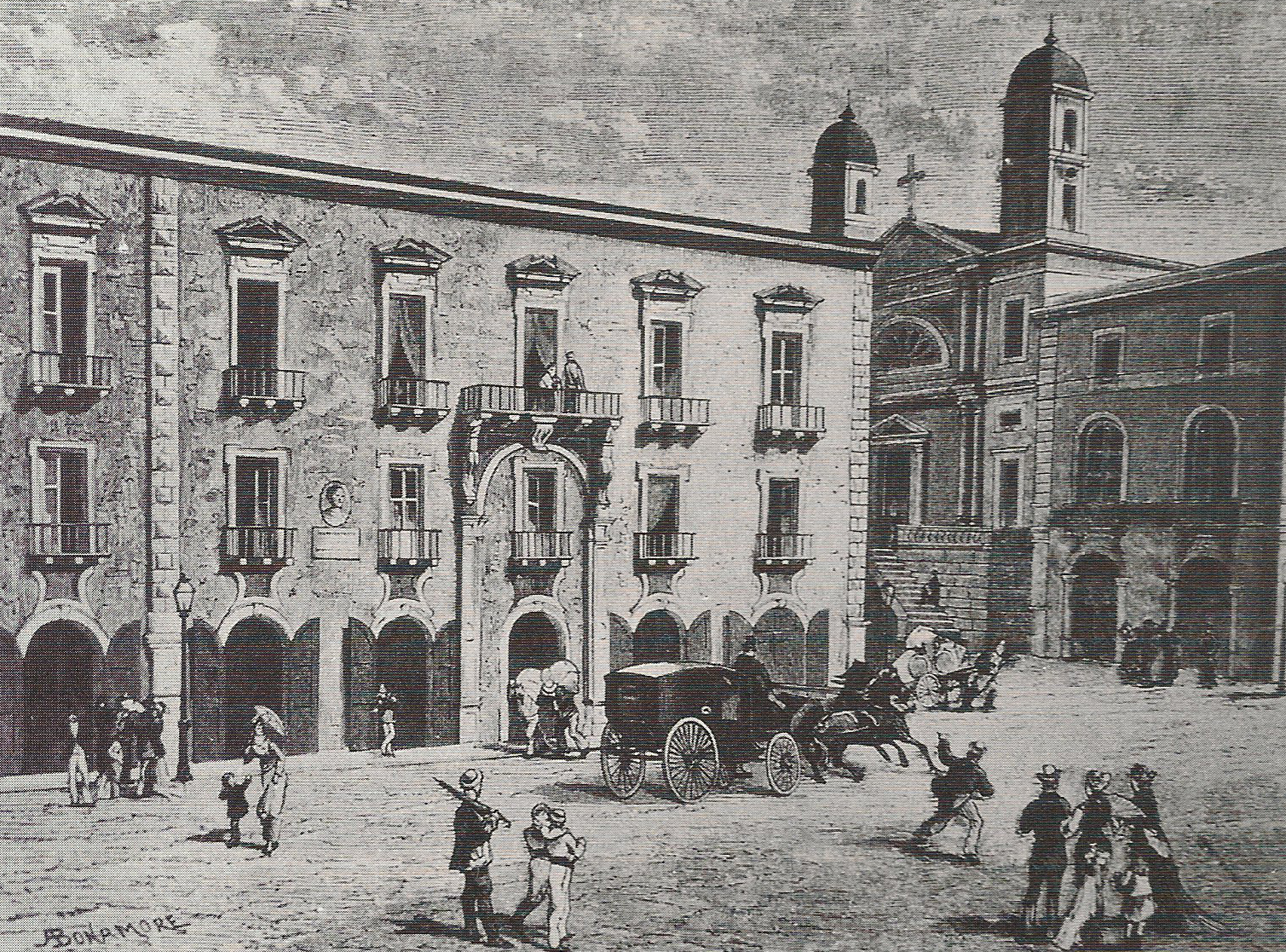
Bellini's birthplace, the Palazzo Gravina-Cruyllas, Catania, circa 1800

Born in Catania, the eldest of seven children in the family, he became a child prodigy within a highly musical family. His grandfather, Vincenzo Tobia Nicola Bellini, had studied at the conservatory in Naples and, in Catania from 1767 forward, had been an organist and teacher, as had Vincenzo's father, Rosario.

An anonymous twelve-page hand-written history, held in Catania's Museo Civico Belliniano, states that he could sing an aria by Valentino Fioravanti at eighteen months, that he began studying music theory at two years of age and the piano at three. By the age of five, he could apparently play "marvelously". The document states that Bellini's first five pieces were composed when he was just six years old and "at seven he was taught Latin, modern languages, rhetoric, and philosophy". Bellini's biographer Herbert Weinstock regards some of these accounts as no more than myths, not being supported from other, more reliable sources. Additionally, he makes the point in regard to Bellini's apparent knowledge of languages and philosophy: "Bellini never became a well-educated man".

Another biographer, Stelios Galatopoulos, discusses the information presented in the précis and accepts some of the evidence for early compositions but expresses scepticism regarding the young Bellini's child prodigy status. He mentions that Bellini never became a "proficient" piano player and, when he later went to the music conservatory in Naples at an age well past that required for admission and took an examination in which his compositions were assessed, he was placed in the beginners' class.

After 1816, Bellini began living with his grandfather, from whom he received his first music lessons. Soon after, the young composer began to write compositions. Among them were the nine Versetti da cantarsi il Venerdi Santo, eight of which were based on texts by Metastasio.

By 1818, Bellini had independently completed several additional orchestral pieces and at least two settings of the Mass Ordinary: one in D Major, the other in G Major, both of which survive and have been commercially recorded.

He was ready for further study. For well-off students, this would include moving to Naples. While his family wasn't wealthy enough to support that lifestyle, Bellini's growing reputation could not be overlooked. His break came when Stefano Notabartolo, the duca di San Martino e Montalbo and his duchess, became the new intendente of the province of Catania. They encouraged the young man to petition the city fathers for a stipend to support his musical studies. This was successfully achieved in May 1819 with unanimous agreement for a four-year pension to allow him to study at the Real Collegio di Musica di San Sebastiano in Naples. Thus, he left Catania in July carrying letters of introduction to several powerful individuals, including Giovanni Carafa who was the intendente of the Real Collegio as well as being in charge of the city's royal theatres. The young Bellini was to live in Naples for the following eight years.

== Naples: musical education ==
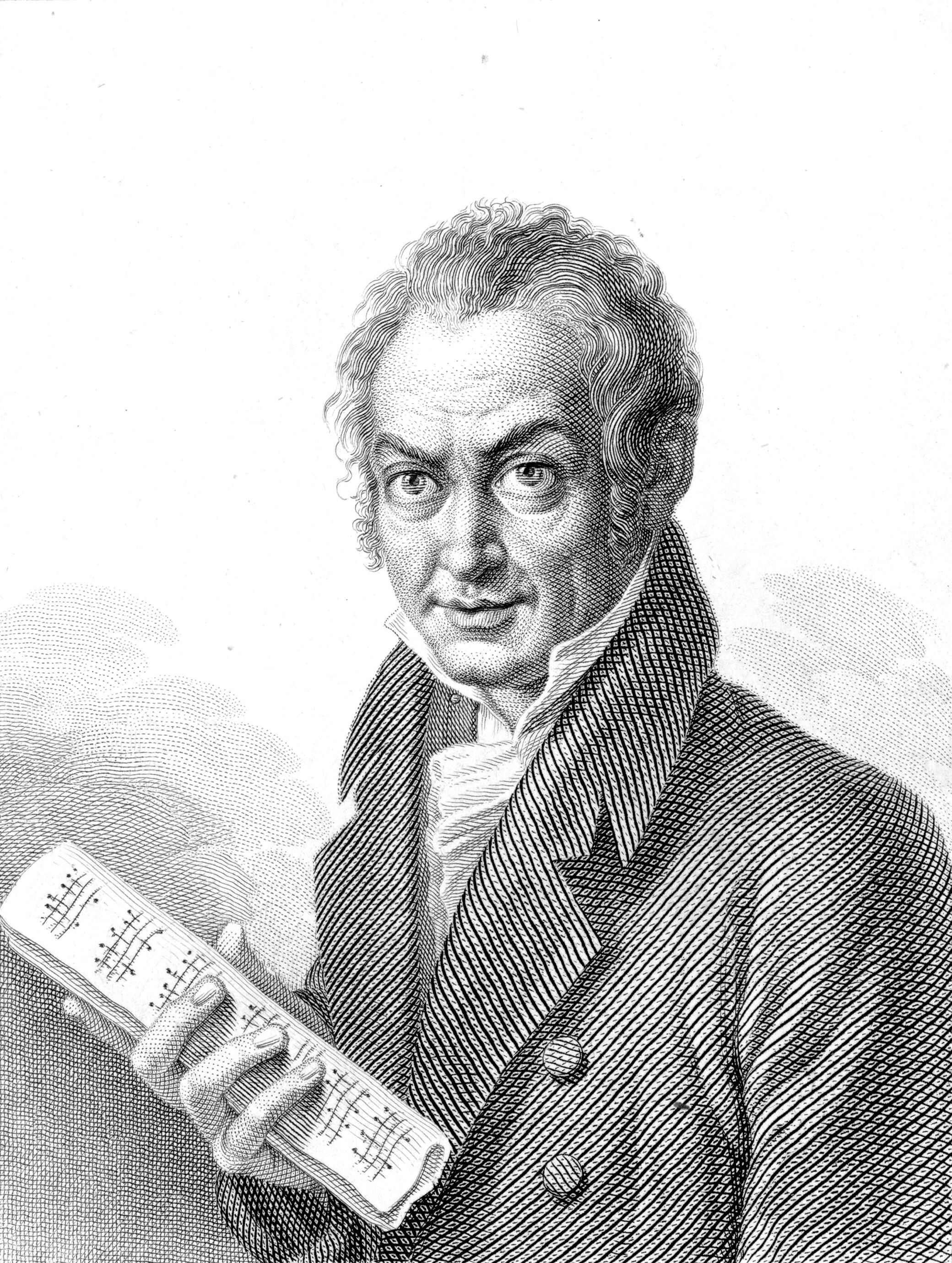
Composer Niccolò Antonio Zingarelli

The Conservatorio di San Sebastiano (as it had been named when the original Real Collegio di Musica, established in 1806 and then renamed as such in 1808) had moved to more spacious facilities close to the church of Gesù Novo and the building formerly occupied by the nuns of San Sabastiano, was run by the government and there, students, who wore a semi-military uniform, were obliged to live under a tight daily regimen of classes in principal subjects, in singing and instrumental coaching, plus basic education. Their days were long, going from early morning mass at 5:15 am to finally ending by 10 pm. Although beyond the normal age for admission, Bellini had submitted ten pieces of music for consideration; these clearly demonstrated his talent, although he did need to do remedial work to correct some of his faulty technique.

The focus of study was on the masters of the Neapolitan school and the orchestral works of Haydn and Mozart, with the emphasis put upon the Italian classical era composers such as Pergolesi and Paisiello, rather than the "modern-day" approaches of composers such as Rossini. The young student's first teacher was Giovanni Furno, with whom "he studied exercises in harmony and accompaniment"; another, from whom he learned counterpoint, was the composer of over 50 operas, Giacomo Tritto, but whom he found to be "old fashioned and doctrinaire". However, the artistic director of the school was the opera composer, Niccolò Antonio Zingarelli.

By 1822/23, Bellini had become a member of a class which he taught: the older man appears to have recognised Bellini's potential and treated his student like a son, giving him some firm advice:

If your compositions "sing", your music will most certainly please. ... Therefore, if you train your heart to give you melody and then you set it forth as simply as possible, your success will be assured. You will become a composer. Otherwise, you will end up being a good organist in some village.

It was during these early years at the Collegio that Bellini met Francesco Florimo, with whom he had a lifetime of correspondence. Other fellow students—who were to become opera composers—included Francesco Stabile and the Ricci brothers—Luigi and Federico—as well as Saverio Mercadante, who, by this time, was a graduate student.

Another person to whom the young student/composer was introduced was Gaetano Donizetti, whose ninth opera—which had been a great success in Rome—was given at the Teatro di San Carlo. About 50 years later, Florimo gave an account of the meeting of the two men: "Carlo Conti [one of Bellini's tutors] said to Bellini and me, "Go and hear Donizetti's La zingara, for which my admiration increases at every performance." After hearing the opera, Bellini acquired the score, convinced Conti to introduce him, and [Florimo] reports that Bellini's reaction was that he was "a truly beautiful, big man, and his noble countenance—sweet, but at the same time majestic—arouses affection as well as respect."

=== First Naples compositions ===
Increasingly, Bellini did better and better in his studies: in January 1820 he passed his examinations in theory, and was successful enough to gain an annual scholarship, which meant that his stipend from Catania could be used to help his family. In the following January he was equally successful and, to fulfill his obligations to write music for Catania – a condition of his scholarship – he sent a Messa di Gloria in A Minor for soloists, choir and orchestra, which was performed the following October.

Besides this melodious work, his output from these study years in Naples included two other settings of the Mass: a full Ordinary in E Minor and a second full Ordinary in G Minor, both of which probably date from 1823. There are two settings of the Salve Regina (one in A Major for solo soprano and organ, the other in F Minor for choir and orchestra), but these are less accomplished and may date from the first year of study after leaving Catania, 1820. His brief two-movement Oboe Concerto in E-flat from circa 1823 also survives and has been recorded by no less than the Berlin Philharmonic.

Bellini's involvement in Zingarelli's class took place over the 1822/23 school year. By January 1824, after passing examinations in which he did well, he attained the title primo maestrino, requiring him to tutor younger students and allowing him a room of his own in the collegio and visits to the Teatro di San Carlo on Thursdays and Sundays, where he saw his first opera by Rossini, Semiramide. While Weinstock gives an account of how he was "clearly captivated by the music of Rossini [and] put Rossini on a pedestal", he relates that, returning from Semiramide Bellini was unusually quiet and then "suddenly exclaimed to his companions, 'Do you know what I think? After Semiramide, it's futile for us to try and achieve anything!'"

But a tougher challenge confronted the young composer: how to win the hand of young Maddalena Fumarolis, whom he had met as a guest in her home and to whom he had become a music tutor. As their affair became obvious to her parents, they were forbidden to see each other. Bellini was determined to obtain the parents' permission for them to marry, and some writers regard this as the propelling reason for his writing his first opera.

=== Adelson e Salvini ===
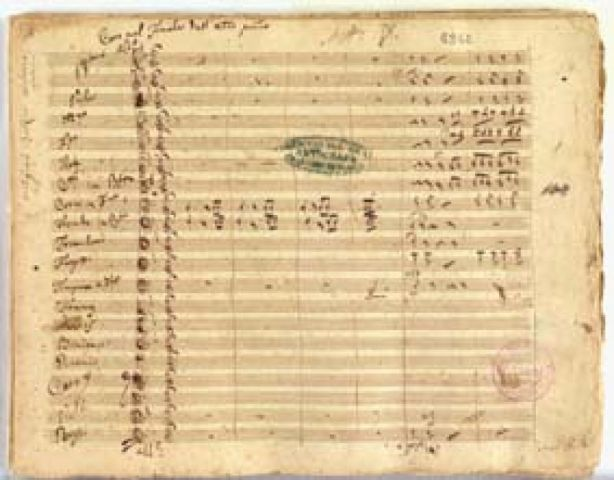
Adelson e Salvini: autograph of the score

The impetus to write this opera came about in late summer of 1824, when his primo maestrino status at the conservatory resulted in an assignment to compose an opera for presentation in the institute's teatrino. This became Adelson e Salvini, an opera semi-seria (half-serious) to a libretto by the Neapolitan Andrea Leone Tottola, who had written the one for Donizetti's La zingara. Adelson was first given sometime between mid-January and mid-March 1825, and featured an all-male cast of fellow students. It proved to be so popular among the student body that it was performed every Sunday for a year.

With that achievement behind him, it is believed that the young Bellini, who had been away from home for six years, set out for Catania to visit his family. However, some sources attribute the visit to 1824, others to 1825. However, it is known that he was back in Naples by the summer or early autumn of 1825 in order to fulfil a contract to write an opera for the San Carlo or one of the other royal theatres, the Teatro Fondo.

== Beginnings of a career ==
Following the presentation of Adelson e Salvini and while he was in Milan, Bellini—requesting help from Florimo—began to make some revisions, shortening the opera to two acts in the hope that it might be given stagings by Domenico Barbaja, the Intendant at the Teatro di San Carlo since 1809. But little is known about exactly how much Bellini or Florimo contributed to the revisions, and Weinstock asserts that no performances were ever given after 1825, but in March 1829, we find Bellini writing to Florimo that "I have written you the changes that you should make in Adelson ".

In the summer or early autumn of 1825, Bellini began work on what was to become his first professionally produced opera. A contract between the Conservatory and the royal theatres obliged the Conservatory—when it nominated a sufficiently talented student—to require that student to write a cantata or one-act opera to be presented on a gala evening in one of the theatres. After Zingarelli used his influence to secure this honour for his promising student, Bellini was able to obtain agreement that he could write a full-length opera and, furthermore, that the libretto did not have to be written by Tottola, the theatres' official dramatic poet. However, as Intendant of the San Carlo, "Barbaja was the chief beneficiary: 'With a small investment he found among those young men the one who would lead him to large profits'" notes Florimo.

=== Bianca e Gernando ===
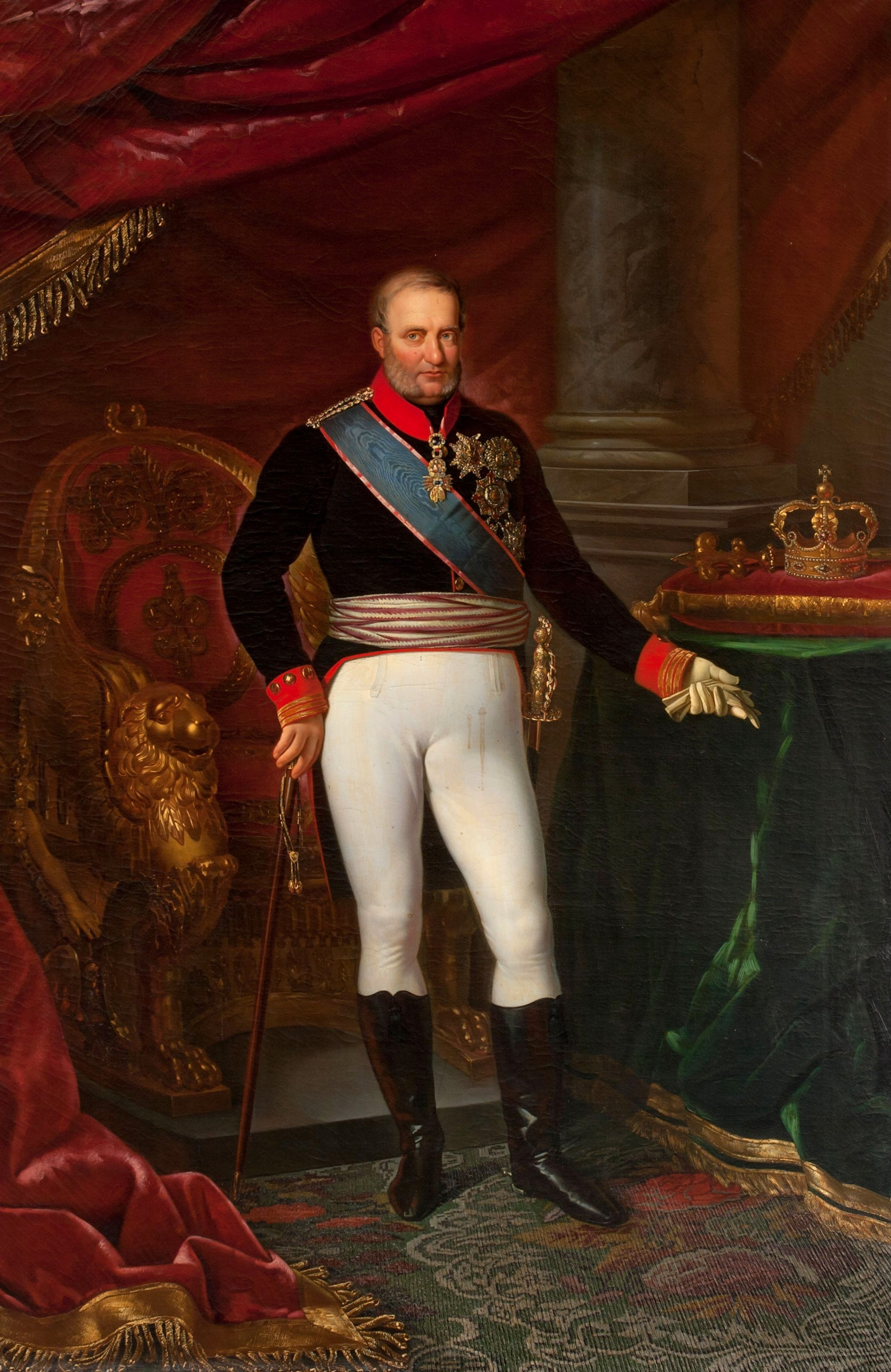
King Francesco I, who gave his personal approval to Bellini's Bianca e Gernando

The young composer chose Domenico Gilardoni, a young writer who then prepared his first libretto, which he named Bianca e Fernando, based on an 1820 play, Bianca e Fernando alla tomba di Carlo IV, Duca d'Agrigento and set in Sicily.

However, the title Bianca e Fernando had to be changed, because Ferdinando was the name of the heir to the throne, and no form of it could be used on a royal stage. After some delays caused by King Francesco I forcing postponement, the opera—now named Bianca e Gernando—was given its premiere performance at the Teatro di San Carlo on 30 May 1826, Prince Ferdinando's name day.

It was very successful, helped by the approval of the King, who broke the custom of there being no applause at a performance attended by royalty. It was also attended by Donizetti, who enthusiastically wrote to Simon Mayr: "It is beautiful, beautiful, beautiful, especially as it is his first opera." Bellini's music was highly regarded, with the Giornale delle Due Sicilie on 13 June noting that "[several of the arias and duets] are some of the most laudable pieces of new music heard in recent times at the [San Carlo]." However, there were reservations about Gilardoni's contribution.

Within nine months, in February/March 1827, Domenico Barbaja offered Bellini a commission for an opera to be presented in the autumn of 1827 at La Scala in Milan, of which between 1821 and 1832, Barbaja was also part of the management.

== Northern Italy ==
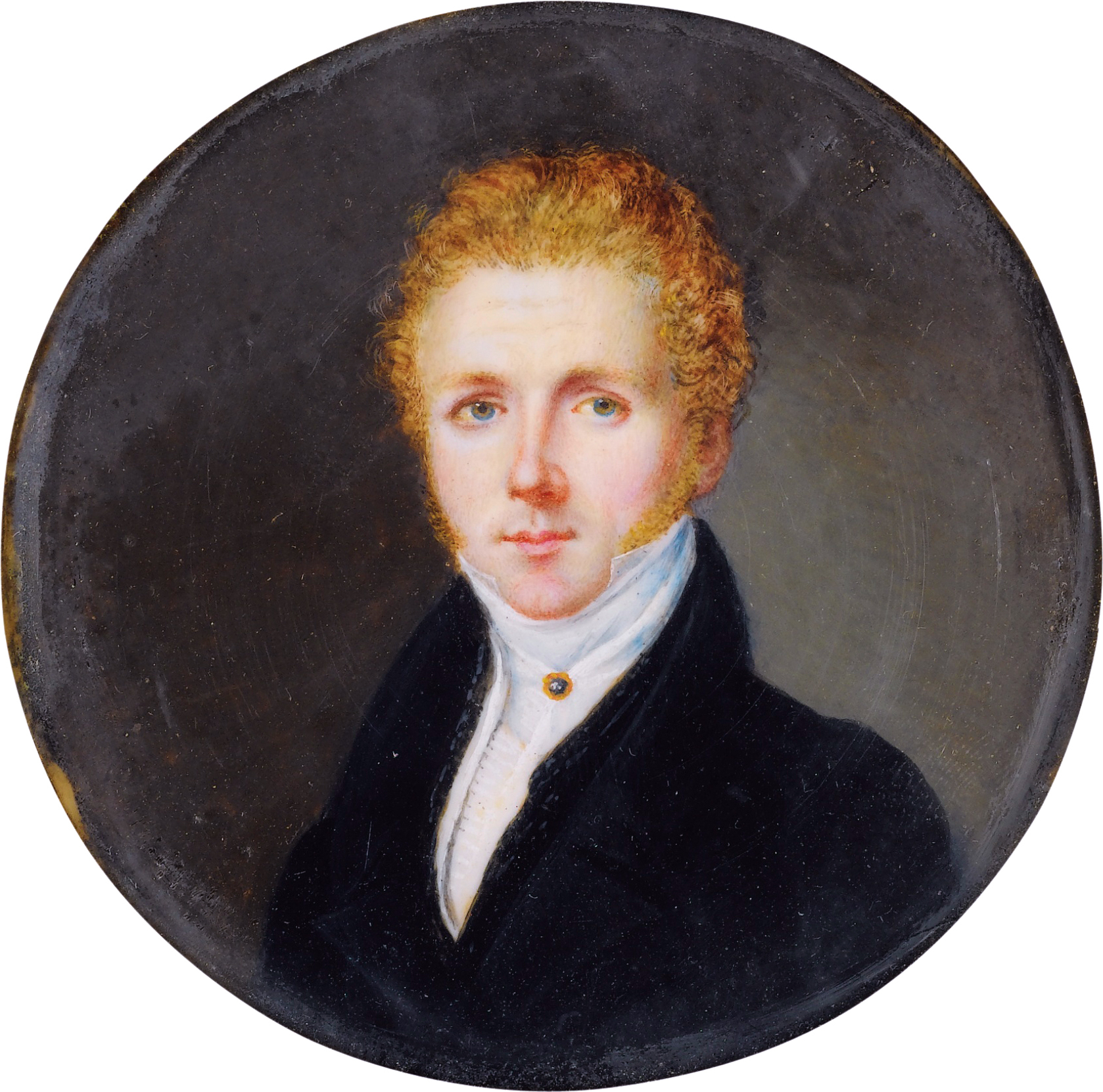
Bellini around 1830 (artist unknown)

Bellini spent 1827 to 1833 mostly in Milan, never holding any official position within an opera company and living solely from the income produced from his compositions, for which he was able to ask higher than usual fees.

Upon his arrival, he met Antonio Villa of La Scala and composer Saverio Mercadante, whose new opera, Il Montanaro was in rehearsal. The latter introduced him to Francesco and Marianna Pollini (an older couple, the husband a retired professor of piano, the wife a better-than-amateur musician), who immediately took the young man under their wing.

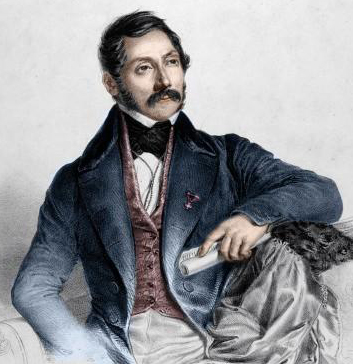
Librettist Felice Romani

In addition, Bellini was introduced to the librettist Felice Romani, who proposed the subject of the composer's first project, Il pirata, to which the young man willingly agreed especially when he realised that the story "provided several passionate and dramatic situations.. [and]..that such Romantic characters were then an innovation on the operatic stage." A strong professional relationship with Romani began from that time; he became Bellini's primary creative partner, providing the libretti for six of Bellini's operas which followed, in addition to about 100 libretti written for the major composers of the day, up to and including Verdi. As has been observed, "no other Italian opera composer of the time showed such an attachment to a single librettist" and although Romani was known to treat composers poorly, he evidently had great respect for Bellini, even acceding to his requests for revisions. For his part, Bellini admired "the sonorous and elegance of the poet's verses"

While in Milan, "[Bellini] quickly gained an entrée into higher social circles", although he also stayed for months at a time with friends, the Cantù and the Turina families. It was with Giuditta Turina that he began an affair in 1828 during the premiere performances of Bianca e Fernando in Genoa.

The four years in Northern Italy between 1827 and 1831 produced four great masterpieces, Il pirata, I Capuleti e i Montecchi, La sonnambula, and Norma, along with a revival and a setback.

=== Il pirata for Milan ===
The collaboration with Romani on Il pirata began in May 1827 and, by August, the music was being written. By then, the composer was aware that he was to write music for his favourite tenor Giovanni Battista Rubini and the soprano was to be Henriette Méric-Lalande. Both singers had starred in Bianca in the original 1826 production. The strong cast also included Antonio Tamburini, a major bass-baritone of the time. But rehearsals did not progress without some difficulties, as both Weinstock and Galatopoulos recount: it appears that Bellini found Rubini, while singing beautifully, to be lacking expressiveness: he was urged to "throw yourself with all your soul into the character you are representing" and to use [your] body, "to accompany your singing with gestures", as well as to act with [your] voice. It appears that Bellini's exhortations bore fruit, based on his own account of the audience's reactions to the first performance, as well as the reaction of the Gazzetta privilegiata di Milano of 2 December which noted that this opera "introduced us to Rubini's dual personality as a singer and actor". The reviewer continued to declare that this duality had never been expressed in other operas in which he had performed.

The premiere, given on 17 October 1827, was "an immediate and then an increasing, success. By Sunday, December 2, when the season ended, it had been sung to fifteen full houses". For Rubini, "it marked the defining performance for the tenor", and the newspaper reviews which followed all agreed with the composer's own assessment.

After its Milanese debut, the opera received very successful performances in Vienna in February 1828 and also in Naples three months later. Both productions starred Rubini, Tamburini, and—in the role of Imogene—Rubini's wife, Adelaide Comelli-Rubini, about whom Bellini had initial misgivings, although it appears that she acquitted herself very well. By this time, Bellini had begun to achieve international fame.

=== Bianca revised ===
After Il pirata, Bellini remained in Milan with the hope of securing another commission. One came from Genoa via Bartolomeo Merelli on 13 January 1828 for a new opera for presentation on 7 April. However, without knowing which singers would be engaged, he was unwilling to commit at that time, but remained in hope of something definite from La Scala for the autumn. When no alternatives appeared, he accepted Genoa's offer in February, but it was then too late to write anything new. He immediately proposed a revival and re-working of Bianca e Gernando, this time with the original title Bianca e Fernando, there being no royal by the name of Fernando in the House of Savoy. Romani wrote to Florimo in Naples and told him that he had taken on the re-construction of the libretto, with the result that "out of the whole of Bianca, the only pieces entirely unchanged are the big duet and the romanza; everything else is altered, and about half of it is new", Bellini then rearranged the music to suit the singers' voices, now knowing that the Bianca was to be Adelaide Tosi and the Fernando to be Giovanni David.

As Bellini reports, he had problems with Tosi wanting changes to be made to a cavatina and a stretta in one scene, but he stuck to his own opinion, proving to be correct when he reported the audience's reaction to Florimo: "the public was very happy with the entire opera, particularly with the second act". Overall, the first performance was even greater than it had been in Naples, and the opera was given a total of 21 times. However, critical reaction was not as positive as that of the audience: "The second act is a long bore" stated L'Eco di Milano, although the Gazzetta di Genova was more helpful, noting "the more we listen to the style of the music, the more we appreciate its merit".

=== After Bianca ===
Bellini remained in Genoa until 30 April and then returned to Milan, but with no specific opportunity in place. His initial opposition to Comelli-Rubini being allowed to reprise the role of Imogene in Il pirata for performances in Naples (as she had done in Vienna—but successfully) was proved to be wrong, since she did sing well there and received general approval. But this issue had caused complications in his relationship with Barbaja, who controlled both theatres, and when he visited Milan in June, he offered Bellini the opportunity to choose between Naples and Milan as the venue for his next opera. For the composer, the decision hung on the availability of singers for each of the houses, especially because Rubini was contracted to sing only in Naples. However, by 16 June, he had decided on the location to be Milan, and then signed a contract to write a new opera for the Carnival season for a fee of one thousand ducati, compared to 150 ducati for his first opera.

=== La straniera for Milan ===
For La straniera, Bellini received a fee which was sufficient for him to be able to make his living solely by composing music, and this new work became an even greater success than Il pirata had been. As for singers, it appears there was some doubt about the tenor, but that Henriette Méric-Lalande, Luigi Lablache (or Tamburini), would be available. In consultation with Romani as to the subject, it was agreed that it would be based on the novel L'étrangère (Il solitario) of 1825 by Charles-Victor Prévot, vicomte d'Arlincourt, and planned for the premiere on the opening night of the season on 26 December.

However, by 20 September, Bellini told Florimo that he did not think the performance could take place as scheduled due to Romani being ill. In addition, he was concerned about who would sing the tenor role when he had been unable to obtain Rubini's release from his Naples contract. Berardo Calvari (known as Winter) was rejected because audiences had disliked him the previous July when he appeared in both a Pacini and a Donizetti opera at La Scala. Fortunately, having received good reports of the young tenor Domenico Reina, he was able to secure his services, describing him in a letter to Florimo as "one who will want to do himself honour; everyone tells me that his voice is beautiful, and that he has all the acting and spirit one could wish for."

Following Romani's recovery, the delivery of the libretto arrived piecemeal, but Bellini set to work again; progress was slow. By 7 January 1829, with Romani having recovered and set off for Venice to fulfil a contract, the composer was "almost up to the 2nd act". Filippo Cicconetti, in his 1859 biography, gives an account of Bellini's working methods, explaining how he set texts to music, always with the words in front of him in order to see how inspired to compose he might become. When it came time to compose the final aria Or sei pago, ol ciel tremendo, the librettist's words gave him no inspiration at all and, at their next meeting, Romani agreed to rewrite the text. Returning within half an hour, the second version left Bellini equally cold—as did a third draft. Finally, when asked what it was that he was seeking, Bellini replied: "I want a thought that will be at one and the same time a prayer, an imprecation, a warning, a delirium ...". A fourth draft was quickly prepared: "Have I entered into your spirit?" asked the librettist—and he was embraced by the young composer.

Rehearsals began in early January with the premiere planned for 14 February 1829; it was an immediate and resounding success with the Gazzetta privilegiata di Milano on 16 February declaring it to be a:

clamorous success..[with] the poet [serving] the composer well, and the composer could not have served the singers better; all competed to render themselves pleasing to the public, and succeeded in such a way as to be applauded greatly.

Three days later, the same publication praised the quality of the music, describing Bellini as "a modern Orpheus" for the beauty of his melodies. Reporting to Romani, who was still in Venice, Bellini gave an account of the success: "the thing went as we never had imagined it. We were in seventh heaven. With [this letter] receive my gratitude more than ever ..." Others wrote equally enthusiastic reports, with abundant praise being given to the singers as well. However, there were detractors who criticised both the opera and its composer: its new style and its restless harmonic shifts into remote keys did not please all. 45 years later it was stated that "Bellini's style was abstruse, discontinuous, distorted, and lacking in distinction, that it alternated among the serio and the buffo and the semi-serio..."

=== Zaira: a setback in Parma ===
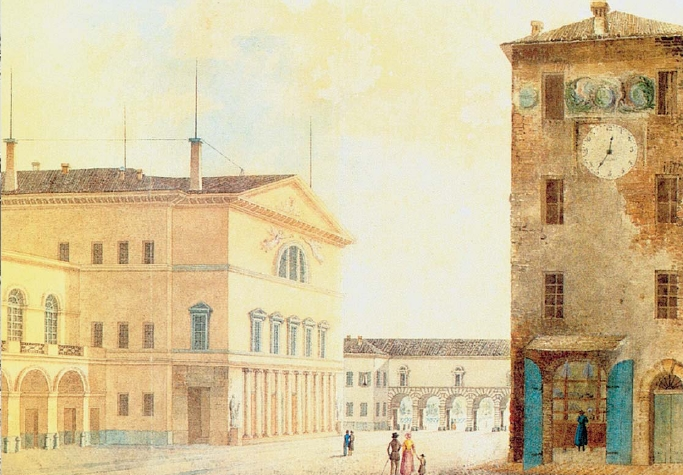
The Nuovo Teatro Ducale in 1829

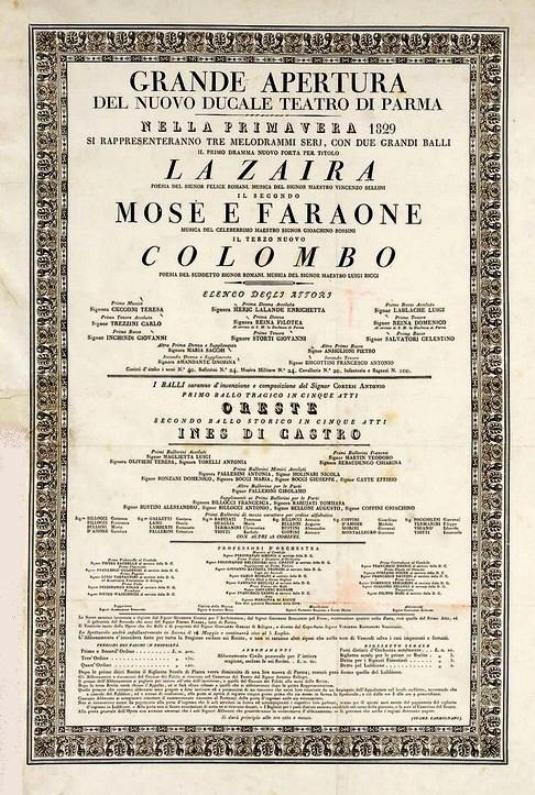
Poster for Nuovo's opening night

Zaira was the opera which came into being following discussions with Barbaja in Milan in June 1828 for a second opera for La Scala. At around the same time, Bellini reported to Florimo that he had been approached by Merelli about writing an inaugural opera for the soon-to-be completed Teatro Ducale (now the Teatro Regio) in Parma which was due to open during the following year on 12 May 1829. Initially, the opera was to be Carlo di Borgogna, but composer and librettist decided to tackle "a drama so ... hallowed as Voltaire's Zaïre", but this proved to be more challenging for Romani than first imagined.

With this opera, Bellini encountered "the first serious setback of a hitherto brilliant career". Several reasons have been put forward: Lippmann and McGuire note, it was because "Bellini showed too little enthusiasm for the undertaking". Another writer attributes it to Parma's traditional love of and favouritism towards the music of Rossini, while yet another notes that a combination of the composer being constantly seen in cafes around the city (when it was assumed that he should have been composing) and the fact that Romani had included a long explanation of the difficulties of adapting Voltaire in the printed libretto provided to all operagoers. The librettist was critical of his own work: "the style should have been more careful, and that here and there, certain repetitions of phrases and concepts should have been edited out". At the same time, he stated that, with music composed to those verses now in place, "I was not permitted to go back over what already had been done; and poetry and music were finished in less than a month". This short period of time compares to the months that, for example, it took Bellini to write Il pirata.

In fact, Bellini arrived in Parma on 17 March, giving him 56 days before the opening, but he then learned that some of the singers would only arrive 14 days before the date of the premiere, a date that was—in theory— unchangeable. In fact, it had to be changed due to the inability of Lalande to arrive in time for sufficient rehearsal. Both composer and librettist were somewhat dilatory, delaying work as much and as long as possible. Count Sanvitale's request on 17 April, asking "to let me know the reasons why our copyists are kept idle", did not receive much of response to satisfy the theatre's management. Eventually, both men got down to work and finished on time, although the premiere was delayed by four days.

The general impression given by reports in the press was that, overall, the music was weak, although some numbers and the trio were liked. However, for the most part, the singers were applauded, even if the composer received little. The opera received eight performances, followed by some poorly received ones in Florence in 1836, and then it disappeared until 1976.

== Major achievements ==
After the poor response in Parma to Zaira, Bellini stayed with Ferdinando and Giuditta Turina's family for a short period in May/June and then returned to Milan by the end of June and discovered that his grandfather, then 85, had died in Catania. No contract for another opera in sight, except for the possibility of working with the Teatro La Fenice in Venice. As is revealed by Herbert Weinstock, there is limited knowledge of what happened to Bellini between June 1833 and February 1834, since no letters to Florimo from that period have survived, and the only sources are those letters sent to others.

Giovanni Pacini, another Catanese composer, was still in Milan in late June after the well-received premiere on 10 June of his opera Il Talismano at La Scala, where it went on to receive a total of 16 performances. To Bellini, he appeared to be a rival, and with his recent success, Pacini received offers to compose an opera for both Turin and Venice for the Carnival season. He accepted both offers, but the La Fenice impresario included a proviso that if he were to be unable to fulfil the Venice contract, then it would be transferred to Bellini.

Bellini then became preoccupied with staging a revival of his Il pirata during the summer season at the Teatro Canobbiana because La Scala was closed for repairs. Il Pirata was staged with the original cast and again was a triumph: it received 24 consecutive performances between 16 July and 23 August 1829, thus outnumbering Pacini's.

During July and August, the composer Gioachino Rossini visited Milan on his way to Bologna. He saw the Il Pirata production and met Bellini; the two men were taken with each other, to the extent that when the younger composer was in Paris a year or two later, he developed a very strong bond with Rossini.

A firm offer of a contract for a new opera for Venice appeared in the autumn, a contract which also included a provision that Il pirata would be given during the Carnival 1830 season. Tearing himself away from dalliances with Mrs. Turina, by mid-December Bellini was in Venice where Giuseppe Persiani's Constantino in Arles was in rehearsal with the same singers who were to perform in Pirata: they were Giuditta Grisi, the tenor Lorenzo Bonfigli, and Giulio Pellegrini.

=== I Capuleti e i Montecchi: Venice, March 1830 ===
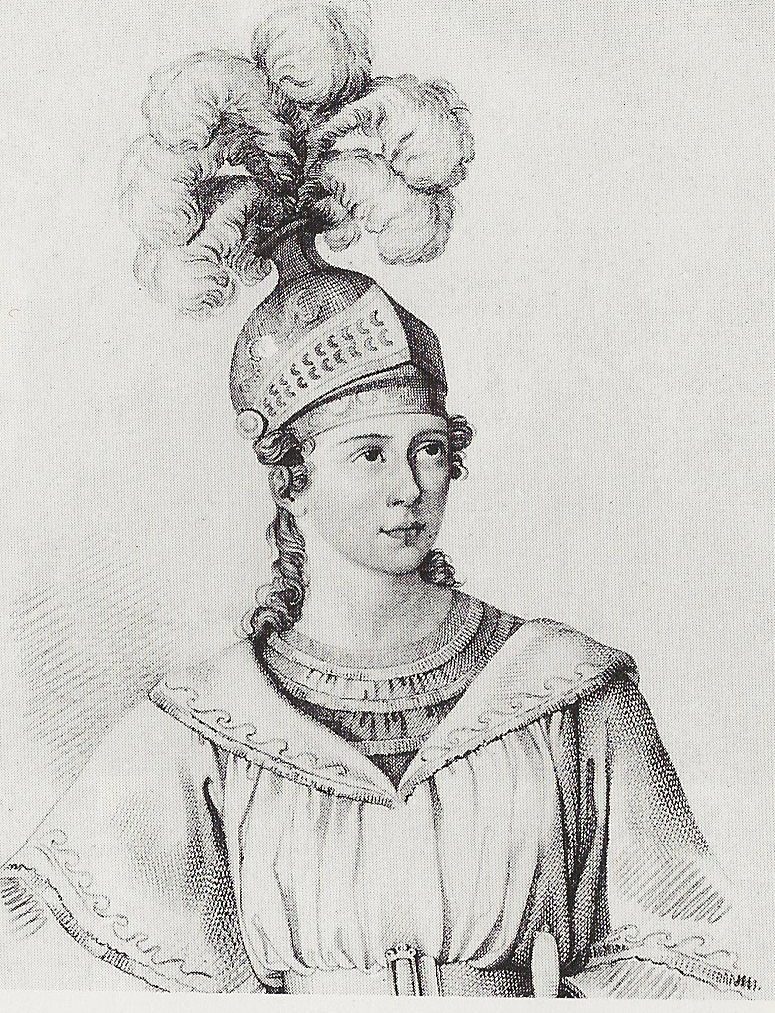
Maria Malibran as Romeo-Bologna, 1832

With rehearsals for Pirata underway in late December, Bellini was given notice by the La Fenice impresario, Alessandro Lanari, that it was doubtful whether Pacini would be present in time to stage an opera and that a contract was to be prepared with the proviso that it would only become effective on 14 January. Accepting the offer 5 January, Bellini stated that he would set Romani's libretto for Giulietta Capellio, that he required 45 days between receipt of the libretto and the first performance, and that he would accept 325 napoleoni d'oro (about 8,000 lire).

The tentative contract deadline was extended until 20 January, but by that date Romani was in Venice, having already re-worked much of his earlier libretto which he had written for Nicola Vaccai's 1825 opera, Giulietta e Romeo, the source for which was the play of the same name by Luigi Scevola which had been written in 1818. The two men set to work, but with the winter weather in Venice becoming increasingly bad, Bellini fell ill; however, he had to continue to work under great pressure within a now-limited timetable. Eventually, revisions to Romani's libretto were agreed to, a new title was given to the work, and Bellini reviewed his score of Zaira to see how some of the music could be set to the new text, but composing the part of Romeo for Grisi. He also took Giulietta's "Oh quante volte" and Nelly's romanza from Adelson e Salvini. The Giulietta was to be sung by Rosalbina Caradori-Allan.

At the premiere of I Capuleti e i Montecchi on 11 March 1830, success for Bellini returned. Weinstock describes the premiere as "an unclouded and immediate success" but it was only able to be performed eight times before the La Fenice season closed on 21 March. A local newspaper, I Teatri, reported that "all things considered, this opera by Bellini has aroused as much enthusiasm in Venice as La straniera aroused in Milan from the first evening on".

By this time, Bellini knew that he had achieved a degree of fame: writing on 28 March, he stated that "My style is now heard in the most important theatres in the world ... and with the greatest enthusiasm."

Before leaving Venice, Bellini was offered a contract to produce another new opera for La Fenice for the 1830–31 Carnival season, and—upon his return to Milan after a reunion with Turina—he also found an offer from Genoa for a new opera but proposed for the same time period, an offer he was forced to reject.

Later that year, Bellini prepared a version of Capuleti for La Scala, which was given on 26 December, lowering Giulietta's part for the mezzo-soprano Amalia Schütz Oldosi.

=== La sonnambula: Milan, March 1831 ===
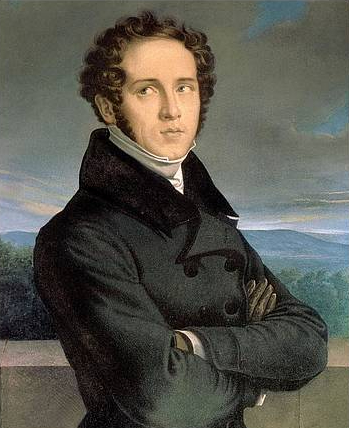
Portrait of Bellini by Jean-François Millet

Returning to Milan after the Capuleti performances, little occurred until the latter part of April when changes began to appear in the management of La Scala. The organisation, "Crivelli and Company", which had managed both that house as well as La Fenice, was negotiating with a triumvirate consisting of Count Pompeo Litta and two businessmen, their immediate concern being the engagement of singers and composers for La Scala. In order to contract with Bellini, he had to be released from his obligation to Venice; this was achieved by Litta buying out the Venice contract. When Bellini laid out his terms for writing for Milan, Litta gave him a very favourable response: "I shall earn almost twice as much as if I had composed for Crivelli [then the Venetian impresario]" he noted in a letter to his uncle.

However, the group led by Duke Litta failed to come to terms with the Crivelli-Lanari-Barbaja group, which continued to manage both La Scala and La Fenice. As a result, in the April–May 1830 period, Bellini was able to negotiate a contract with both the Litta group—which was planning performances in a smaller Milan house, the Teatro Carcano—and with the Crivelli group to obtain a contract for an opera for the autumn of 1831 and another for the 1832 Carnival season. These were to become Norma for La Scala and Beatrice di Tenda for La Fenice.

Bellini then experienced the re-occurrence of an illness which had emerged in Venice due to pressure of work and the bad weather, but which consistently recurred after each opera and which would eventually cause his death. The gastro-enteric condition—which he describes as "a tremendous inflammatory gastric bilious fever"— resulted in his being cared for by Francesco Pollini and his wife at their home because, as Bellini wrote, "he loves me more than a son".

Having recovered from his illness by the summer, Bellini went to stay near Lake Como. The need to decide on the subject for the following winter's opera became pressing, although it had already been agreed that Giuditta Pasta, who had achieved success in the Teatro Carcano in 1829 and 1830 with several major operas, would be the principal artist. That she owned a house near Como and would be staying there over the summer was the reason that Romani travelled to meet her and Bellini.

==== Attempts to create Ernani ====
By 15 July, they had decided on an adaptation of Victor Hugo's play, Hernani, although Weinstock speculates as to how this decision could have come about. The play's political subject matter would have been known to the group, and they would certainly know of the strict censorship then in existence in Austrian-controlled Lombardy. In addition, it was uncertain as to whether Pasta was interested in singing a trousers role, that of the protagonist, Ernani. While it seems that all three were in agreement, no further progress was made. Romani, who promised to begin the Ernani libretto immediately, went off to write one for what became Donizetti's Anna Bolena (which opened the Carcano's season in December 1830). Rather than resting, Bellini immediately set off for Bergamo to stage La straniera, then went back to the mountains. But, by the end of November, nothing had been achieved in the way of writing either the libretto or the score of Ernani.

On 3 January 1831, a letter from Bellini stated: "... I am no longer composing Ernani because the subject would have had to undergo some modifications at the hands of the police. ... [Romani] is now writing La sonnambula, ossia I Due Fidanzati Svizzeri. ... It must go on stage on 20 February at the latest."

==== La sonnambula replaces Ernani ====
Romani's libretto for La sonnambula was based on a ballet-pantomime by Eugène Scribe and Jean-Pierre Aumer called La somnambule, ou L'arrivée d'un nouveau seigneur. With its pastoral setting and story, La sonnambula was to become another triumphant success during Bellini's five years in Milan.

The title role of Amina (the sleepwalker) with its high tessitura is renowned for its difficulty, requiring a complete command of trills and florid technique. It was written for Pasta, who has been described as a soprano sfogato.

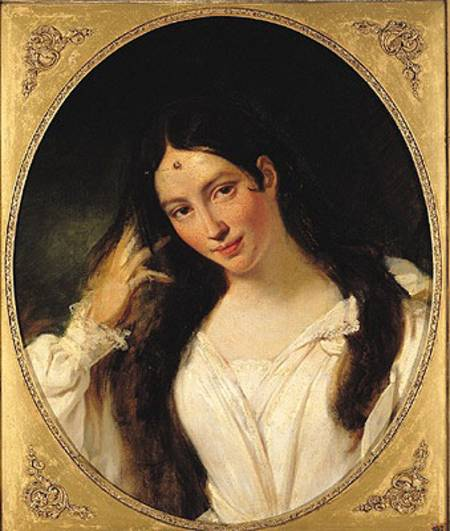
Soprano sfogato Maria Malibran sang Amina in 1834

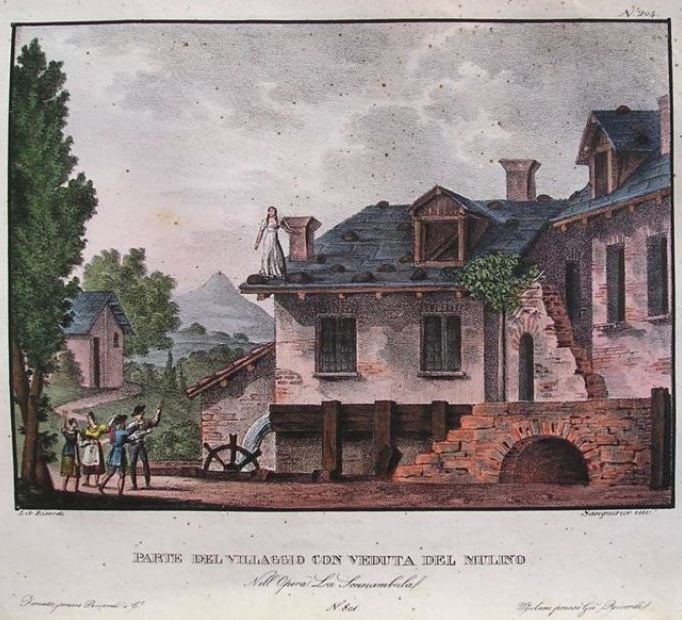
Alessandro Sanquirico's set design for the act. 2 sc. 2 sleepwalking scene for the premiere production

That music which he was beginning to use for Ernani was transferred to La Sonnambula is not in doubt, and as Weinstein comments, "he was as ready as most other composers of his era to reuse in a new situation musical passages created for a different, earlier one".

The opera's premiere performance took place on 6 March 1831, a little later than the original date, at the Teatro Carcano. Its success was partly due to the differences between Romani's earlier libretti and this one, as well as "the accumulation of operatic experience which both [Bellini] and Romani had brought to its creation." Press reactions were universally positive, as was that of the Russian composer, Mikhail Glinka, who attended and wrote overwhelmingly enthusiastically:

Pasta and Rubini sang with the most evident enthusiasm to support their favourite conductor [sic]; the second act the singers themselves wept and carried the audience along with them.

After its premiere, the opera was performed in London on 28 July 1831 at the King's Theatre and in New York on 13 November 1835 at the Park Theatre.

During Bellini's lifetime, mezzo/contralto Maria Malibran, a daughter of Manuel Garcia and renowned Rosina, made her own version of Amina and was a notable exponent of the role.

=== Norma: Milan, December 1831 ===
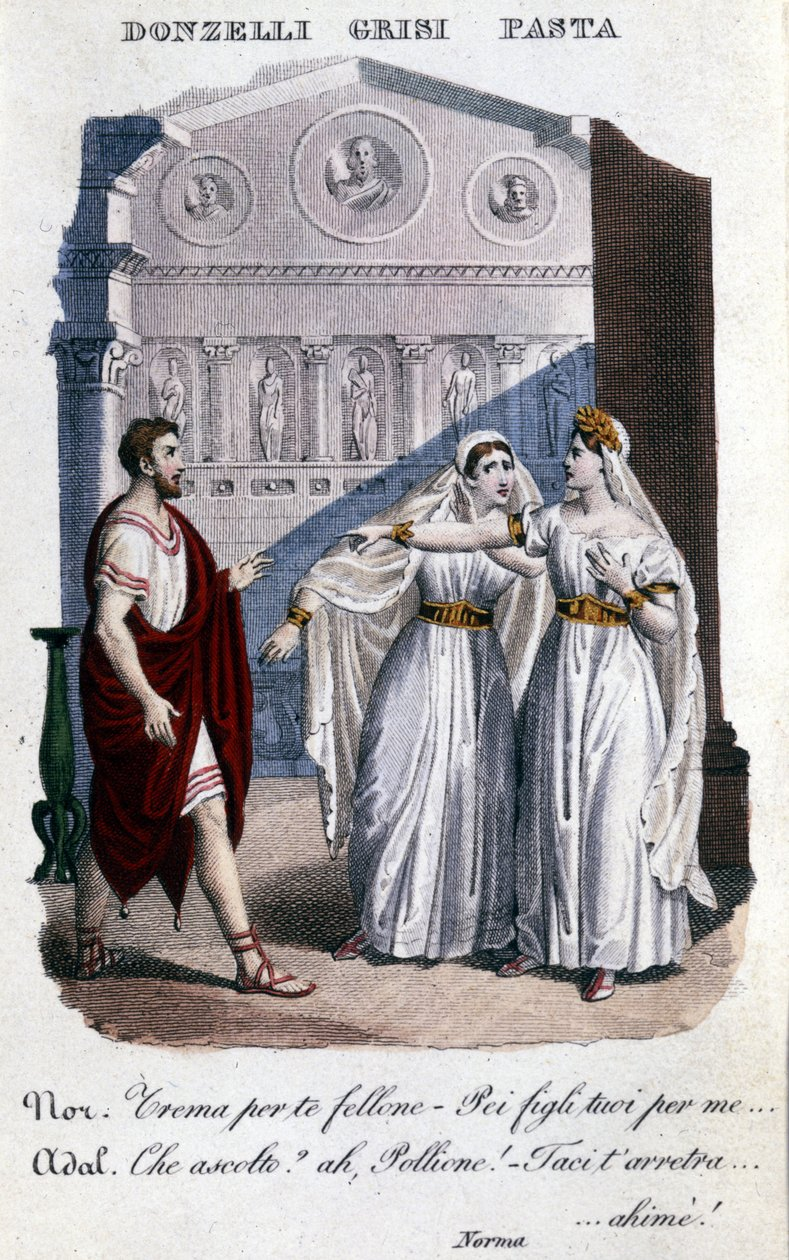
Norma: Donzelli, Grisi, and Pasta, the original cast

"Casta Diva" from Norma
Claudia Muzio, circa 1936

With La sonnambula successfully behind them, Bellini and Romani began to consider the subject of the opera for which they had been contracted by the Crivelli group for a December 1831 premiere at La Scala and which would mark Giuditta Pasta's debut at that house. By the summer, they had decided upon Norma, ossia L'Infanticidio which was based on the play of the same name, Norma, or The Infanticide by Alexandre Soumet which was being performed in Paris at around that time and which Pasta would have seen.

For the roles of Adalgisa and Pollione, La Scala had engaged Giulia Grisi, the sister of Giuditta, and the well-known tenor Domenico Donzelli, who had made a name for himself with Rossini roles, especially that of Otello. He provided Bellini with precise details of his vocal capabilities, which were confirmed by a report that Mercadante also provided. By the end of August, it appears that Romani had completed a considerable amount of the libretto, enough at least to allow Bellini to begin work, which he certainly did in the first weeks of September, as the verses were supplied. He reported in a letter to Pasta on 1 September:

I hope that you will find this subject to your liking. Romani believes it to be very effective, and precisely because of the all-inclusive character for you, which is that of Norma. He will manipulate the situations so that they will not resemble other subjects at all, and he will retouch, even change, the characters to produce more effect, if need be.

Pasta's vocal and dramatic ranges were extensive: that March, she had created the very different Bellini role of Amina, the Swiss village maiden, in La sonnambula.

As the year progressed, several things appeared which began to disturb the composer. Firstly, an outbreak of cholera had occurred in Austria in July, and concern about its spread to Italy was real, to the point that, by late September, Bellini was writing to Florimo: "I am composing the opera without any real zeal because I am almost certain that the cholera will arrive in time to close the theatres; but as soon it threatens to come near, I'll leave Milan."

About this time he had received an offer to compose for the Teatro di San Carlo in Naples and, in return, had imposed some harsh terms, totally objecting to the English soprano Marianna Lewis, "a donna who is below mediocrity: does not know how to sing, is a sausage on stage ..." He continues by stressing the need for a good tenor were he to come to Naples and, in a separate letter to be forwarded by Florimo, tells Principe di Ruffano, then the superintendent of the royal theatres, that he doubts that Barbaja would even agree to the fee already offered to him by La Scala, a total of 2,400 ducati, when he would want 3,000 ducati from Naples for all the additional expenses which he would incur. In a postscript, Bellini adds an indignant objection to what he has heard about the proposed casting of Capuleti in Naples. It is clear that he regards Barbaja as an enemy.

Norma was completed by about the end of November. Bellini then had to deal with the issue of piracy in regard to vocal reductions for piano of La sonnambula as published by Casa Ricordi. These scores were then fully orchestrated and sold to unsuspecting opera houses as full orchestral scores. This illegal action caused Bellini to publish a notice in major Italian newspapers putting such "pirates" on notice, but Weinstock comments that such attempts to control were not likely to succeed until Italian unification provided laws applicable to the country as a whole.

After rehearsals began on 5 December, Pasta baulked at singing the Casta diva in act 1, now one of the most famous arias of the nineteenth century. She felt that it was "ill adapted to her vocal abilities", but Bellini was able to persuade her to keep trying for a week, after which she adapted to it and confessed her earlier error. At the opening night, the opera was received with what Weinstock describes as "chill indifference". To Florimo on the night of the premiere, Bellini wrote "Fiasco! Fiasco! Solemn fiasco!" and proceed to tell him of the indifference of the audience and how it affected him.

In addition, in a letter to his uncle on 28 December, Bellini tries to explain the reasons for the reactions. As other commentators have also noted, some problems were innate to the structure and content of the opera, while others were external to it. Bellini discusses the tiredness of the singers (after rehearing the entire second on the day of the premiere) as well as noting how certain numbers failed to please—and failed to please the composer as well! But then he explains that most of the second act was very effective. It appears from the letter that the second evening's performance was more successful. Among the external reasons, Bellini cites the adverse reaction caused by the attitudes of both the owner of a journal (and his claque) and also of "a very rich woman"—who Weinstock identifies as Contessa Giulia Samoyloff— who was Pacini's mistress. He also notes that on this second evening, the theatre was full.

In all, Norma was given 39 performances in its first season at La Scala, and reports from elsewhere, especially those from Bergamo when performances were given there in late 1832, suggested that it was becoming more and more popular. Bellini left Milan for Naples, and then Sicily, on 5 January 1832, but for the first time since 1827, it was a year in which he did not write an opera.

=== Naples, Sicily, Bergamo: January to September 1832 ===
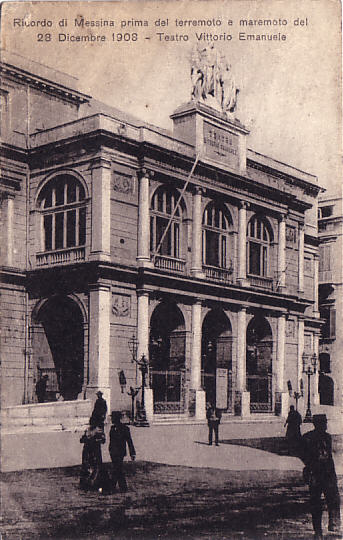
Teatro della Munizione, Messina (as known in the early 19th century)

Bellini travelled to Naples, although he may have stopped in Rome to see Giuditta Turina and her brother Gaetano Cantù. However, the sister and brother also went to Naples, where Giuditta was finally able to meet Florimo and see the city in which Bellini had triumphed. Within six days, Bellini was in Naples where he remained for six weeks.

During that time he remained busy, spending some time with Turina (who was ill for part of it), visiting the conservatory and meeting with many of the students and his old teacher, Zingarelli (to whom he had dedicated Norma), and attending a performance of Capuleti at the San Carlo with Turina and Florimo on 5 February in the presence of King Ferdinand II. The King led the applause for the composer, resulting in his being called to the stage and thus enjoying a very warm welcome from the people of Naples.

Planning to leave Naples by 25 February, he dealt with the invitation from Lanari at La Fenice to compose for that house by stating that he would not work for less than the sum received from the last production, and that he was also in discussions with the San Carlo. Arriving in Messina along with Florimo on the morning of 27 February, Bellini was greeted by several members of his family, including his father. They remained in Messina for two days, attending a performance of Il pirata at the Teatro della Munizione, where he was greeted with "loud shouts of pleasure, hand-clapping, and words of praise".

Bellini arrived in Catania on 3 March to a civic welcome. He was greeted by the city's authorities and citizens, who also feted him at a concert the following evening. This included excerpts from La sonnambula and Il pirata at the Teatro Communale, now replaced by the Teatro Massimo Bellini, which was opened in 1890 and named in Bellini's honour. After a month, Bellini and Florimo left for Palermo where, once again, there was a "royal welcome" and where he made the acquaintance of Filippo Santocanale and his wife. Although the weather delayed their departure for Naples, they continued to spend an enjoyable time there, but Bellini was anxious to return to Naples before Easter and to be with Giuditta Turina, who had remained in that city. They reached Naples on 25 April, where he was reunited with Turina.

Upon his arrival, Bellini wrote to his new friend Santocanale in Palermo, telling him that he would be accepting a contract from La Fenice so the issue had resurfaced in the form of a contract from Lanari which appeared to have accepted the composer's terms. But he had forgotten how much he had demanded: writing to Giuditta Pasta's husband, Giuseppe, he asked for the letter he had written to him (in which he had revealed the terms offered) to be sent to him to await his arrival in Florence.

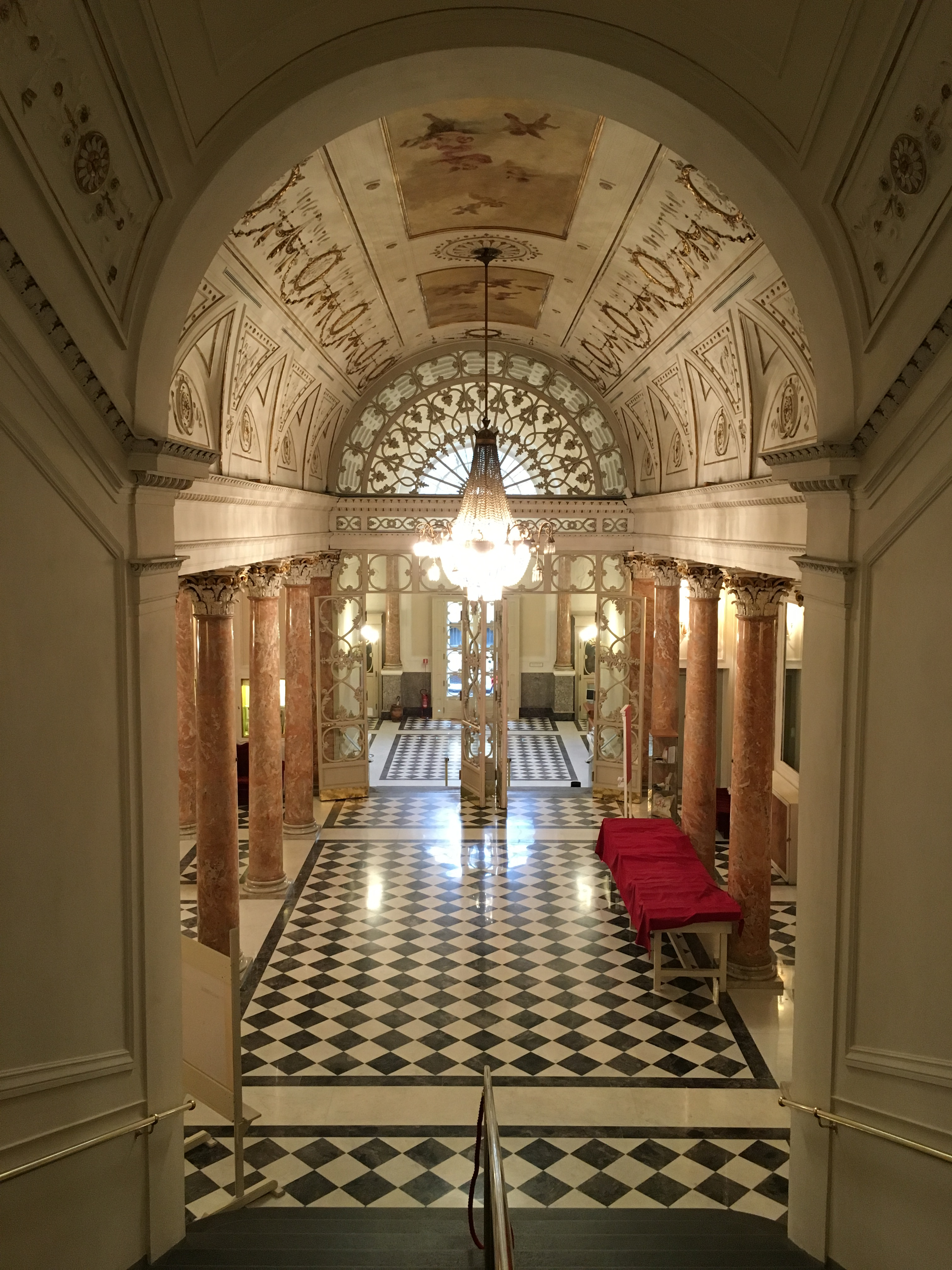
Foyer of the Teatro della Pergola, after redecoration in the 1850s

When returning to Naples, the couple reached Rome on 30 April. There is speculation that, when there, Bellini composed a one-act opera, Il fu ed il sarà (The Past and the Present) for a private performance (which was supposedly not given until 1832), but little further information—nor any of the music—has been forthcoming. It appears that the couple (along with Giuditta's brother) left for Florence on or around 20 May travelling by private coach and that he attended what he described as "a quite unrecognisable" performance of La sonnumbula at the Teatro della Pergola. In the same letter, Bellini informed his publisher that: "I have arranged the contract with Lanari to compose the opera for Venice; there I'll have the divine Pasta, and on the same terms as the contract with La Scala for Norma". He continues by stating that, in addition, he will receive one hundred per cent of the rental rights of the scores.

Within a few days, Bellini was in Milan, from there writing to his friend Santocanale in Palermo that "I'm ... trying to find a good subject for my new opera for Venice. In August, I shall go to Bergamo for the production of my Norma with Pasta." From Bergamo, he wrote to Romani, excited to tell him that:

Our Norma is decidedly a great success. If you heard how it's performed in Bergamo, you'd almost think that it was a new work ... [Pasta] even moves me. In fact, I wept [with] the emotions I felt in my soul. I wanted you near me so that I could have these emotions with you, my good advisor and collaborator, because you alone understand me. My glory is intrinsic to yours.

After the successful production in Bergamo, which was favourably reviewed by the same writer from the Gazzetta privilegiata di Milano who was not enthusiastic about the original Milan production, Bellini spent a few days with Turina, and then, by mid-September, had returned to Milan anxious to meet Romani to decide on the subject for the following February's opera for La Fenice for which a contract had become official. In addition, it had been agreed that the new opera would be preceded by performances of Norma and that they would open the season.

=== Beatrice di Tenda: Venice 1833 ===
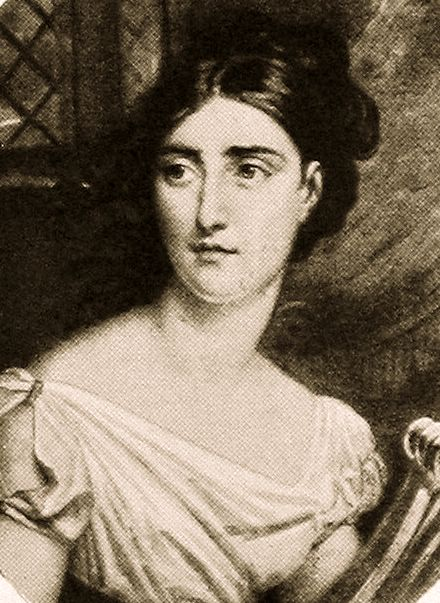
Giuditta Pasta sang Beatrice

Beatrice di Tenda, with the leading role requiring a strong female character to be written for Pasta, the composer and librettist met to consider a subject. Much of the initial work fell upon Romani, who had to look at a number of possible sources, and he became irritated by the task, finally hoping that a shipment of books from Paris would reveal a suitable one. It appears that by 6 October, a subject had been agreed upon: it would be Cristina regina di Svenzia from a play by Alexandre Dumas which had appeared in Paris in 1830. However, by one month later, Bellini was writing to Pasta to state that: "The subject has been changed, and we'll write Beatrice di Tenda [after the play of the same name by Carlo Tedaldi-Fores.] I had a hard time persuading Romani, but persuade him I did, and with good reasons. Knowing that the subject pleases you, as you told me the evening when you saw the ballet [in September 1832 in Milan when it accompanied a Mercadante opera] ... He is a man of good will, and I want him to show it also in wanting to prepare at least the first act for me swiftly."

Bellini's expectation that Romani's goodwill would be demonstrated promptly, turned out to be a mistake. The librettist had vastly over-committed himself: by the time that Cristina became Beatrice, he had made commitments to Mercadante for an October opera; also to Carlo Coccia for an opera for La Scala on 14 February 1833; and further, to Luigi Majocchi for a Parma production on 26 February; to Mercadante for La Scala on 10 March; and to Donizetti for Florence on 17 March. Nothing happened in November; Bellini announced that he would arrive in Venice in early December, and after the 10th, he became preoccupied with rehearsals for Norma. However, the lack of any verses—for an opera which was supposed to be staged in the second half of February—caused him to have to take action against Romani. This involved a complaint lodged with the governor of Venice who then contacted the governor of Milan, who then had his police contact Romani. The librettist finally arrived in Venice on 1 January 1833. He holed up to write Bellini's libretto, but, at the same time, Donizetti was equally incensed at delays in receiving a libretto from Romani for an opera which was to be Parisina.

When Norma opened on 26 December, it was a success but only because of Pasta. The Adalgisa of Anna Del Serre and the Pollione of Alberico Curioni were mediocre; Bellini feared for how Beatrice would turn out. Writing to Santocanale on 12 January, Bellini was in despair, complaining of the short time to write his opera because "Whose fault is that? that of my usual and original poet, the God of Sloth!" Their relationship quickly began to deteriorate: greetings including tu (the informal "you") gave way to voi (the formal "you") and they lived in different parts of Venice. However, by 14 February, Bellini was reporting that he had only "another three pieces of the opera to do" and that "I hope to go onstage here on 6 March if I am able to finish the opera and prepare it."

As it turned out, Bellini was only able to prepare the opera for rehearsals by deleting sections of the libretto as well as some of the music for the finale. To create more time for Bellini to finish, at La Fenice Lanari padded the programme with older works or revivals, but that allowed only eight days for Beatrice before the scheduled end of the season. Not surprisingly, the audience greeted the opening night on 16 March with little enthusiasm, especially after Romani's plea for "the reader's full indulgence" appeared in the libretto, but at the following two performances there was a large crowd. For Bellini, his opera "was not unworthy of her sisters".

=== The break with Romani ===
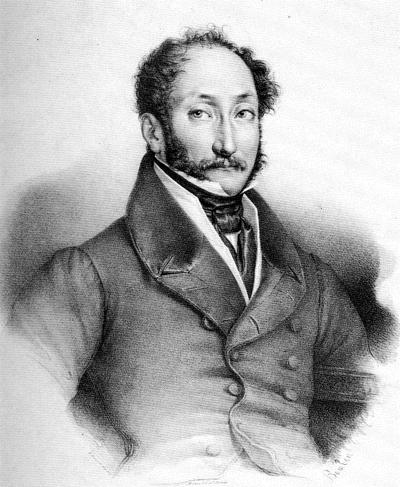
Librettist Felice Romani

There then began what Herbert Weinstock describes in over twelve pages of text, which include the long letters written by both sides in the dispute:

The journalistic storm over Beatrice di Tenda was about to evolve into the bitterest, most convoluted, and—at our distance from it—most amusing polemic in the annals of early nineteenth-century Italian opera.

Three days before the premiere, the Venetian daily, the Gazzetta privilegiata di Venezia, had published a letter purportedly written to its editor by 'A.B.' of Fonzaso, in Weinstein's view most certainly fabricated by Tommaso Locatelli, the musically sophisticated man who edited the paper. In the letter, he complained about the delay in the production of Beatrice as the end of the season became closer.

Weinstock assumes that it is Locatelli who replied to "A.B.", asserting that Bellini and Romani were trying to achieve perfection before taking the opera to London. Then a torrent of anti-Beatrice letters appeared after the first performance, followed by a pro-Bellini reply, signed "A friend of M. Bellini". This letter removes the blame from Bellini and lays it at the feet of Romani, outlining the timetable for the delivery of the libretto, which was contracted to be due in two parts: one in October and then the second in November. The author states that, except for a limited amount of text, nothing had been received by mid-January, and the piece continues by describing the legal proceedings taken by Bellini and the various setbacks which occurred even after Romani arrived in Venice. On 2 April, this provoked a response from Romani himself, presenting his case against Bellini based largely on the composer's inability to decide on a subject, as well as justifying all the work which he did after arriving in Venice, only to find his melodramma "touched up in a thousand ways", in order to make it acceptable to "the Milords of the Thames [who] await him", a sarcastic reference to planned trip to London. Another, a more "venomous" version of this letter, was sent to Milan's L'Eco.

"Pietro Marinetti" replied from the pro-Bellini camp in the Milan journal, Il Barbiere di Siviglia on 11 April. In "Two Words for Signor Felice Romani" [but which takes five pages in print], he states that it is not his intention to defend the composer but "only to vent my displeasure given me and all sensitive people by the very sarcastic manner, full of personal rancor and hauteur, with which Signor Romani has undertaken to assail his antagonist." Not unexpectedly, a further "cannonade" (says Weinstock) appeared from Romani, published this time in L'Eco on 12 April 1833 with both an editor's preface, decrying the poor taste displayed by both sides, and a brief final response from Marinetti.

==== The relationship begins to be repaired ====
Having been invited to write a new opera for the San Carlo for the 1834–35 Carnival season, but declined because of his Paris commitment, he stated that May 1835 might be possible when he knew who were to be the contracted singers. Florimo immediately began to try to persuade his friend, indicating that Malibran had been engaged for Naples in January 1835. Continuing his letter to Florimo, he states:

why the Management ... doesn't make a contract with Romani; not just for one libretto, but by the year ... with the understanding that he come to live in Naples; thus he could write the libretto for me as the only poet attached to the theatre, and if they want to negotiate with him, they can commission me to arrange it; I'd like to return good for evil to that wrongheaded and very talented man ...

From that statement of March 1834, it does not appear that animosity still existed on the composer's part. Through an intermediary, Bordesi (or Bordese), a mutual friend of both men, Romani initially expressed interest in re-establishing friendly relations with Bellini. Thus, Bellini wrote back to the intermediary, stating: "Tell my dear Romani that I still love him even though he is a cruel man", and he continues by wondering if Romani ever thinks about him, where he, Bellini, says, "whereas I do nothing but to talk about him to the entire universe". Then he ends with: "Give him a kiss for me". This was followed by a letter to Florimo in late May where Bellini wishes to know if Romani reciprocated his feelings, which—it appears—did happen when he writes to Romani himself (most likely expansion of the initial draft) laying out a series of concerns, but quoting back to him a part of his own letter to Bordese in which Romani states "I have not ceased to love him [Bellini], for I recognise that the blame is not all his".

In conclusion, Bellini suggests "draw[ing] a veil over everything that happened", stating that he cannot come to Milan at this time but, since he was planning to write the opera for Naples for 1836, he could do so in January [1835: presumably after I puritani]. He ends by saying that, if he does not hear back from Romani, he will not write to him again. Little is known about Romani's reply, but reply he did, as indicated in Bellini's letter to Florimo in October followed by a very friendly one on 7 October 1834 to the librettist (who had been engaged in Turin) and in which he states: "It seemed impossible to exist without you", closing with "Write for Turin or for wherever, write for me alone: only for me, for your Bellini".

Within a year of writing that letter, Bellini was dead. The two men never did meet again.

== London: April to August 1833 ==
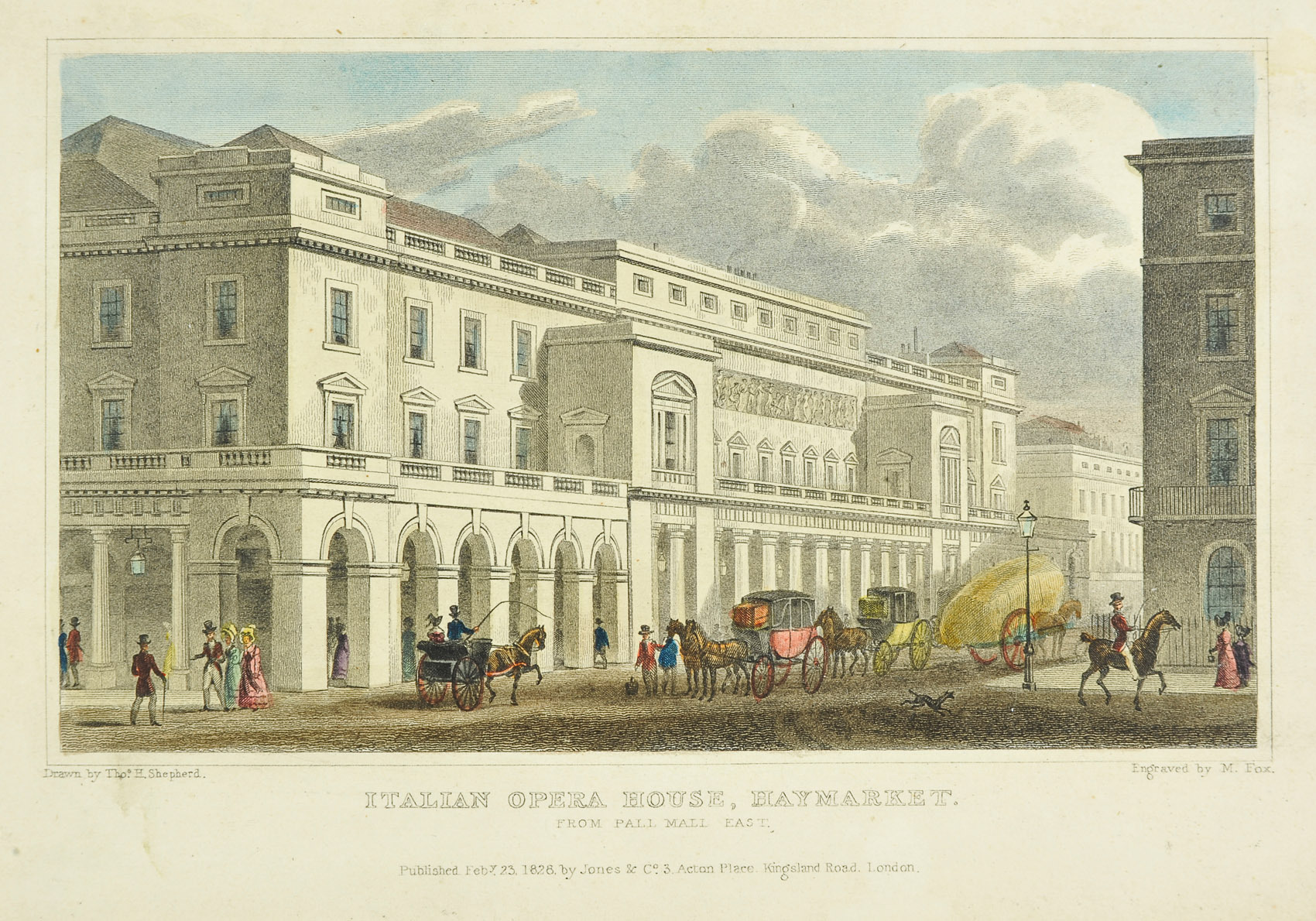
King's Theatre, London (aka Italian Opera House) by Thomas Hosmer Shepherd, 1827–28

After leaving Venice on 26 March, before the barrage of letter-writing began, it is known that Bellini spent some time with Mrs. Turina in Milan and, leaving many of his personal possessions with her, appears to have planned to return there by August since he did not give up his rooms in the contrade dei Tre Monasteri.

With the Pasta and other members of the Italian troupe contracted for London by the impresario of the King's Theatre, Pierre-François Laporte, Bellini and his troupe set off. On the journey, it is known that he stopped in Paris and discussed with Dr. Louis Véron, the director of the Paris Opéra, the possibility of writing a French opera, but his intention was to focus on that subject on his return in the coming July.

As Weinstock notes, when the Italians arrived in London by 27 April, Bellini was a known factor, many of his operas having already been given over the previous few years. His name is listed as an attendee in the Morning Chronicle of 29 April at a performance of Rossini's La Cenerentola, along with those of Maria Malibran, Felix Mendelssohn, Niccolò Paganini, as well as Pasta, Rubini, and other visiting Italian singers. His operas, which had been presented in London, included Il pirata (with Henriette Méric-Lalande in April 1830) followed by La sonnambula (with Pasta) and La straniera (with Giuditta Grisi).

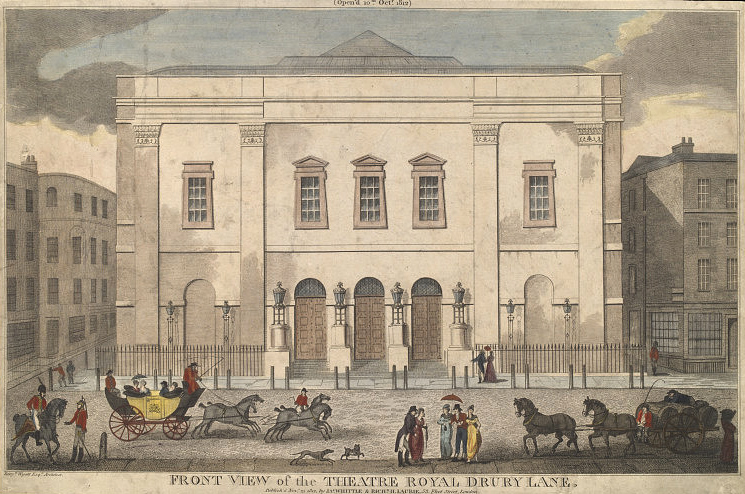
Theatre Royal, Drury Lane, 1812

In addition—and separate from Bellini's troupe at the King's Theatre—Maria Malibran was about to present her London debut in La sonnambula at the Theatre Royal, Drury Lane on 1 May in an English version with "an adapted Bellini score". It appears that Bellini had his first meeting with Malibran when attending a performance where, as he states:

my music was tortured, torn to shreds. ... Only when Malibran was singing did I recognise my [opera] ... but in the allegro of the final scene, and precisely at the words 'Ah! m'abbraccia' ... I was the first to shout at the top of my voice: 'Viva, viva, brava, brava,' and to clap my hands as much as I could. [When he was recognised by the audience, who became more and more enthusiastic, he was called to the stage where he embraced Malibran. He continues:] My emotion was at its climax. I thought I was in Paradise.

As the opera season progressed, Bellini found himself caught up in the social whirl, with invitations coming from all around him. His fame was now secure—La sonnambula having established it—and the premiere of Norma, given on 21 June with Pasta in the title role, was a triumph according to a long letter which Giuseppe Pasta wrote about the experience and his wife's huge success. Additionally, reports in the London press were favourable, including the review which appeared in The Times of 23 June 1833. It took until late July for I Capuleti e i Montecchi to be given its London premiere, and his contract was then over, after which he left for Paris by about mid-August.

== Paris: August 1833 to January 1835 ==
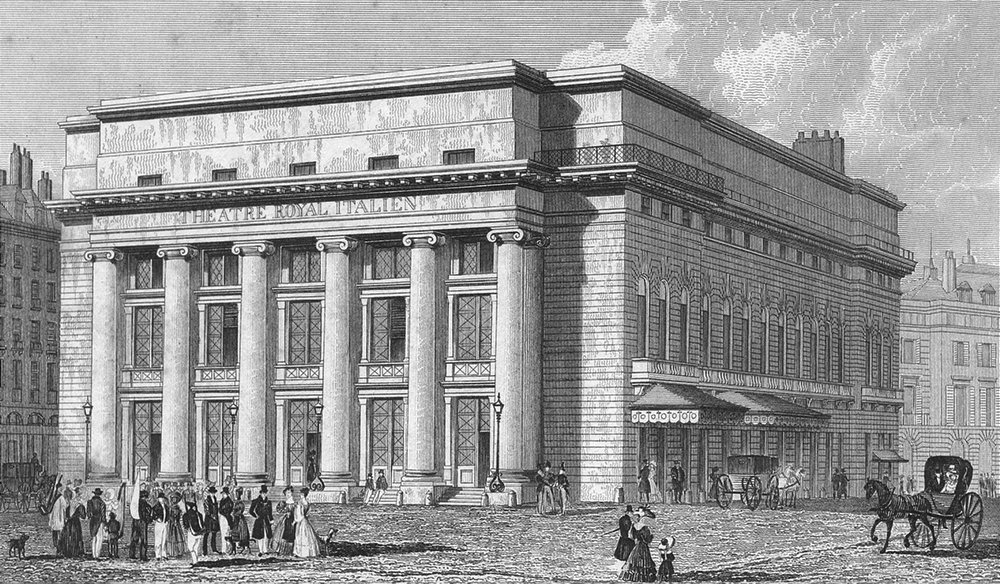
The Théâtre-Italien in 1829

When he arrived in Paris in mid-August 1833, Bellini had intended to stay only about three weeks, the main aim being to continue the negotiations with the Opéra which had begun on his way to London a few months earlier. While there was no agreement with Véron at the Opéra, the Théâtre-Italien made him an offer which, Bellini notes, he accepted because "the pay was richer than what I had received in Italy up to then, though only by a little; then because of so magnificent a company; and finally so as to remain in Paris at others' expense."

In fact, Éduard Robert and Carlo Severini of the Italien had written to the composer, offering a seat in their theatre during his stay in the city and telling him that Grisi, Unger, and Rubini would be singing Pirata in October and Capuleti in November. But with no definite arrangements having been made to compose for the Italian house—and Bellini essentially not wishing to proceed with an offer from Turin to stage Norma—he settled into a new, small apartment. He wrote to Florimo, telling him about the lodgings and that he had written to Turina not to sell any of his furniture, but to send some of it to him.

Quickly, Bellini entered the fashionable world of the Parisian salon, most importantly that run by the Italian exile Princess Belgiojoso whom he had met in Milan and who "was by far the most overtly political of the salonnières". Her salon became a meeting place for Italian revolutionaries such as Vincenzo Gioberti, Niccolò Tommaseo, and Camillo Cavour, and it was there that he would have most likely made the acquaintance of his future librettist Count Carlo Pepoli of Bologna, who had been forced into exile in France and England for his opposition to the Austrian domination of Italy. Others that Bellini would have met included Victor Hugo, George Sand, Alexandre Dumas pėre, and Heinrich Heine. Among the many musical figures were several Italians, such as Michele Carafa and the imposing Luigi Cherubini, then in his seventies.

In terms of musical activity—or lack thereof—Bellini pleaded guilty in the letter to Florimo in March 1834: "If you reflect for a moment that a young man in my position, in London and Paris for the first time, cannot help amusing himself immensely, you will excuse me." However, in January 1834, he had signed a contract to write a new opera for the Théâtre-Italien which would be presented at the end of the year. At the same time, he had been invited to write a new opera for the San Carlo in Naples for the 1834–35 Carnival season, but declined given the Paris commitment and stated that it might be possible to do so by May 1835, when he knew who were to be the contracted singers. Florimo immediately began to try to persuade his friend to take up this offer, indicating that Malibran had been engaged for Naples in January 1835.

On a professional level, Bellini became very concerned around the middle of April 1834, when he learned that Donizetti would be composing for the Théâtre-Italien during the same season, 1834–35. According to Weinstock, quoting letters sent to Florimo in Italy at around that time (and continuing almost up to the premiere of I puritani), Bellini perceived this to be a plot orchestrated by Rossini. In a long, rambling letter of 2,500 words to Florino of 11 March 1834, he expresses his frustrations.

But over a year later and with hindsight—after Puritani's great success which came way ahead of that of Donizetti's first work for Paris, Marin Faliero—he outlines "the plot which was being hatched against me" and the strategies which he adopted to counter it. These strategies included expanding his contacts with Rossini to secure his growing friendship by continuing to see him on numerous occasions to seek his advice, noting "I have always adored Rossini, and I succeeded, and happily ... [having] tamed Rossini's hatred, I no longer was frightened and finished that work of mine which won me so much honour". In a series of letters to Florimo throughout the year, he wrote of Rossini's increasing support, even love: "I hear that he speaks well of me" (4 September 1834); "... if I have Rossini's protection, I'll be situated very well" (4 November); "The most beautiful is that Rossini loves me very, very, very much" (18 November); and "... my very dear Rossini who now loves me as a son" (21 January 1835, following the dress rehearsal).

However, during the time during which he was composing Puritani, Bellini recounted the details of another bout of what he describes as "gastric fever" and which Weinstock describes as "that brief indisposition, which had been recurring almost every year at the onset of warm weather".

=== I puritani: January 1834 to January 1835 ===
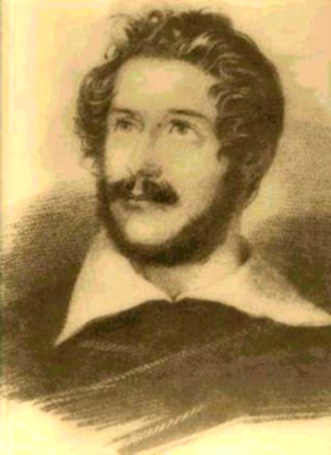
Librettist Carlo Pepoli

Having signed the contract for a new opera, Bellini began to look around for a suitable subject and, in a letter to Florimo of 11 March 1834, he alludes to the opera which was to become I puritani, noting: "I am about to lose my mind over the plot of the opera for Paris, as it has been impossible to find a suitable subject for my purpose and adaptable to the company".

In the same letter, he continues by stating that he was working towards finding a subject with the Italian émigré, Carlo Pepoli. Although Pepoli had yet to write for the opera house, he made acquaintance with Bellini at one of the salons both attended. The process of writing the libretto and working with the composer was a struggle (notes Weinstock), added to by a period of illness which Bellini reports, although—on 11 April—he is able to report in a letter to Ferlito that he was well and that "I have chosen the story for my Paris opera; it is of the times of Cromvello [Cromwell], after he had King Charles I of England beheaded." In his letter, he continues by providing a synopsis, indicating that his favourite singers—Giulia Grisi, Rubini, Tamburini, and Lablache—would be available for the principal roles, and that he would begin to write the music by 15 April if he has received the verses. He also referred to the offer from Naples for April 1836 and noting his financial demands with the questions as to how this might be received.

The chosen source was a play performed in Paris only six months before, Têtes Rondes et Cavalieres (Roundheads and Cavaliers), written by Jacques-François Ancelot and Joseph Xavier Saintine, which some sources state was based on Walter Scott's novel Old Mortality, while others state that there is no connection. The composer had prepared the way for his librettist by providing him with a scenario of thirty-nine scenes (thus compressing the original drama into manageable proportions), reducing the number of characters from nine to seven and at the same time, giving them names of a more Italianate, singable quality.

Continuing to work on the yet-unnamed I Puritani, Bellini moved to Puteaux—"a half an hour by road" from central Paris, as the guest of an English friend, Samuel Levys, "where I hope to complete my opera more carefully". At some time in the late Spring (specific date unknown) Bellini wrote to Pepoli to remind him that he should bring the first act of the opera with him the following day "so that we can finish discussing the first act, which ... will be interesting, magnificent, and proper poetry for music in spite of you and all your absurd rules ..." At the same time, he lays out one basic rule for the librettist to follow:

Carve into your head in adamantine letters: The opera must draw tears, terrify people, make them die through singing

By late June, there had been considerable progress and, in a letter copied into one written to Florimo on 25 July, Bellini writes in reply to Alesandro Lanari, now the director of the Royal Theatres of Naples. Because Lanari had written to him on 10 April 1834 regarding an opera for Naples, Bellini tells him that the first act of Puritani is finished and that he expects to complete the opera by September, in order that he may then have time to write for Naples. In this letter to Lanari, the composer lays down some very strict terms, some of which received counter-offers in August, but none of which were accepted by the composer. Finally, Bellini stated that he did not want "to negotiate with anybody until I see what success my opera will have". This included a proposal from the Opéra-Comique for a new opera for them.)

By September he was writing to Florimo of being able to "polish and re-polish" in the three remaining months before rehearsals and he expresses happiness with Pepoli's verses ("a very beautiful trio for the two basses and La Grisi")and by around mid-December he had submitted the score for Rossini's approval, with rehearsals planned for late December/early January. The dress rehearsal on 20 January 1835 was attended by many people—"All of high society, all the great artists, and everyone most distinguished in Paris were in the theatre, enthusiastic."—and the premiere, postponed by two days, took place on 24 January 1835. Bellini's ecstatic letter to Florimo, which followed, recounts the enthusiastic reception of many of the numbers throughout the performance, most especially the second act stretta so that, by its end:

The French had all gone mad; there were such noise and such shouts that they themselves were astonished at being so carried away. ... In a word, my dear Florimo, it was an unheard of thing, and since Saturday, Paris has spoken of it in amazement. ... I showed myself to the audience, which shouted as if insane. ... How satisfied I am! [He concludes by noting the success of the singers]: "Lablache sang like a god, Grisi like a little angel, Rubini and Tamburini the same."

The opera became "the rage of Paris" and was given 17 performances to end the season on 31 March.

== Paris: January to September 1835 ==
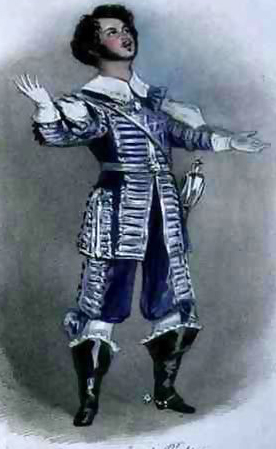
Rubini as Arturo in I Puritani, Paris 1835

In the immediate aftermath of I puritani's success, Bellini was awarded two honours: the first by King Louis-Philippe, naming him as chevalier of the Légion d'honneur; the second by King Ferdinand II in Naples, awarding him the cross of the "Order of Francesco I". Bellini then dedicated I puritiani "To the Queen of the French", Queen Marie-Emélie. But from a personal point of view, Bellini expressed his sadness at not having seen Florimo for so long, and there flowed a succession of invitations, then demands that Florimo come to Paris to visit him, but from February to July, Florimo ignored the offers and finally, in a letter to him, Bellini stated: "I'll no longer ask for reasons, and I'll see you when I see you." After that, he attempted to persuade his uncle, Vincenzo Ferlito, to visit, but without success.

During the final preparations in 1834 for the staging of Puritani and up to its delay into 1835, Bellini had concluded an agreement with Naples to present three operas there—including the re-writing of parts of the music for Malibran—beginning in the following January. All that went by the wayside when the revised score failed to arrive on time, and performances were abandoned and the contract was scrapped. Thus, during March, Bellini did nothing, but did attend the final performance of Puritani on the 31st. On 1 April, he wrote a very lengthy letter to Ferlito laying out the entire history of his life in Paris to date, as well as reviving the old jealousies about Donizetti and Rossini's so-called "enmity" toward him. He ended by mentioning that "my future plans are to be able to arrange a contract with the French Grand Opéra and remain in Paris, making it my home for the present." Additionally, he discusses the prospect of marriage to a young woman who "is not rich, but she has an uncle and aunt who are: if they will give her 200,000 francs, I'll marry her", but remarks that he is in no hurry.

Throughout May, accounts came to him from London of the success of I puritani and the failure of a revival of Norma (due to the poor performances by both the Adalgisa and Pollione), although later reports of Giulietta Grisi's Norma—in contrast to those of Pasta—were not good either, and Bellini was pleased that it was not Grisi who gave the opera in Paris. Over the summer, Bellini's general mood was reported to be "dark": discussion with the Opéra could not proceed until a new director was appointed; "he writes long letters, crowded with projects, ideas, reveries that the hand seems to have trouble restraining"; and, as Weintock concludes, all of these things seem to "inescapably suggest a man deeply disturbed physically, psychologically, or both".

At one of the literary gatherings which Bellini attended earlier in the year, Bellini met the writer Heinrich Heine. Both men then attended a dinner that summer, at which the writer is reported to have remarked:

You are a genius, Bellini, but you will pay for your great gift with a premature death. All the great geniuses died very young, like Raphael and like Mozart.

The rather superstitious Bellini was horrified. Also, Heine's literary portrait of Bellini, which became part of his unfinished novel Florentinische Nächte (Florentine Nights) published in 1837, emphasized the less-appealing aspects of the composer's personality, summing up a description of him as "a sigh in dancing pumps".

In his last-known letter to Filippo Santocanale, Bellini wrote on 16 August, followed by one to Florimo on 2 September. In the latter, he mentions that "for three days I've been slightly disturbed by a diarrhea, but I am better now, and think that it is over."

== Final illness and death ==
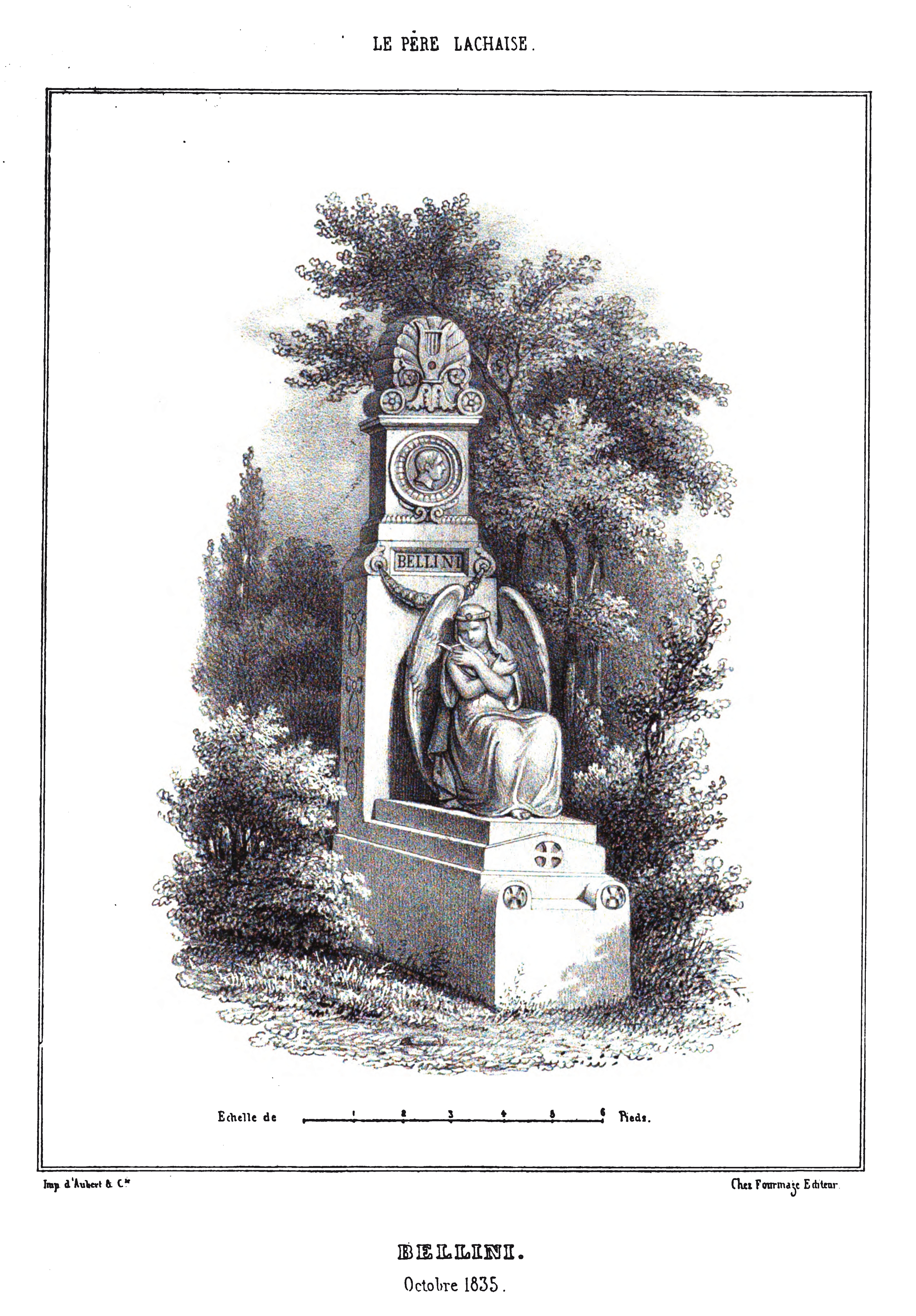
Monument to Bellini erected in 1839 at Père Lachaise Cemetery

It was clear from Bellini's reaction to Heine's remarks that he did not like Heine. Attempting to reconcile the two men, Madame Joubert, who had attended the summer event, invited both to dinner, along with her friend, the Princess Belgiojoso. Bellini failed to appear; instead, he sent a note stating that he was too ill. Weinstock reports that the princess sent Doctor Luigi Montallegri to Puteaux. Over a few days, he reported to Carlo Severini of the Théatre-Italien with four notes, the first (on 20 September) stated "no appreciable improvement". On the following day, Montallegri reported a slight improvement, and on the 22nd, the doctor stated that he "hopes to declare him out of danger tomorrow". However, the fourth note—on 22 September—is far more pessimistic; it reported that it was the thirteenth day of the illness and that Bellini had "passed a very restless night". And then, during the daytime of the 23rd, Montallegri indicated that there had been what Weinstock describes as "a terrifying convulsion" and that death was close. It appears that Bellini died at around 5 pm on 23 September 1835.

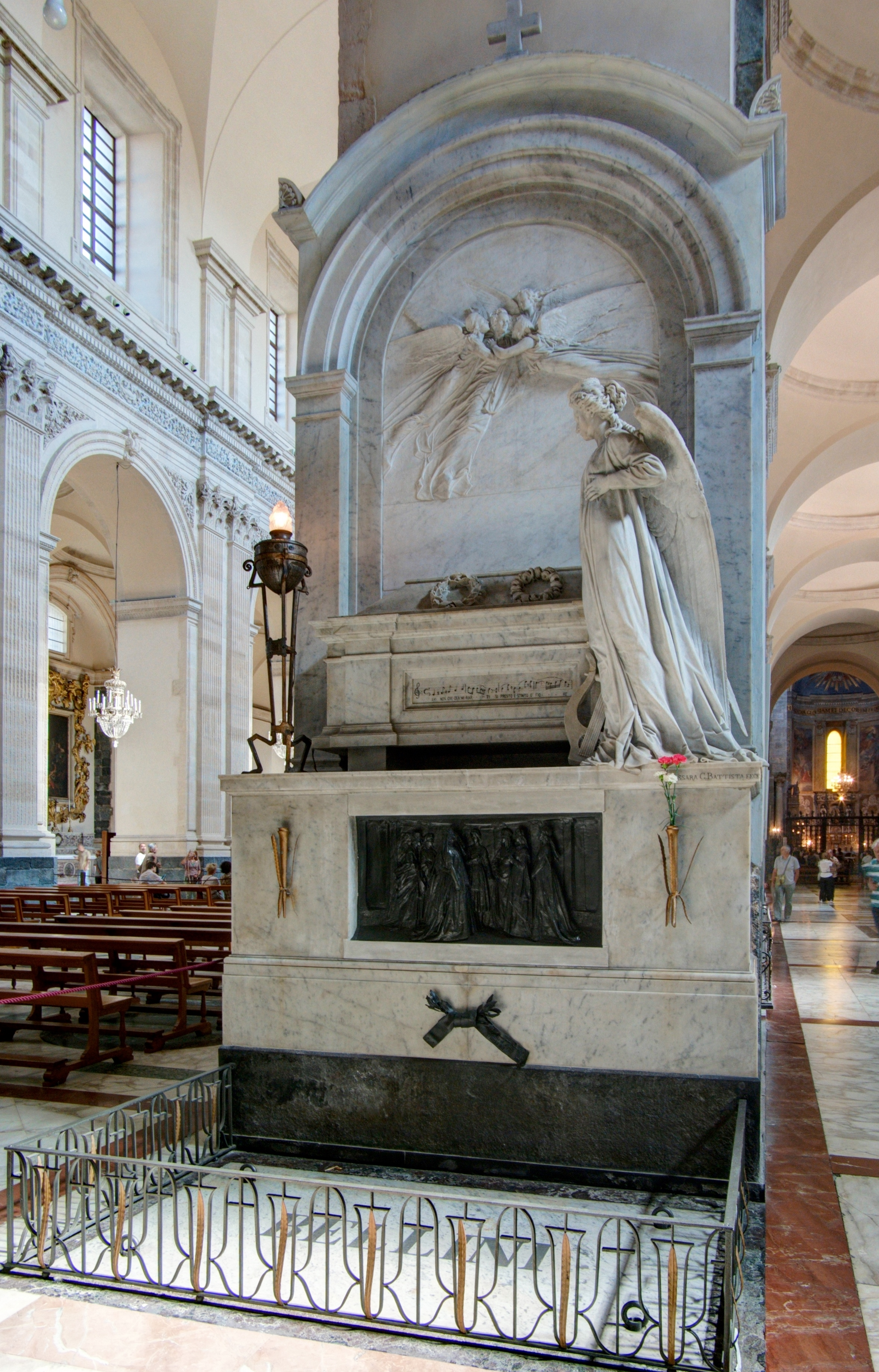
Bellini's tomb in Catania Cathedral in Sicily

Immediately taking charge of arrangements, Rossini began to plan Bellini's funeral and entombment, as well as caring for his estate. He ordered that a post-mortem be performed, following an order which came directly from the King. The distinguished Court-appointed Doctor Dalmas performed the autopsy and reported his findings on the cause of death:

It is evident that Bellini succumbed to an acute inflammation of the colon, compounded by an abscess in the liver. The inflammation of the intestine had produced violent symptoms of dysentery during life.

Rossini then created a committee of Parisian musicians in order to find support for a subscription to build a monument to the dead composer, as well as supporting a funeral mass to be celebrated on 2 October in the chapel of the Hôtel des Invalides.

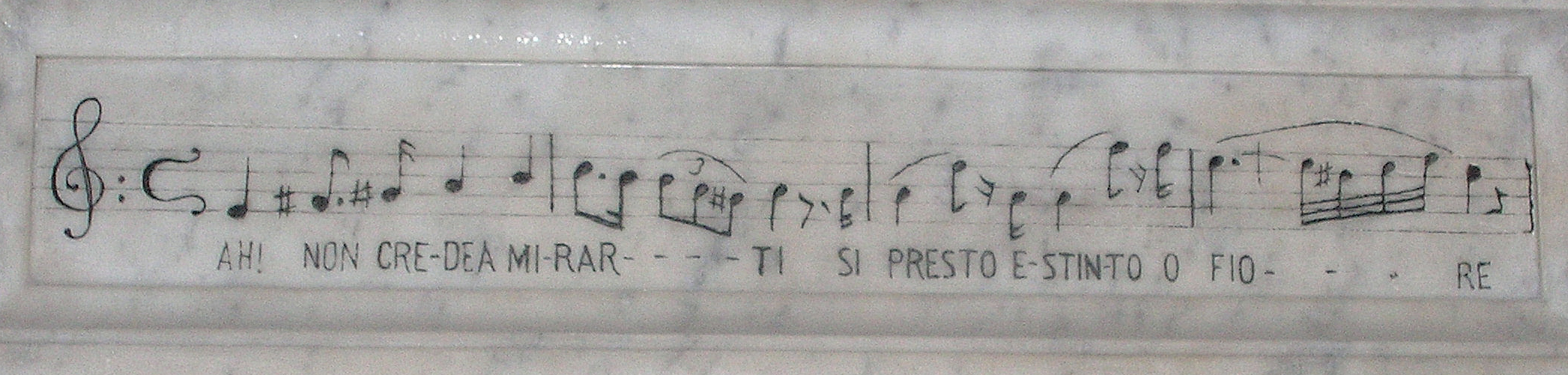
Musical notation, inscribed on Bellini's tomb, from Amina's last aria in La sonnambula: "Ah! non-credea mirarti / Sì presto estinto, o fiore", translated as: "I did not believe you would fade so soon, oh flower"

On 27 September and 3 October, Rossini wrote to Santocanale in Palermo providing very detailed accounts of all that he had done immediately following Bellini's death as well as what had taken place on 2 October. Initially, Rossini regarded burial in Père Lachaise Cemetery as a short-term arrangement, not knowing where the final resting place would turn out to be. Despite attempts over many years to have Bellini's remains transferred to Catania, that did not take place until 1876, when the casket containing his remains was taken to the cathedral in Catania and reburied. His elaborate now empty tomb in Père Lachaise Cemetery remains and is neighbouring that of Rossini, whose bones were also eventually transferred back to Italy.

Of the many tributes which poured forth following Bellini's death, one stands out. It was written by Felice Romani and published in Turin on 1 October 1835. In it, he stated:

... Perhaps no composers other than ours, know as well as Bellini the necessity for a close union of music with poetry, dramatic truth, the language of emotions, the proof of expression. ... I sweated for fifteen years to find a Bellini! A single day took him from me!

Today, the Museo Belliniano, housed in the Palazzo Gravina-Cruyllas in Catania—Bellini's birthplace—preserves memorabilia and manuscripts. He was commemorated on the front of the Banca d'Italia 5,000 lire banknote in the 1980s and 90s (before Italy switched to the Euro) with the back showing a scene from the opera Norma.

== Bellini, romanticism and melodrama ==
When planning the subject of his next opera after La Scala's Il pirata, Bellini had been invited to write an opera for Parma's inauguration of the new Teatro Ducale in early 1829. In the initial contract, Bellini was given power over who was to write the libretto and, after meeting the composer and prima donna, the Parman librettist Luigi Torrigiani's work had been rejected. The aspiring librettist laid a complaint against Bellini in a report to Parma's Grand Chamberlain in December 1828 (which was ignored). In it, the aggrieved librettist sums up Bellini's tastes in Romantic drama: "[he] likes Romanticism and exaggeration. He declares that Classicism is cold and boring. ... He is entranced by unnatural meetings in forests, among graves, tombs and the like ..."

In writing the libretto for Zaira, Romani expressed his position in relation to Voltaire's tragedy by noting in the preface to the libretto: "Zaira therefore is not covered with the ample cloak of Tragedy but wrapped in the tight form of Melodrama."

== Personal life and relationships ==
Bellini was a notorious womaniser as evidenced in his letters to Francesco Florimo. However, three people had a prominent place in his life: Francesco Florimo, Maddelena Fumaroli and Giuditta Turina.

=== Francesco Florimo ===
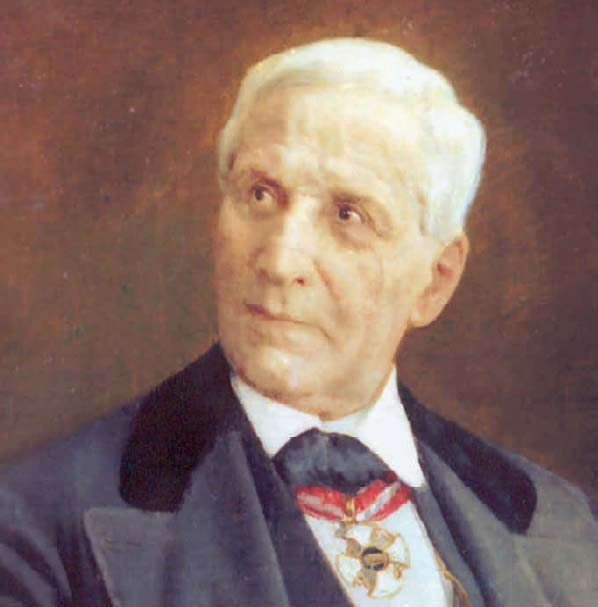
A portrait of Francesco Florimo in later life

One of the closest people in Bellini's life was Francesco Florimo, whom he met as a fellow student at the Naples Conservatory. Throughout Bellini's lifetime, the two shared a close correspondence. During the 1820 revolution, Bellini and Florimo joined a secret society, the Carboneria. Their closeness is evident in their letters. For example, on 12 January 1828, Bellini wrote that theirs were "hearts made only to be friends to the last breath." Bellini wrote in 1825 that "Your existence is necessary to mine". Further, on 11 February 1835, Bellini wrote: " my excellent, my honest, my angelic friend! The more we know the world, the more we shall see how rare is our friendship." Based on these letters, some have speculated about Bellini's sexuality, but Weinstock (1971) believed such interpretations are anachronistic. Rosselli (1996) expands on this point: contrary to how they may seem to modern readers, the expressions of close friendship in these letters were commonplace in Mediterranean societies and the world of early 1800s Italian opera rather than a reflection of sexual attachment. Once Bellini left Naples for Milan, the two men seldom saw one another; their last meeting was in Naples in late 1832, when Bellini was there with Giuditta Turina, before the pair departed for Milan via Florence. Florimo's published recollections—written fifty years after the events they recall—may be flawed. In later years, Bellini declared that Florimo "was the only friend in whom [I] could find comfort". Interpretation of Florimo's collection of letters is complicated however by evidence that he often altered or completely fabricated some of his correspondences with Bellini to create an idealized image of the composer. Florimo was also known to have destroyed some compromising letters involving Bellini's affairs with married women, including some in which Bellini wrote in detail about his affair with Giuditta Turina. After Bellini's death Florimo became his literary executor.

=== Maddalena Fumaroli ===
Although the frustrating affair with Maddalena Fumaroli, which, as noted above, came to nothing during these early years, the success achieved by Bianca e Gernado gave Bellini fresh hope that her parents would finally relent, and a new appeal was made through a friend. This was utterly rejected by Maddalena's father, who returned all the letters which she had received along with a letter from him stating that "my daughter will never marry a poor piano player (suonatore di cembalo)". However, when Florimo gave him the news, he said that he was going to try again and win, but the next move was to come later from the Fumaroli family.

At some time before March 1828, after the major success of Il pirata and just as Bellini was about to leave Milan for his production of Bianca e Ferdinando in Genoa, he received a notification from his go-between with the Fumaroli family that they had withdrawn their rejection of his proposal. But by then—with the efforts to build his career and with time and distance between him and Maddalena—his feelings had changed, and, using Florimo to communicate to the family, he rejected the offer, expressing the feeling that he would be unable to support her financially. Even Maddalena's own pleas in three letters which followed failed to change his mind.

=== Giuditta Turina ===
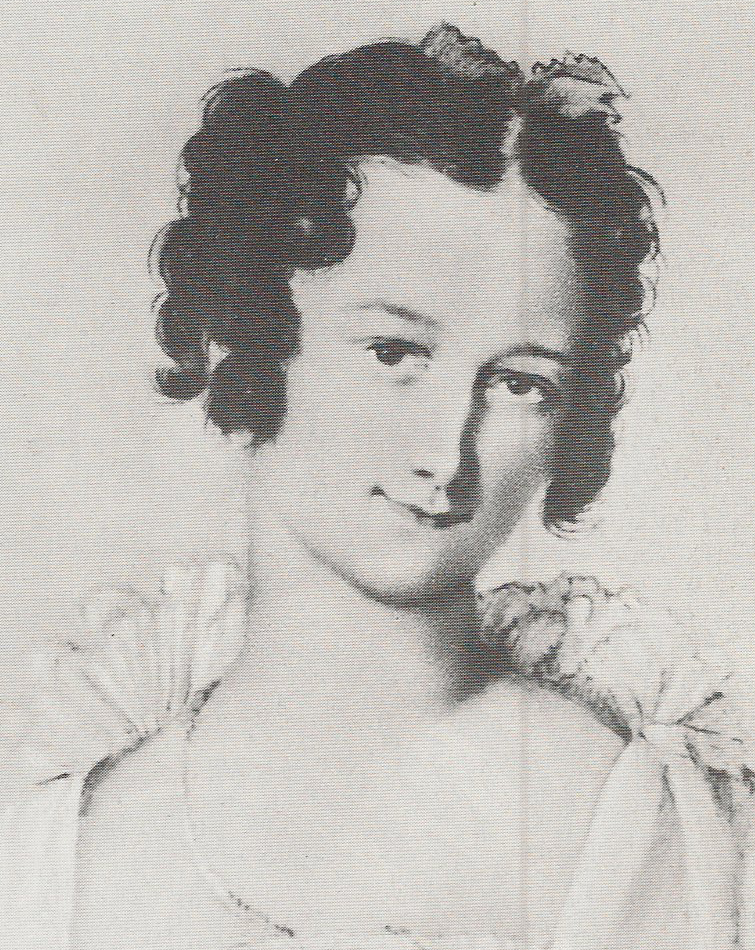
Giuditta Turina

The one significant relationship which Bellini had after 1828 was the five-year relationship with Giuditta Turina, a young married woman with whom he began a passionate affair when both were in Genoa in April 1828 for the production of Bianca e Fernando. Their relationship lasted until Bellini went to Paris. Bellini's letters to his friend Florimo indicate his satisfaction with the nature of the liaison, particularly because it kept him from having to marry—and thus becoming distracted from his work.

However, in May 1833, while he was in London, a significant change in Bellini's relationship with Giuditta followed from the discovery by her husband of a compromising letter from Bellini. The result was that he decided to seek a legal separation and have her removed from his house. For Bellini, it meant the possibility of taking on responsibility for her, and he had no interest in doing that, having cooled in his feelings for her. When he wrote to Florimo from Paris the following year, he clearly stated that "I constantly am being threatened from Milan with Giuditta's coming to Paris", at which point he says he'll leave that city if that were to happen. Then he continues: "I no longer want to be put in the position of renewing a relationship that made me suffer great troubles". When Turina announced that she was leaving her husband, Bellini left her, saying "with so many commitments, such a relationship would be fatal to me," expressing his fear of romantic attachments getting in the way of his musical career. Ultimately, he resisted any long-term emotional commitment and never married.

However, Turina maintained contact with Florimo throughout her life, although [nothing] was heard from her after Bellini's death until she wrote a sad-but-friendly letter to Florimo. Florimo eventually returned the friendship and, as Galatopoulos notes, "the death of Bellini was a mutual loss and Florimo needed Giuditta as much as she needed him" so that the two corresponded for years and Florimo visited her in Milan "at least once, in 1858". She died on 1 December 1871.

== Complete works ==
=== Operas ===
In 1999, the Italian music publisher Casa Ricordi, in collaboration with the Teatro Massimo Bellini in Catania, embarked on a project to publish critical editions of the complete works of Bellini.

Operas by Vincenzo Bellini
Title	Genre	Acts	Libretto	Premiere	
Title	Genre	Acts	Libretto	Date	Venue
Adelson e Salvini	opera semiseria	3 acts	Andrea Leone Tottola	12 (?) February 1825	Naples, Teatro del Conservatorio di San Sebastiano
Bianca e Gernando	melodramma	2 acts	Domenico Gilardoni	30 May 1826	Naples, Teatro San Carlo
Il pirata	melodramma	2 acts	Felice Romani	27 October 1827	Milan, Teatro alla Scala
Bianca e Fernando (revision of Bianca e Gernando)	melodramma	2 acts	Felice Romani	7 April 1828	Genoa, Teatro Carlo Felice
La straniera	melodramma	2 acts	Felice Romani	14 February 1829	Milan, Teatro alla Scala
Zaira	tragedia lirica	2 acts	Felice Romani	16 May 1829	Parma, Teatro Ducale
I Capuleti e i Montecchi	tragedia lirica	2 acts	Felice Romani	11 March 1830	Venice, Teatro La Fenice
La sonnambula	opera semiseria	2 acts	Felice Romani	6 March 1831	Milan, Teatro Carcano
Norma	tragedia lirica	2 acts	Felice Romani	26 December 1831	Milan, Teatro alla Scala
Beatrice di Tenda	tragedia lirica	2 acts	Felice Romani	16 March 1833	Venice, Teatro La Fenice
I puritani	melodramma serio	3 acts	Carlo Pepoli	24 January 1835	Paris, Théâtre-Italien

=== Songs ===
The following fifteen songs were published as a collection, Composizioni da Camera, by Casa Ricordi in 1935 on the centenary of Bellini's death.

Six Early Songs

- "La farfalletta" – canzoncina
- "Quando incise su quel marmo" – scena ed aria
- "Sogno d'infanzia" – romanza
- "L'abbandono" – romanza
- "L'allegro marinaro" – ballata
- "Torna, vezzosa Fillide" – romanza

Tre Ariette

- "Il fervido Desiderio"
- "Dolente immagine di Fille mia"
- "Vaga luna, che inargenti"

Sei Ariette

- "Malinconia, Ninfa gentile"
- "Vanne, o rosa fortunata"
- "Bella Nice, che d'amore"
- "Almen se non poss'io"
- "Per pietà, bell'idol mio"
- "Ma rendi pur contento"

=== Other works ===
- Eight symphonies, including a Capriccio, ossia Sinfonia per studio (Capriccio or Study Symphony), composed around 1820. Bellini's symphonies are short works (typically under ten minutes) in the Italian overture tradition rather than in the Germanic tradition of Beethoven.
- Oboe Concerto in E-flat major (c. 1823)
- seven piano works, three of them for four hands
- an Organ Sonata in G major
- 40 sacred works, including:
  - ("Catania" No. 1) Mass in D major (1818)
  - ("Catania" No. 2) Mass in G major (1818)
  - Messa di Gloria in A minor for soloists, choir and orchestra (1821)
  - Mass in E minor (Naples, c. 1823)
  - Mass in G minor (Naples, c. 1823)
  - Salve Regina in A major for choir and orchestra (c. 1820)
  - Salve Regina in F minor for soprano and piano (c. 1820)

== See also ==
Other important bel canto opera composers:

- Gioachino Rossini
- Gaetano Donizetti
- Saverio Mercadante
