= Composizioni da Camera (Bellini) =

The Composizioni da Camera is a set of fifteen collected compositions for voice and piano by the Italian opera composer, Vincenzo Bellini. They were likely composed in the 1820s while Bellini was in the Italian cities of Naples and Milan, before his departure for Paris.

== Publication ==
First published under the title Composizioni da Camera by the Milan publisher Ricordi in 1935 on the centenary of Bellini's death, it is unlikely that Bellini ever considered these works as a whole. The collection consists of three main sections. The first is a group of six compositions of varying genres, while the second and third sections contain three and six compositions, respectively, called ariette.

== Contents ==
| Title | Genre | First Line |
|---|---|---|
| La farfalletta | Canzoncina | Farfalletta, aspetta aspetta |
| Quando incise su quel marmo | Scena ed Aria | Questa è la valle, il sasso è questo |
| Sogno d'infanzia | Romanza | Soave sogno de' miei primi anni |
| L'abbandono | Romanza | Solitario zeffiretto |
| L'allegro marinaro | Ballata | Allor che azzurro il mar Sereno |
| Torna, vezzosa Fillide | Romanza | Torna, vezzosa Fillide |
| Il fervido desiderio | Arietta | Quando verrà quel dì |
| Dolente immagine di Fille mia | Arietta | Dolente immagine di Fille mia |
| Vaga luna, che inargenti | Arietta | Vaga luna, che inargenti |
| Malinconia, Ninfa gentile | Arietta | Malinconia, Ninfa gentile |
| Vanne, o rosa fortunata | Arietta | Vanne, o rosa fortunata |
| Bella Nice, che d'amore | Arietta | Bella Nice, che d'amore |
| Almen se non poss'io | Arietta | Almen se non poss'io |
| Per pietà, bell'idol mio | Arietta | Per pietà, bell'idol mio |
| Ma rendi pur contento | Arietta | Ma rendi pur contento |

== Style ==
The general style of these works is more simplistic and tuneful than Bellini's operatic text-setting. While the romanzas may contain some dramatic elements, the ariette conform to a song-like melody as in Vaga luna, che inargenti. This famous example is strophic and plainly sung with scant accompaniment. This kind of texture contrasts strikingly against Bellini's melodramatic and emotive arias in operas like Norma.

While these works find few similarities with the operatic style of the early 19th century, it is likely that some folk influence, especially from Bellini's native Sicily, may have inspired their melodies. The poetry is in most cases anonymous and usually incorporates a folk meter. In response to their romantic theme and florid imagery, Bellini provides restrained and enchanting melodies. Each piece within Composizioni da Camera revolves around a common theme: unrequited love.

== Performance practice ==
Bellini's Composizioni da Camera have become a recital favorite of many singers. This resurgence of interest in Bellini's non-operatic works may perhaps be attributed to performances by singers like Luciano Pavarotti. The famous tenor performed five of these songs at the Metropolitan Opera with James Levine in a 1988 recital. Like Pavarotti, most singers present only certain selections from this work. Similarly, the program order and key of each piece is open to the performer's discretion.

== Recordings ==
- An Italian Songbook, Cecilia Bartoli (mezzo-soprano), James Levine (piano), contains "Vaga luna che inargenti", "Per pietà, bell' idol mio", "Farfalletta", "Dolente immagine di fille mia", "Vanne, o rosa fortunata", "Torna vezzosa fillide", "Il fervido desiderio", "Malinconia, ninfa gentile", and "L'abbandono". Label: Decca
- Luciano Pavarotti - Live Recital, Luciano Pavarotti (tenor), Leone Magiera (piano), contains "Dolente immagine di fille mia", "Malinconia, ninfa gentile", "Vanne, o rosa fortunata", "Bella Nice, che d'amore" and "Ma rendi pur contento". Label: Decca

== Sources ==
- Elliott, Martha (2006). Singing in style: A guide to vocal performance practices. Yale University Press. ISBN 0-300-10932-6
- Paton, John Glenn (2004). Gateway to Italian Songs and Arias: Low Voice, Alfred Music Publishing. ISBN 0-7390-3549-5
- Sanvitale, Francesco (2002). La romanza italiana da salotto. EDT srl. ISBN 88-7063-615-1
