= Vaga luna, che inargenti =

1838 arietta composed by Vincenzo Bellini

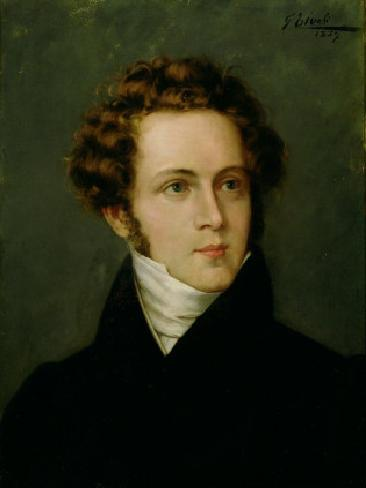
Vincenzo Bellini (1801–1835), the composer of "Vaga luna, che inargenti"

"Vaga luna, che inargenti" (Beautiful moon, dappling with silver) is an arietta composed by Vincenzo Bellini to an anonymous Italian text and dedicated to Giulietta Pezzi. It was published in 1838 by Casa Ricordi in Tre ariette inedite along with two other Bellini songs, "Il fervido desiderio" and "Dolente immagine di Fille mia". It was also amongst the fifteen Bellini songs published by Ricordi under the title Composizioni da Camera in 1935, the centenary of the composer's death. Composed in the bel canto style, it is a frequent recital piece, and has often been recorded. Its original key is in A-flat major with a tempo of andante cantabile.

== Lyrics ==
Vaga luna, che inargenti
queste rive e questi fiori
ed inspiri agli elementi
il linguaggio dell'amor;

testimonio or sei tu sola
del mio fervido desir,
ed a lei che m'innamora
conta i palpiti e i sospir.

Dille pur che lontananza
il mio duol non può lenire,
che se nutro una speranza,
ella è sol nell'avvenir.

Dille pur che giorno e sera
conto l'ore del dolor,
che una speme lusinghiera
mi conforta nell'amor.

Beautiful moon, dappling with silver
These banks and flowers,
Evoking from the elements
The language of love

Only you are witness
To my ardent desire;
Go tell her, tell my beloved
How much I long for her and sigh.

Tell her that with her so far away,
My grief can never be allayed,
That the only hope I cherish
Is for my future to be spent with her.

Tell her that day and night
I count the hours of my yearning,
That hope, a sweet hope beckons,
And comforts me in my love.

== Sources ==
- Paton, John Glenn (2004). Gateway to Italian Songs and Arias: High Voice. Alfred Music Publishing, pp. 130–135. ISBN 0-7390-3547-9
