= Pezzi =

Pezzi is an Italian surname. Notable people with the surname include:

- Andrea Pezzi (born 1973), Italian TV presenter, writer and entrepreneur
- Enrico Pezzi (general) (1897–1942), Italian Air Force general
- Enrico Pezzi (footballer) (born 1989), Italian footballer
- Giulietta Pezzi (1810–1878), Italian writer and journalist
- Jürgen Pezzi, Italian luger
- Luciano Pezzi (1921–1998), Italian cyclist
- Mario Pezzi (aviator) (1898 – 1968), Italian pilot
- Mario Pezzi (priest) (born 1941), leader in the Neocatechumenal Way.
- Paolo Pezzi (born 1960), Italian Roman Catholic archbishop

Other

- Due pezzi (Berio), composition for violin and piano, written by Luciano Berio

== See also ==
- Pezza (surname)
