= Pezza (surname) =

Pezza is an Italian surname. Notable people with the surname include:

- John Pezza (born 1952), an Italian fencer
- Michele Pezza (1771–1806), an Italian guerrilla leader who resisted the French occupation of Naples

== See also ==
- Pezzi
