= Giovanni Spertini =

Italian sculptor (1821–1895)

Giovanni Spertini (Pavia, 1821 - Milan, 1895) was an Italian sculptor.

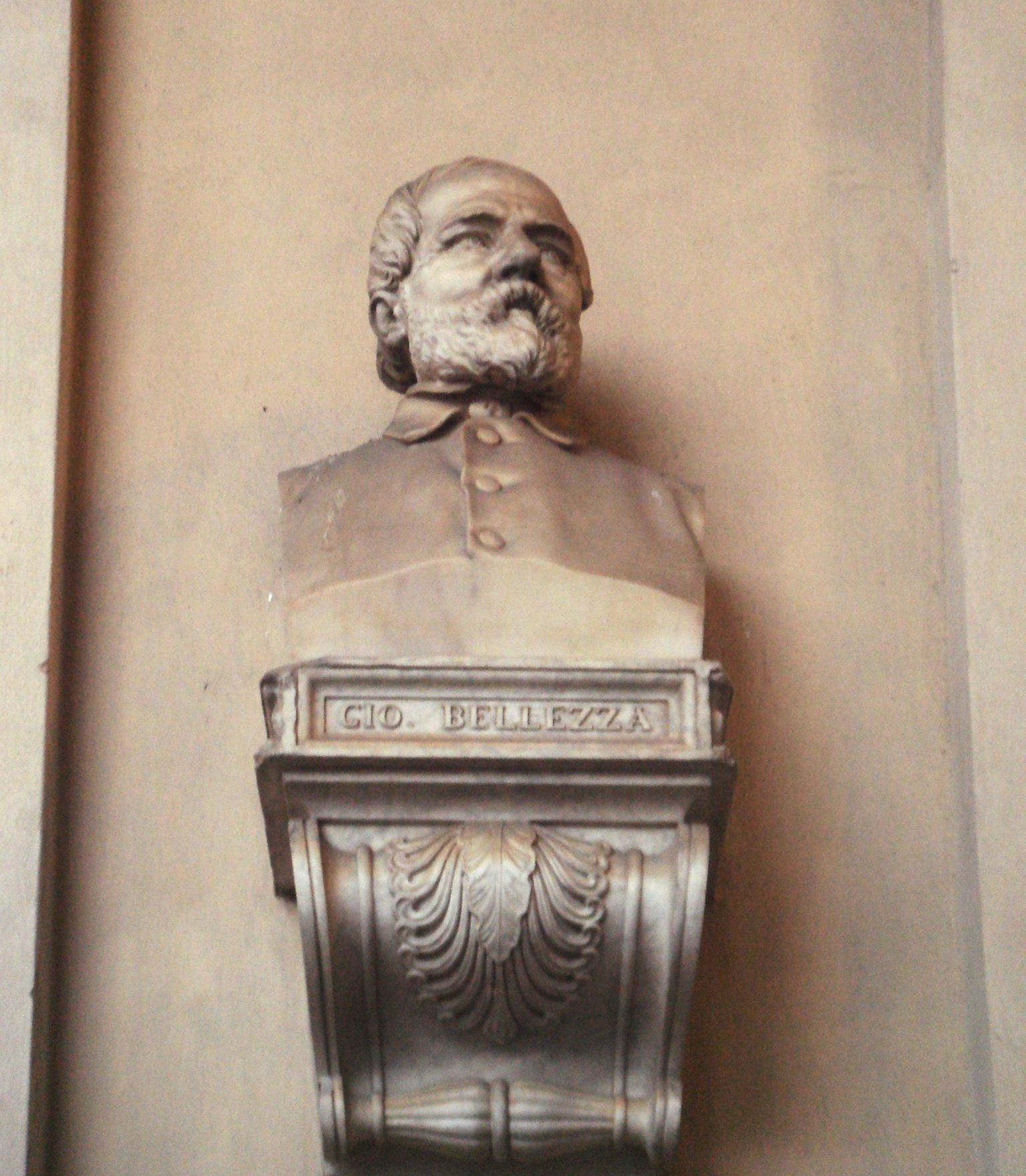
Bust of sculptor Giovanni Bellezza, (1876) located at Brera, Milan.

Beginning in 1836, he studied sculpture at the Brera Academy, and then privately under Gianmaria Benzoni, Giovanni Antonio Labus, and Pietro Magni (sculptor). He became an honorary associate at the Brera.

His first main work as: La scrittrice, also known as the Leggitrice del Magni, which was donated to the Brera. His Columbus Messenger was awarded a prize at the 1876 Exposition of Philadelphia. He won a national contest to sculpt a bust of Mazzini once found in Campidoglio. His statue of Un colpo sicuro was sold at the 1878 Paris Exposition. Among his other notable works, are the larger than life busts of Amilcare Ponchielli and Victor Hugo (stucco, 1886 Exhibition of Fine Arts in Milan). He won a gold medal with honorable diploma at the Didactic and Industrial Exposition of Monza, and the extraordinary award outside of the contest at the Exposition regionale of Pavia. In this time, he was nominated, by contest, professor of modeling at the scuola superiore d'arte applicata all'industria in Milan. At the Exposition of Turin, in 1880, he exhibited seven bas-reliefs in porcelain depicting: six portraits and Conjugal Love, and in the next year at the Exposition of Milan, he exhibited a beautiful work, entitled: Volontario di un anno, a medal depicting the Madonna and Child, and a bust titled: Ingenua, and other two busts in stucco: the first, a Portrait of the Artist, the other a portrait of a Signora. stessa Milan at the Exposition of 1883, where he exhibits: a posthumous Portrait of signor Giacinto Zari (marble bust), by commission for the son Giulio, and another posthumous marble Portrait del signor Gaspare Campori; a marble posthumous bust of Portrait of signor Litigi Provasoli, commissioned by Doctor Pietro Labus and his wife; a bust in stucco depicting: King Vittorio Emanuele II by commission for the City Hall of Castellammare di Stabia. At the 1883 Exhibition of Fine Arts in Rome, he exhibited a porcelain plate depicting a profile of the King Umberto I. In 1884 at Turin, he exhibited un marble bust depicting Senator Antonio Giovanola, a bronze Medallion, and a stucco bust of Farina Mathan. In the 1872 Exhibition of Fine Arts in Milan, he displayed a bas relief depicting a Mater Salvatoris, and a bust in marble of Garibaldi.
