= Monte Pezza (Bologna) =

Mountain in Italy

Monte Pezza is a mountain found just southwest of Bologna, Italy near the area of Monte Sole. The site was the location of the well known World War II battle that took place approximately from October 16–23, 1944. Allied troops (with a main contingent of the 12th South African Motorized Infantry Brigade), fiercely fought the German stronghold that was well positioned on Monte Pezza and the surrounding area.
