= Gazzetta di Milano (1816–1875) =

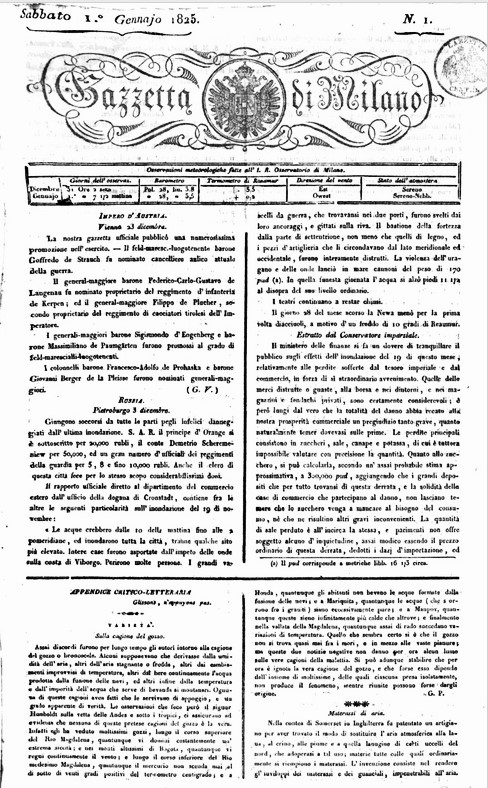
- Type: Daily newspaper
- Founded: 1816
- Ceased publication: 1875
- Language: Italian
- City: Milan

The Gazzetta di Milano (also known as the Gazzetta privilegiata di Milano from 1830 to 1848) was an Italian newspaper published in Milan from 1816 until 1875. It was the official newspaper of the Kingdom of Lombardy–Venetia (a domain of the Austrian Empire) from 1816 until 1859. Its first editor was the Venetian author and critic Francesco Pezzi. After his death in 1831, it was run for two years by his son, Giovanni Giacomo Pezzi (1805–1869) who went on to found the journal Glissons n'appuyons pas.

With the annexation of Lombardy by the Kingdom of Sardinia in 1859, the Gazzetta ceased to be an official newspaper. It was then run by a consortium of four of its writers which included the novelist and critic Giuseppe Rovani. Increasingly in financial difficulty, it ceased publication in 1875. It had been acquired by Edoardo Sonzogno the previous year and was then absorbed by Sonzogno's paper Il Secolo.
