= Francisco Kraus Trujillo =

Spanish baritone

Francisco Kraus Trujillo (21 October 1926 – 27 February 2016) was a Spanish baritone.

He was born in Las Palmas de Gran Canaria (Canary Islands), Spain, on 21 October 1926. His father, Otto Kraus, was born in Austria and Francisco was the first born of the Kraus-Trujillo family; soon would follow Alfredo, Enriqueta Lola and Carmen.

== Vocal technique ==
He and his brother Alfredo began their training with María Suárez Fiol, (born in Madrid, 1897 – died in Las Palmas de Gran Canaria, 1987). The first songs in front of an audience were in the house of his teacher, where Mrs Fiol organized benefit concerts. He started singing in the Choir of the School of the Heart of Maria, and made an audition for Soloists in the Philharmonic Society of Las Palmas. After coming back from Barcelona, Francisco married his fiancé Enedina Kraus. He studied Voice technique in Milan with the famous teacher and Soprano Mercedes Llopart. Mrs Llopart's legacy of exquisite technique and knowledge of voice production was passed on to her students, Alfredo Kraus, Renata Scotto, Anna Moffo, Fiorenza Cossotto, Ivo Vinco, Greek soprano Elena Suliotis, Venezuelan coloratura soprano Cecilia Nuñez Albanese, and Francisco Kraus. Francisco's baritone voice has a wide vocal range, up to a high B with powerful bright, dark, rich notes, placed high in the mask.

== His career ==
In December 1960, Francisco made his Debut in the “Teatro Comunale Giuseppe Verdi” in Trieste with the Moussorgsky opera Khovanshchina in the role of Shaklovity and using the stage name Franco di Marco. Later he continued singing Enrico of Lucia di Lammermoor, Valentin of the opera Faust, and Germont of La Traviata. He returned to Spain where he appeared with the “Festivales of Spain” in La Coruña. He made his debut in the “Teatro de la Zarzuela” in Madrid with the Compañía Lírica Nacional with great success. With this same Company he made a tour of Spain with identical results. In 1962 he formed his own company and toured Spain for four years, singing zarzuela: La Bruja, La Tabernera del Puerto, Katiuska, El Huésped del Sevillano, La Calesera, La Rosa del Azafrán, La del Soto del Parral, and other works of the repertoire with artists like Amparo Azcón, Celia Langa, Pilarín Alvarez, Rosa Gil, Fina Gessa, María Pastor, Eduardo Bermúdez, Enrique del Portal, José Luis Cancela and Andrés García Martí, under the baton of the Maestros Jose Terol and Mariano de las Heras. In Madrid, in June 1963, he performed several presentations of the opera Marina, by the Spanish composer Emilio Arrieta. The performances took place in El Parque del Retiro, with his brother Alfredo.

In 1966 a contract with the company of Maria Francisca Caballer and Agustín Lisbona, to perform in the National Theater of Caracas, “Teatro Nacionál,” took him to Venezuela for one long season. He then returned to the Canary Islands to dedicate more time to family matters. His break from the Operatic scene was not total, however, and in the 1970s he took part in several seasons of Zarzuela with the Isaac Albéniz Company of Juan Jose Seoane, performing all over Spain and the Spanish Islands.

== Career in Venezuela ==
At the end of 1978 Kraus returned to Venezuela for a series of concerts and performances on Radio and Television. He performed in Teatro Municipal de Caracas with Opera Metropolitana de Caracas OMAC the opera Marina, with Alfredo Kraus, soprano Cecilia Núñez Albanese and Cayito Aponte, with the Orquesta Filármonica de Caracas conducted by Dominican Maestro Carlos Piantini. He had a series of concerts in Hogar Canario de Caracas and Teatro Nacional. His brother Alfredo was very often performing in Caracas, Teatro Municipal, with OMAC (Caracas Metropolitan Opera Company). This time the stay would last nine years since, aside from his performances Kraus was offered the position as professor of vocal technique in the Superior School of Music of Caracas, Escuela Superior de Musica J.A. Lamas and also in the Escuela de Música Prudencio Esaá. He was very active as a teacher and some of his students were: Fanny Arjona soprano, Amelia Salazar, Natacha Valladares, Marisol Gil, Alfredo Olarte, Rosaura Longa, and Biella Da Costa.

In 1987, he returned to Spain to teach voice technique at the Conservatory of the “Gran Teatre del Liceu” in Barcelona, where he taught until his retirement.

Retirement

His last public performance took place in Las Palmas de Gran Canaria in 1996, where he was awarded the Gold medal of the city. In July 2000 Kraus and his wife Enedina decided to be based permanently in the city where he was born. In November 2000, Francisco Kraus received the tribute of the Canary Island “Friends of the Zarzuela”, who gave him a Plaque in recognition of his long career.

== Complete recordings ==
La tempestad (1958), Marina (1963). Ed.: Carillón Video. Marina 1974 Teatro Municipal de Caracas. Omac.

“Selección de Zarzuelas”:

El Cantar del Arriero, La Calesera, El Caserío, El Huésped del Sevillano, La Parranda, La Canción del olvido, Molinos de viento, Los Gavilanes, La del Soto del Parral. Ed.: Belter (1973). TV film, German TV ZDF Reiselust. “Gran Canaria”.
