= Elena Souliotis =

Greek soprano (1943–2004)

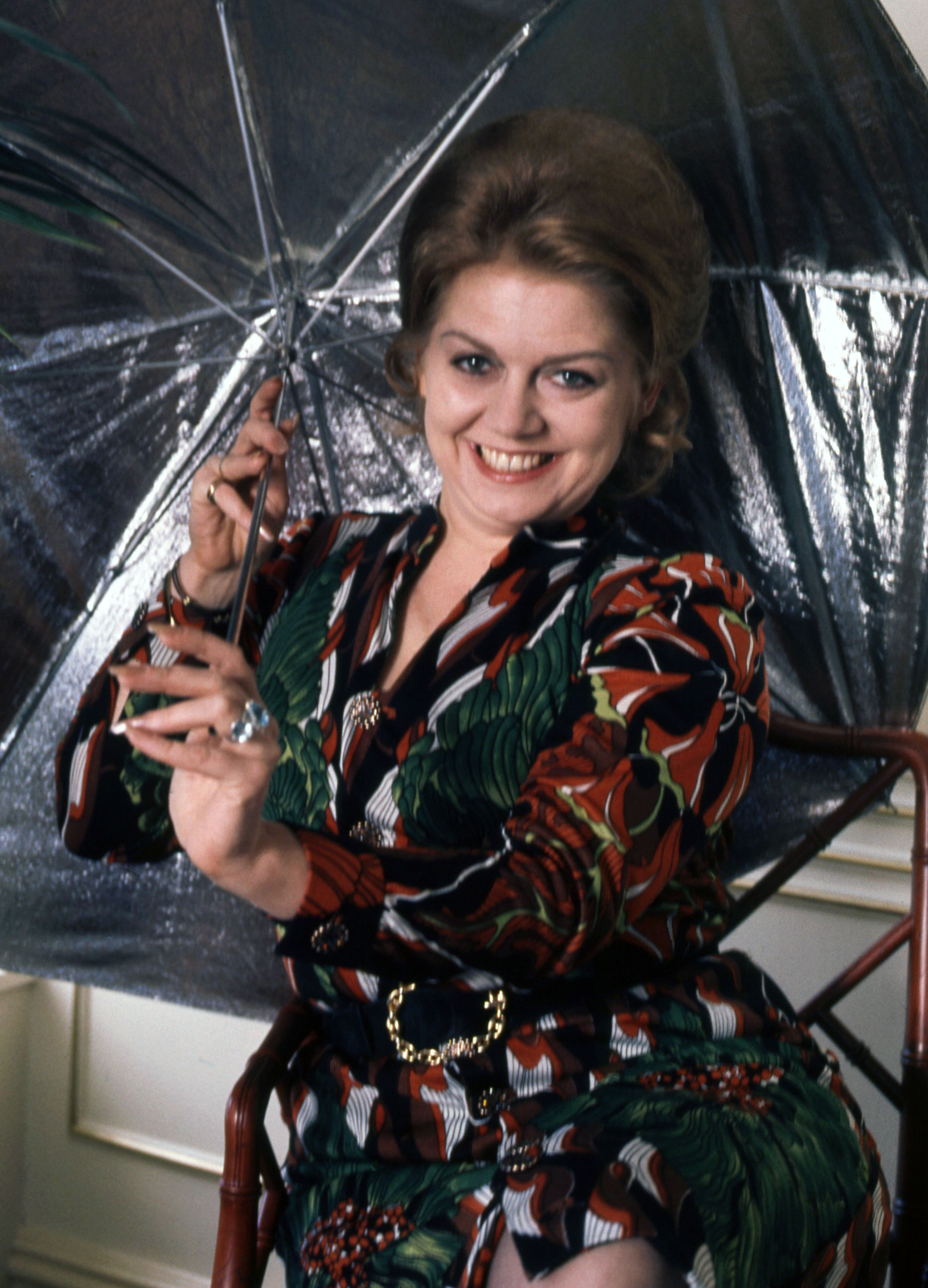
Portrait by Allan Warren

Elena Souliotis (spelled Suliotis in the early part of her career; Greek: Έλενα Σουλιώτη; 28 May 1943 – 4 December 2004) was a Greek operatic soprano.

== Biography ==
Elena Souliotis was born in Athens, Greece, of Greek and Russian parents but moved with her family to Argentina at an early age. She studied with Mercedes Llopart, who also taught Renata Scotto, Anna Moffo, Fiorenza Cossotto, Ivo Vinco and Alfredo Kraus Trujillo. She made her debut in 1964 as Santuzza in Mascagni's Cavalleria rusticana in Naples. She made her United States debut at the Lyric Opera of Chicago during the 1965-66 season as Elena in Boito's Mefistofele; her colleagues in that performance were Renata Tebaldi, Alfredo Kraus and Nicolai Ghiaurov. Other roles that she went on to sing soon afterwards were Luisa Miller, Amelia in Un ballo in maschera and the title role of La Gioconda. A partial list of other operas in which she sang during the first part of her career (1964–1974) include Verdi's Aida and La forza del destino, Donizetti's Anna Bolena, Puccini's Manon Lescaut, Catalani's Loreley, Bellini's La straniera, Zandonai's Francesca da Rimini, and Susanna in Mussorgsky's Khovanshchina. She gave a recital at Carnegie Hall in 1976 and disappeared from the scene shortly after that.

The role for which she is best known is Abigaille in Verdi's opera Nabucco. She made a recording of this role for Decca/London in 1965 (opposite Tito Gobbi, and conducted by Lamberto Gardelli), and gave a performance of the role on opening night of La Scala's 1966-67 season. Within the next couple of years, she also recorded Santuzza (with Mario del Monaco and Gobbi, 1966) and the title role in Norma (with del Monaco, 1967), the latter in an abridged recording that was much maligned when it was initially released.

In 1968-69, she recorded Donizetti's Anna Bolena (with Marilyn Horne), a role she had sung at Carnegie Hall to open its 1967-68 season (with Plácido Domingo, Horne, and Dame Janet Baker), and, in 1970, Verdi's Macbeth (opposite Dietrich Fischer-Dieskau, Nicolai Ghiaurov, and Luciano Pavarotti, conducted by Gardelli). In 1970, she had changed the spelling of her name from Suliotis to Souliotis. She also recorded arias from Un ballo in maschera, La Gioconda, Luisa Miller, Anna Bolena and Macbeth (the last two before she had recorded the complete operas).

She made her London debut on 3 November 1968, when she sang Abigaille in a concert performance of Nabucco at the Theatre Royal, Drury Lane, an event mounted by the London Opera Society. The cast also included Piero Cappuccilli and Boris Christoff, and the conductor was Mario Gusella. In June 1969, she made her debut at the Royal Opera House, Covent Garden, singing Lady Macbeth for the first time.

Souliotis was scheduled to make her Metropolitan Opera debut as Lady Macbeth during the 1969-70 season. However, due to a strike, the first few months of the season were canceled. Souliotis never sang at the Met.

The received opinion is that Souliotis's early assumption of difficult roles damaged her voice. After an absence from the stage that lasted several years, she began a second career in secondary roles, beginning in 1979. She sang Fata Morgana in Sergei Prokofiev's The Love for Three Oranges in Chicago and Florence, and went on to sing in such operas as Prokofiev's The Gambler and Puccini's Suor Angelica, in the latter as the Zia Principessa. Her recording of this latter role, in 1991, opposite Mirella Freni, was her final studio recording. Toward the end of her career, she sang the role of the Comtesse in Tchaikovsky's The Queen of Spades in several venues, and gave her farewell to the operatic stage in this role in Stuttgart in February 2000.

Elena Souliotis died of heart failure in 2004 in Florence, Italy, aged 61.
