= Zaira (opera) =

Opera by Vincenzo Bellini

- Opera by Vincenzo Bellini
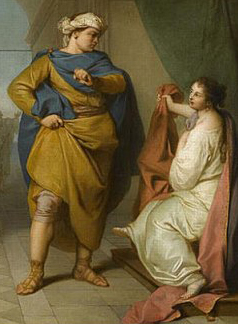
- Orosmane and Zaïre in an 1832 production of Voltaire's stage play
- Librettist: Felice Romani
- Language: Italian
- Based on: Voltaire's play Zaïre
- Premiere: 16 May 1829; Nuovo Teatro Ducale, Parma, now the Teatro Regio di Parma

Zaira is a tragedia lirica, or tragic opera in two acts by Vincenzo Bellini set to a libretto by Felice Romani which was based on Voltaire's 1732 play, Zaïre. The story takes place in the time of the Crusades and the opera's plot involves the heroine, Zaira, struggling between her Christian faith and her love for Orosmane, the Muslim Sultan of Jerusalem.

It was Bellini's fifth opera, following quickly after his February 1829 composition and premiere of La straniera at La Scala.

Zaira received its first performance at the "Nuovo Teatro Ducale" in Parma (now the Teatro Regio di Parma) on 16 May 1829. Although it had been expressly written for the theatre's inauguration, it was a failure at its premiere.

== Composition history ==
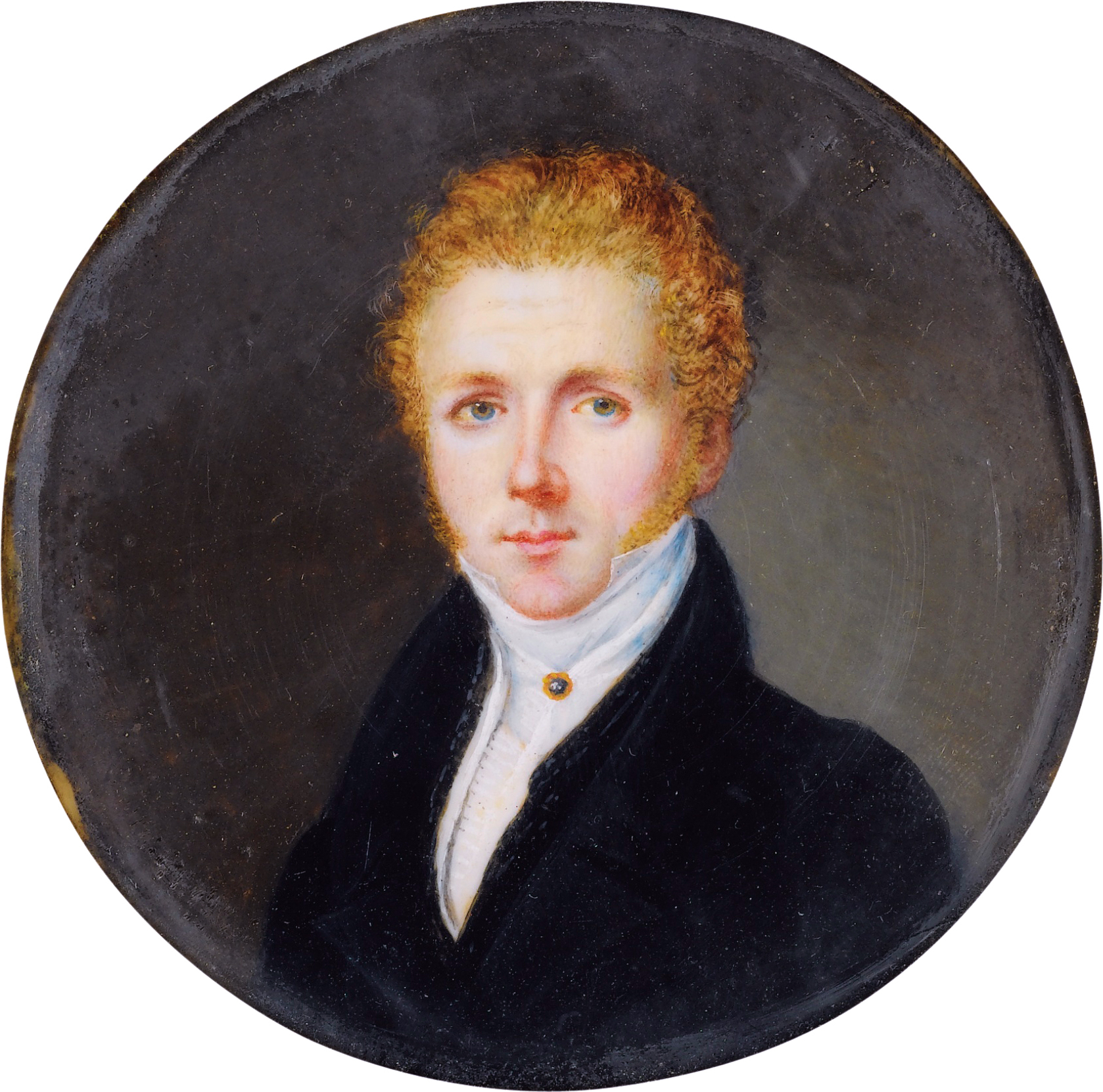
Bellini around 1830

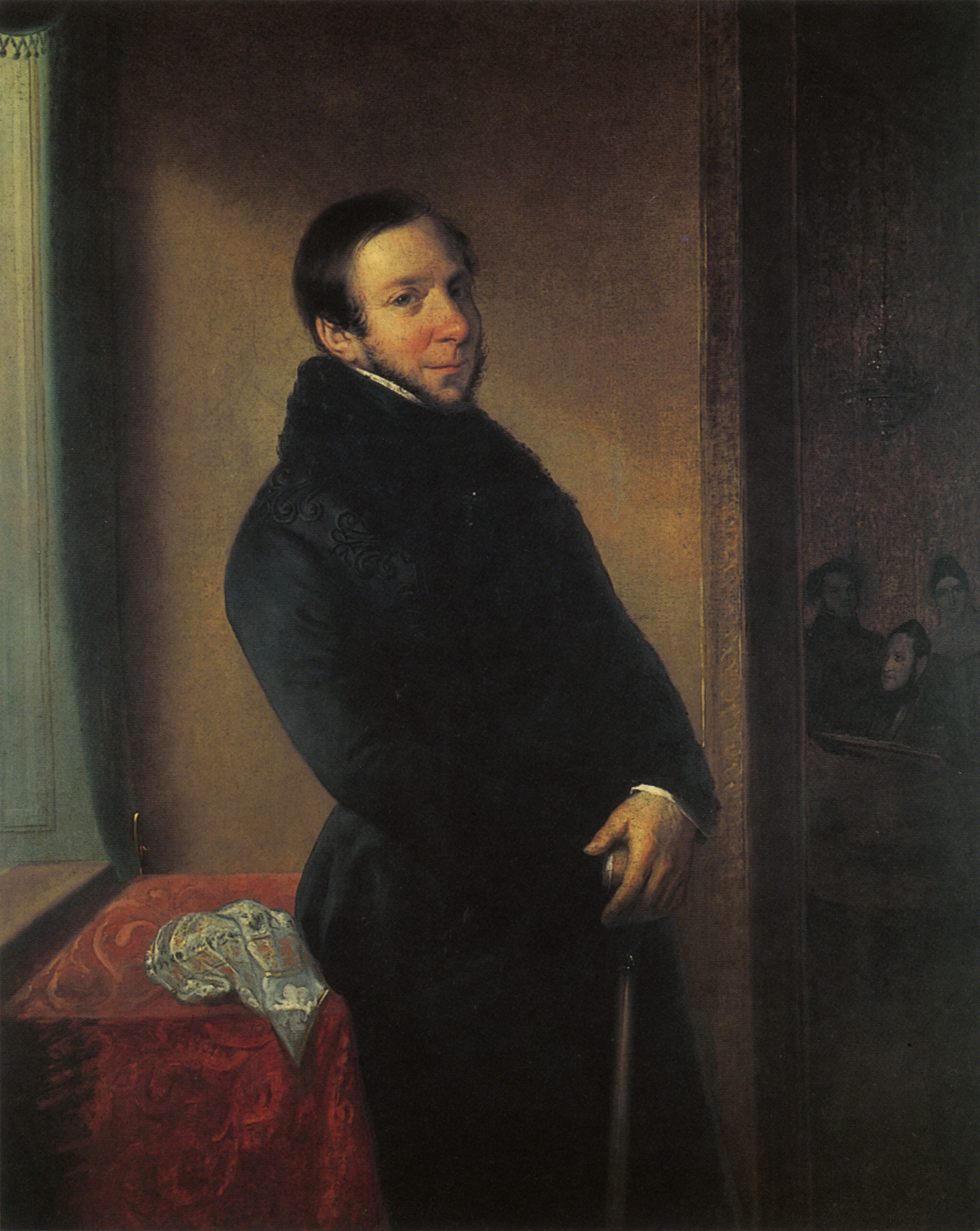
Domenico Barbaja in Naples in the 1820s

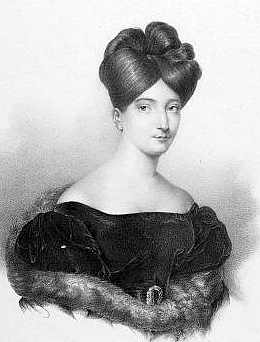
Soprano Henriette Méric-Lalande sang Zaira

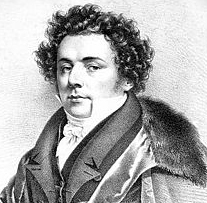
Bass Luigi Lablache sang Orosmane

At around the time that Bellini was in discussions with impresario Domenico Barbaja about a second opera for La Scala to follow La straniera, the composer reported to his friend Francesco Florimo in Naples that he had been approached in August 1828 by another impresario, Bartolomeo Merelli, about writing the inaugural opera for the soon-to-be completed Teatro Ducale (now the Teatro Regio) in Parma which was due to open the following year on 12 May 1829.

The offer to write the opera to inaugurate the house had originally been extended to Rossini, but he had declined due to his work on Le comte Ory for Paris and, while other composers were considered, in November 1828 the offer was made to Bellini, with the subject to be Cesare in Egitto, to be set to a libretto written by a Parma lawyer, Luigi Torrigiani. However, Bellini made it a condition of his contract that he must approve the subject and, over the Parma lawyer's objections and his attempt to persuade him and Henriette Méric-Lalande, the chosen prima donna, to accept this work, Bellini stated a preference for working again with Romani, who himself proposed two subjects.

In a long complaint, which Torrigiani laid against Bellini after he had traveled to Milan to meet the composer and prima donna in an attempt to convince them to use his libretto, he reported to Parma's Grand Chamberlain upon his return in December. The aggrieved librettist sums up Bellini's tastes in Romantic drama as follows:

[He] likes Romanticism and exaggeration. He declares that Classicism is cold and boring ... He is entranced by unnatural meetings in forests, among graves, tombs and the like...

However, the complaint was ignored.

Initially, Romani proposed that the opera should be Carlo di Borgogna, but composer and librettist eventually decided to tackle "a drama so...hallowed as Voltaire's Zaïre". However, this enterprise proved to be more challenging for Romani than first imagined. He explained that, in writing the libretto for Zaira, his position in relation to Voltaire's tragedy was rather different from the tone of the original play, thus avoiding—as Galatopoulos notes—"philosophical ostentation (appropriate in Voltaire and popular at the time)" and noting in the preface to the libretto:

Zaira therefore is not covered with the ample cloak of Tragedy but wrapped in the tight form of Melodrama.

Librettist and composer arrived in Parma on 17 March 1829 giving them 56 days before the opening, but Bellini then learned that some of the singers would only arrive 14 days before the date of the premiere, a date that was—in theory—unchangeable. In fact, that date had to be changed due to the inability of Lalande to arrive in time for sufficient rehearsal.

The later opposition, which arose after the first performance, focused on criticism that Bellini was seen too often on the streets before the premiere rather than writing the music for the opera. This may have had some merit since both composer and librettist were somewhat dilatory, delaying work as much and as long as possible in order to be able to work with the singers and to set the music to suit their vocal characteristics, a not uncommon 19th century practice. Indendant Count Sanvitale's request on 17 April, asking "to let me know the reasons why our copyists are kept idle", did not receive much of response to satisfy the theatre's management, but eventually, both men got down to work and finished on time, although the premiere was delayed by four days due to Lalande's late arrival.

== Performance history ==
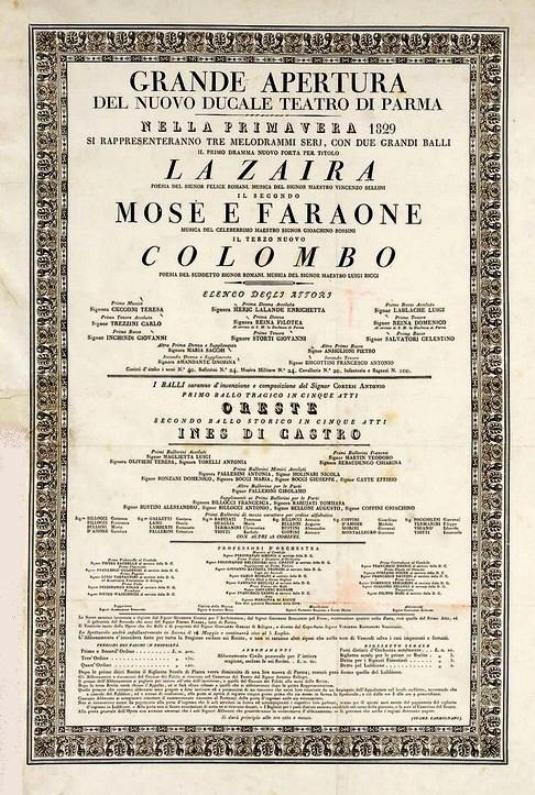
Poster for the opening night of the Nuovo

=== 19th century ===
With this opera, Bellini encountered "the first serious setback of a hitherto brilliant career". Several reasons have been put forward: Lippmann and McGuire note, it was because "Bellini showed too little enthusiasm for the undertaking". Another writer attributes it to Parma's traditional love of and favouritism towards the music of Rossini, while yet another notes that a combination of the composer being constantly seen in cafes around the city (when it was assumed that he should have been composing) and the fact that Romani had included a long explanation of the difficulties of adapting Voltaire in the printed libretto provided to all operagoers. Critical of his own work, the librettist stated: "the style should have been more careful, and that here and there, certain repetitions of phrases and concepts should have been edited out". At the same time, he noted that, with music composed to those verses now in place, "I was not permitted to go back over what already had been done; and poetry and music were finished in less than a month". This short period of time, which was not unusual for some composers in 19th century Italy, compares to the months which it took Bellini to write Il pirata and his preference, as he wrote his later operas, for having a lengthy time frame in which to work.

The general impression given by reports in the press was that, overall, the music was weak, although some numbers and the trio were liked. However, for the most part, the singers were applauded, even if the composer received little.

The opera received eight performances, followed by some poorly-received ones in Florence in 1836, where the reviewer of the Gazzetta di Firenze notes that "Zaira put in an appearance on stage, but that audience....shouted at her, and she returned to the harem" and then it disappeared until 1976. Bellini later re-used substantial parts of the music of Zaira for his next opera I Capuleti e i Montecchi, which received its premiere in March 1830. Except for the Florence revival of Zaira, no performances of it were given for 140 years.

=== 20th century and beyond ===
However, Zaira was revived on 1 April 1976 in a reconstruction by Rubino Profeta at the Teatro Massimo Bellini in Catania with a cast including Renata Scotto and Giorgio Lamberti. and again in September 1990 with Katia Ricciarelli and Ramón Vargas. Both productions were recorded.

There were presentations in 2006 at the Musiktheater im Revier in Gelsenkirchen, Germany, and as a concert performance at the 2009 Festival de Radio France et Montpellier in France. Also, it was staged in Martina Franca, Italy in 2013 at the Festival della Valle d'Itria.

== Roles ==
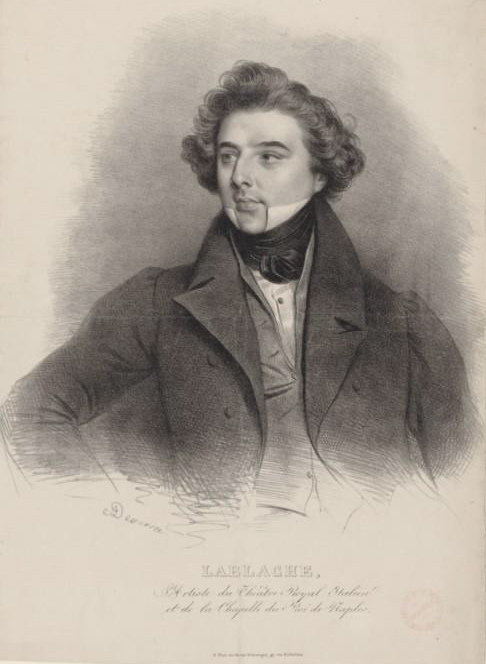
Luigi Lablache in 1840

Roles, voice types, premiere cast
Role	Voice type	Premiere cast, 16 May 1829 Conductor: Ferdinando Melchiorri
Zaira, favourite of Orosmane	soprano	Henriette Méric-Lalande
Orosmane, Sultan of Jerusalem	bass	Luigi Lablache
Nerestano, brother of Zaira	mezzo-soprano	Teresa Cecconi
Corasmino, vizir	tenor	Carlo Trezzini
Lusignano, father of Zaira and Nerestano	bass	Giovanni Inchindi
Castiglione	tenor	Francesco Antonio Biscottini
Fatima	soprano	Marietta Sacchi
Meledor	bass	Pietro Ansiglioni

== Synopsis ==
Place: Jerusalem
Time: 14th/15th century

=== Act 1 ===
Scene 1: A gallery leading to the Sultan's harem

There is celebration in the Sultan's court over the impending marriage between Sultan Orosmane and Zaira, the orphaned Christian slave girl. But some of his courtiers resent the marriage, seeing the installation of a Christian woman as sacrilegious. Corasmino, the Sultan's vizier vows to seek a way that this will not happen.

Zaira herself is happy, but is reminded by Fatima, another slave girl, that she will have to give up her religion upon marriage, and this causes Zaira to declare that from then on, her religion will be that of love. When the Sultan appears, each expresses their mutual love.

The Frenchman Nerestano, a former slave, has returned from France to plead for the release of ten French knights still held captive. Orosmane quickly agrees to release all the captives, who number around one hundred, but insists on retaining Prince Lusignano whom he has condemned to death. Zaira pleads for Lusignano to be released from his death sentence.

Scene 2: A subterranean prison leading to the prisoners' cells

Nerestano and Zaira go down to the prisoners' cells to see the French knights who are to be freed. There they see Prince Lusignano who, upon seeing the couple, actually recognises them as his long-lost children who were taken prisoner during the time he was battling with Syria. Zaira is disturbed by Lusignano's concern that she must renounce her religion and, although called away, pledges to do what she can to avoid taking that action.

Scene 3: The Sultan's harem

The French prisoners are ordered to leave in spite of Corasmino's concern that their poor physical condition might not be well received when they arrive in France. Orosmane allows Zaira to say farewell to Nerestano, but he is upset because he misconstrues the relationship between the two, especially when Zaira asks for a short postponement of the marriage. Orosmane declares that he will kill any man who would be his rival in love.

=== Act 2 ===
Scene 1: Zaira's quarters

Fatima tries to persuade Zaira not to marry Orosmane and not to give up her religion. Zaira pleads for the postponement of her wedding when the sultan enters; at that time, she promises to tell him why. Generously, he agrees.

Scene 2: Near the French knights' cells

Count Lusignano has just died and the sultan allows the French knights to bury him with full Christian honours and then the knights are to be escorted to their ships. However, all are unhappy when they learn that Zaira cannot attend the funeral, since they had planned to abduct her at that time.

Scene 3: The harem

Corasmino has found what he believes to be evidence of Zaira's treachery in appearing to love Nerestano. It has reached him through the interception of a letter from brother to sister demanding that she meet him in the garden that night or he states that he will kill himself. He shares this information with Orosmane who agrees that the message should get through to her.

Conflicting emotions overwhelm Zaira when she reads the letter. At that moment, she hears the sounds of a funeral and, looking from the balcony and realising that it is her father who is dead, collapses in a faint, an action which amazes the other slaves and guards.

Scene 4: The harem gardens at night

Humiliated, Orosmane hides in the garden along with Corasmino. They await Zaira's arrival. When she does so, accompanied by Fatima, Nerestano appears and, to him, she renounces her love for Orosmane and expresses her desire to return with him to her homeland. In a fit of jealousy, the sultan rushes at Zaira and fatally stabs her. Dying, she explains her relationship to Nerestano at which the grieving Orosmane, ordering all to leave, stabs himself in the heart.

== Recordings ==
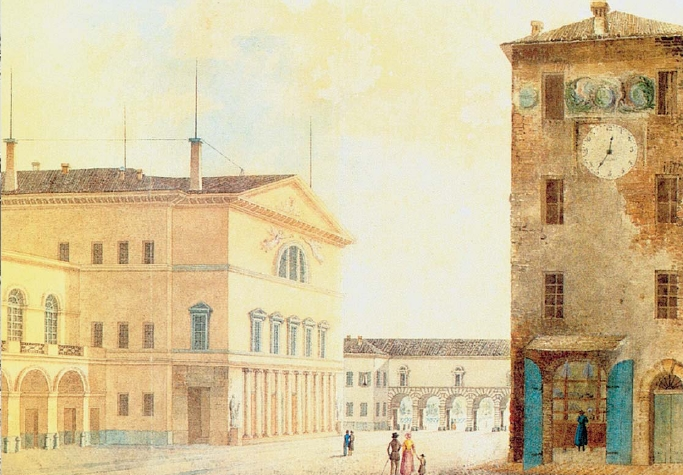
Nuovo Teatro Ducale in 1829

Year	Cast: (Zaira, Orosmane, Corasmino, Nerestano, Lusignano)	Conductor, Opera house and orchestra	Label
1976	Renata Scotto, Luigi Roni, Giorgio Lamberti, Maria Luisa (Bordin) Nave, Mario Rinaudo	Danilo Belardinelli; Orchestra and Chorus of Teatro Massimo Bellini (Recording of a performance at Catania, 30 March and 1 April)	CD: Opera d'Oro; Cat: OPD 1442
1990	Katia Ricciarelli, Simone Alaimo, Ramón Vargas, Alexandra Papadjakou, Luigi Roni	Paolo Olmi; Orchestra and Chorus of Teatro Massimo Bellini (Recorded at performances in Catania, 23, 25, 27 September)	CD: Nuova Era; Cat: 6982/83
2009	Ermonela Jaho, Wenwei Zhang, Shalva Mukeria, Varduhl Abrahamyan, Carlo Kang	Enrique Mazzola, Orchestre National de Montpellier Languedoc-Roussillon and the Latvian Radio and Television Choir (Recording of a concert performance in the Opera Berlioz – Le Corum, Montpellier, 13 July)	CD: The Opera Lovers, Cat: ZAI 200901
2016	Saioa Hernández, Simone Alberghini, Enea Scala, Anna Malavasi, Abramo Rosalen	Giacomo Sagripanti; Orchestra Internazionale d'Italia, Coro Lirico Terre Verdiane (Recording of a performance at the Palazzo Ducale, Martina Franca, July 2012	CD:Bongiovanni, Cat:GB2565/66
