= Mercedes Llopart =

Spanish soprano

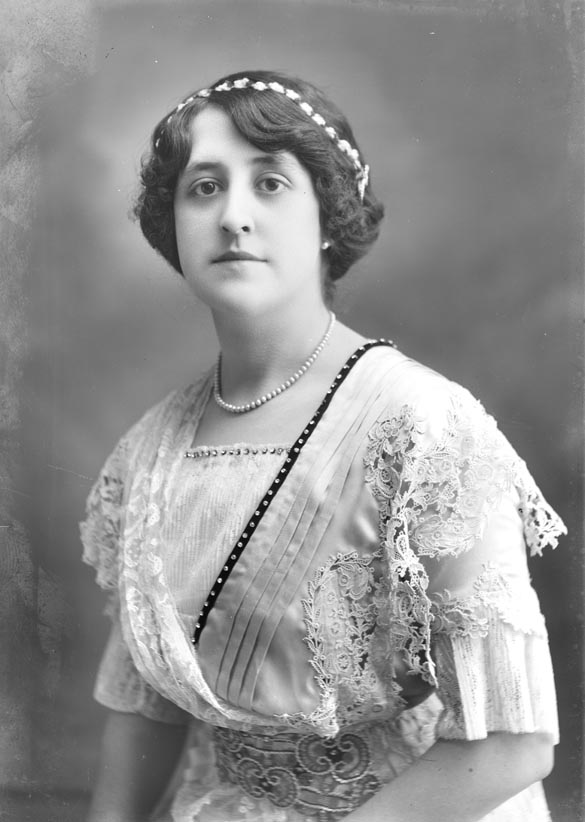
Mercè Llopart (fotografia d'Antoni Esplugas).jpeg

Mercedes Llopart (1895 – 2 September 1970) was a Spanish soprano who later became a notable singing teacher in Italy.

Mercedes Llopart studied in her native Barcelona and made her operatic debut there in 1915. She then went to Italy where she sang in many small theatres before making her debut at the Rome Opera in 1920 where she remained until 1925. She then appeared at the Verona Arena in 1922 as Elsa in Lohengrin, in Palermo in 1923 in the title-role of Tosca, in Genoa in 1925 as Ginevra in La cena delle beffe. In 1924, at the invitation of maestro Arturo Toscanini, she made her debut at the Teatro alla Scala in Milan, as Sieglinde in Die Walkure, and went on singing there as Alice Ford in Falstaff, the Marschallin in Der Rosenkavalier, the Countess in Le nozze di Figaro, and created the role of Dolly at the world premiere of Wolf-Ferrari's opera Sly in 1927, with the great Italian tenor Aureliano Pertile. She also appeared at the Royal Opera House in London as Alice Ford in 1926, and as Tosca at the Monte Carlo Opera in 1929.

She retired from the stage in 1945 and became a noted singing teacher in Milan, her most famous students include: Renata Scotto, Fiorenza Cossotto, Anna Moffo, Elena Souliotis, Biancamaria Casoni, Venezuelan tenor Rubén Dominguez, Venezuelan coloratura soprano Cecilia Nuñez Albanese, Ana María Iriarte, Francisco Ortiz, tenors Bernabé Martí, Alfredo Kraus, his older brother baritone Francisco Kraus and bass Ivo Vinco. She died in Milan.

== Sources ==
- Mercedes Llopart at Operissimo.com
