= La straniera =

Opera by Vincenzo Bellini

- Opera by Vincenzo Bellini
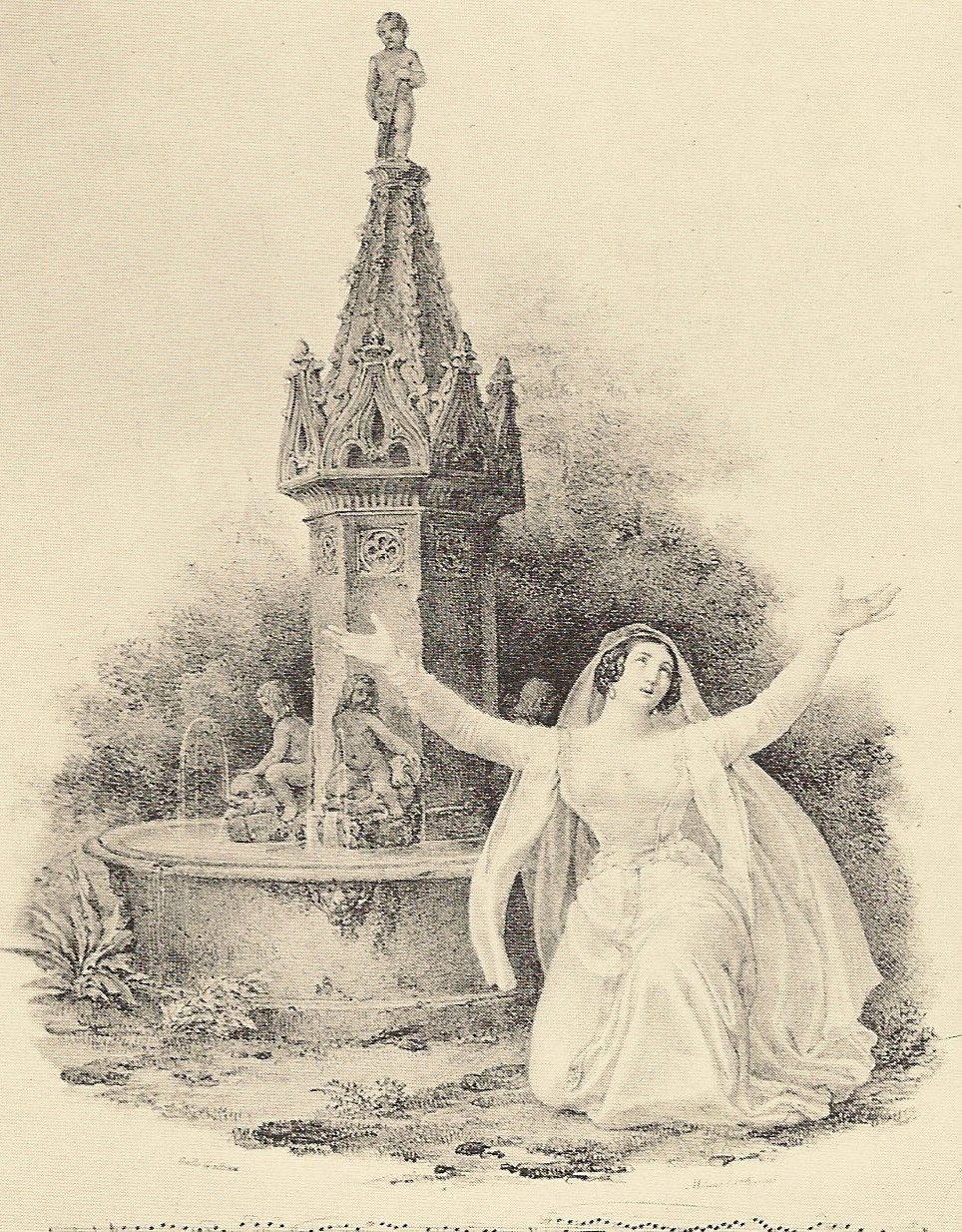
- Henriette Meric-Lalande as Alaide in the original 1829 production
- Librettist: Felice Romani
- Language: Italian
- Based on: Charles-Victor Prévot, vicomte d'Arlincourt's novel L'Étrangère
- Premiere: 14 February 1829; Teatro alla Scala, Milan

La straniera (The Foreign Woman) is an opera in two acts with music by Vincenzo Bellini to an Italian libretto by Felice Romani, based on the novel L'Étrangère (2 vols, 1825) by Charles-Victor Prévot, vicomte d'Arlincourt, although writer Herbert Weinstock also adds that it is "more likely [based on] a dramatization of [that novel] in Italian by Giovan Carlo, barone di Cosenza" since he then quotes a letter from Bellini to his friend Francesco Florimo in which he says that Romani "certainly will not follow the play" [suggesting then that they were aware of its existence.]

The opera was composed in the autumn of 1828 and premiered on 14 February 1829 at the Teatro alla Scala in Milan.

== Composition history ==
Historical background

At the heart of the plot of this opera is a complicated series of historical events beginning at the end of the twelfth century. King Philip Augustus of France (Philip II of France) married the Danish princess Ingeborg in 1193. For unknown reasons, he separated from her the day after the wedding and sought an annulment from Pope Celestine III. Ingeborg, however, insisted that the marriage had been consummated, and that she was his wife and the rightful Queen of France. Philip ultimately obtained an annulment through an assembly of French bishops. He then sought to marry Marguerite, daughter of William I, Count of Geneva, but she was kidnapped on the way to Paris by Thomas I of Savoy, who married her instead. Ultimately, in 1196 Philip married Agnes of Merania ("la straniera"), the daughter of a nobleman, Bertold IV of Dalmatia. Denmark continued to complain about Philip's treatment of Ingeborg and in 1200 Pope Innocent III required Philip to take her back, rendering him essentially a bigamist and subject to excommunication. Agnes died in 1201, however, ending the threat of excommunication.

Adjustments to the story in order to create the libretto

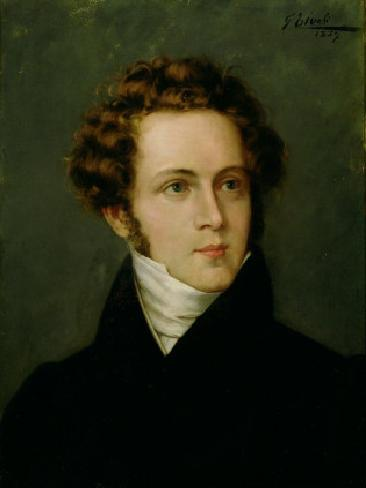
Bellini in 1830 by Natale Schiavoni

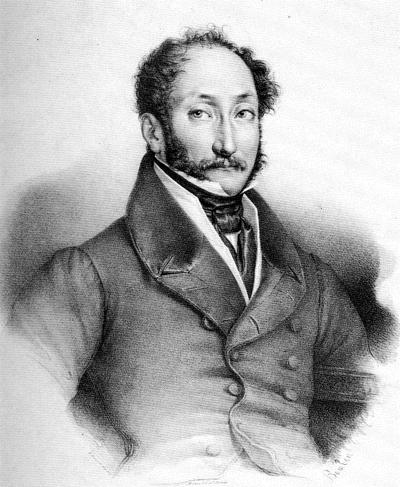
Librettist Felice Romani

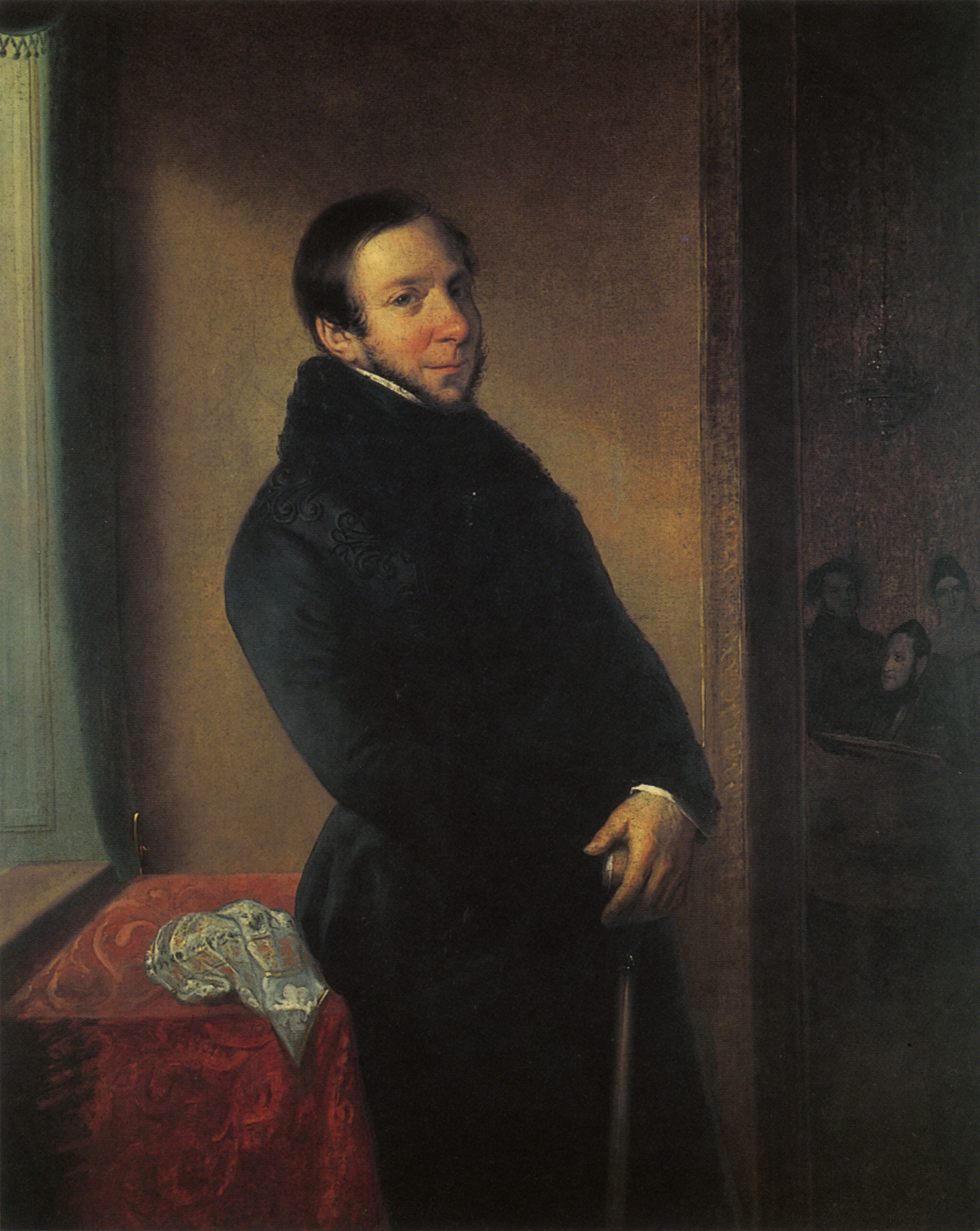
Domenico Barbaja, Naples in the 1820s

Bellini and his librettist Romani took tremendous liberties with this already unusual story and devised a plot where the King, in order to resolve the problem of his double marriage, sends Agnes to live at a cottage on Lake Montolino. Philip then sends her brother to secretly watch over her, while masquerading under the name Valdeburgo. Agnes has assumed the name of Alaide and hides under a veil. Count Arturo has fallen in love with her, in spite of his engagement to Isoletta, daughter of the Duke of Montolino. At this point the opera begins.

Preparing La straniera

After Bianca e Fernando, Bellini remained in Genoa and then returned to Milan, but with no specific opportunities in place. Some complications had emerged in his relationship with Domenico Barbaja, the impresario who controlled both the Naples and the Milan theatres. However, when Barbaja visited Milan in June, he offered Bellini the opportunity to choose between working for either Naples or Milan as the venue for his next opera. For the composer, the decision hung on the availability of singers for each of the houses, especially because Giovanni Battista Rubini, his preferred tenor, was contracted to sing only in Naples. However, by 16 June, he had decided on the location to be Milan, and then signed a contract to write a new opera for the Carnival season for a fee of one thousand ducati. This compared to 150 ducati for his first opera.

Therefore, for La straniera, Bellini received a fee which was sufficient for him to be able to make his living solely by composing music, and this new work became an even greater success than Il pirata had been. As for singers, it appears there was some doubt about the tenor, but that the soprano, Henriette Méric-Lalande and, for the baritone role, Luigi Lablache or Tamburini, would be available.

In consultation with Romani as to the subject, it was agreed that it would be based on the novel L'Étrangère of 1825 by Charles-Victor Prévot, vicomte d'Arlincourt, and planned for the premiere on the opening night of the season on 26 December. In the 1820s, the popularity of this author, upon whom was bestowed the epithet "the prince of the romantics", rivalled that of Victor Hugo. Prévot's Le Solitaire appeared in 1821 and achieved an "extraordinary, even colossal, celebrity." In the space of several months, the book was reprinted a dozen times; it was translated into ten languages; there were no fewer than seven operas based on its story, and twice as many dramatic adaptations; and it was the subject of innumerable songs, parodies, paintings and lithographs. The success of his next three novels, Le Renégat in 1822, Ipsiboé in 1823, and L'Étrangère in 1825, was almost as great.

However, by 20 September, Bellini told his Neapolitan friend Francesco Florimo that he did not think the performance could take place as scheduled due to Romani being ill. In addition, he was concerned about who would sing the tenor role when he had been unable to obtain Rubini's release from his Naples contract. Fortunately, having received good reports of the young tenor Domenico Reina, he was able to secure his services, describing him in a letter to Florimo as "one who will want to do himself honour; everyone tells me that his voice is beautiful, and that he has all the acting and spirit one could wish for."

Following Romani's recovery, the libretto was delivered piecemeal, but Bellini set to work again, albeit that progress was slow. By 7 January 1829, with Romani having recovered and set off for Venice to fulfill another contract, the composer was "almost up to the 2nd act". Filippo Cicconetti, in his 1859 biography, gives an account of Bellini's working methods, explaining how he set texts to music always with the words in front of him in order to see how inspired to compose he might become. When it came time to compose the final aria Or sei pago, o ciel tremendo, the librettist's words gave him no inspiration at all and, at their next meeting, Romani agreed to re-write the text. Returning within half an hour, the second version left Bellini equally cold—as did a third draft. Finally, when asked what it was that he was seeking, Bellini replied: "I want a thought that will be at one and the same time a prayer, an imprecation, a warning, a delirium....". A fourth draft was quickly prepared: "Have I entered into your spirit?" asked the librettist—and he was immediately embraced by the young composer who was totally satisfied.

Rehearsals began in early January with the premiere planned for 14 February 1829.

== Performance history ==
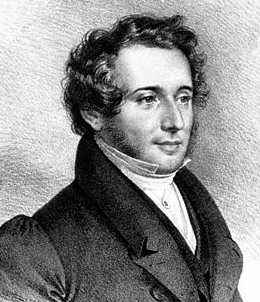
Baritone Antonio Tamburini, sang Valdeburgo

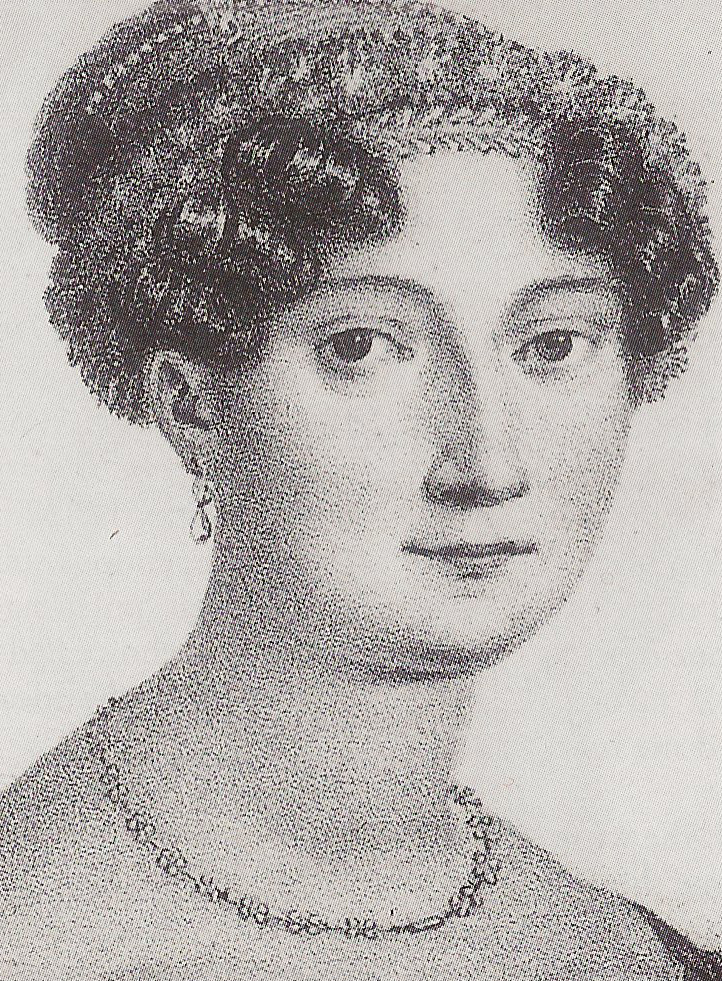
Soprano Henriette Méric-Lalande, sang Alaide

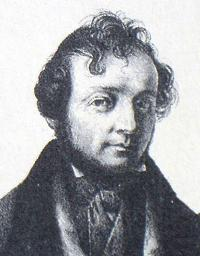
Tenor Domenico Reina, sang Arturo

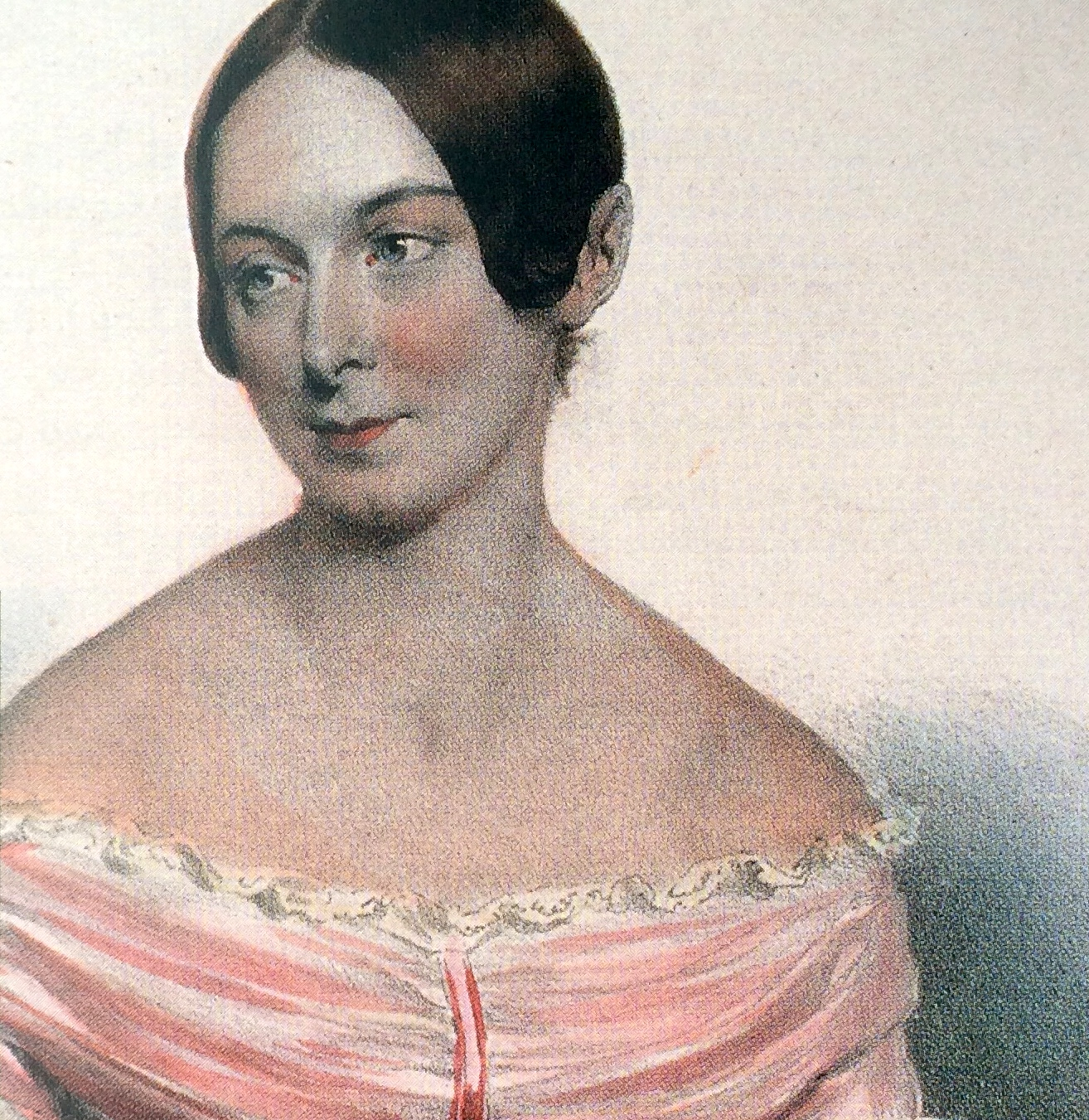
Mezzo Caroline Unger, sang Isoletta

The premiere

The opera was an immediate success and, in the words of the writer for the Gazzetta privilegiata di Milano,

a clamorous success...[with] the poet [serving] the composer well, and the composer could not have served the singers better; all competed to render themselves pleasing to the public, and succeeded in such a way as to be applauded greatly.

Three days later, the same publication praised the quality of the music, describing Bellini as "a modern Orpheus" for the beauty of his melodies.

Reporting to Romani, who was still in Venice, Bellini gave an account of the success: "The thing went as we never had imagined it. We were in seventh heaven. With [this letter] receive my gratitude more than ever...."

Others wrote equally enthusiastic reports, with abundant praise being given to the singers as well. However, there were detractors who criticised both the opera and its composer: its new style and its restless harmonic shifts into remote keys did not please all. 45 years later it was stated that "Bellini's style was abstruse, discontinuous, distorted, and lacking in distinction, that it alternated between the serio and the buffo and the semi-serio."

19th century performances

The opera was first performed at La Scala, Milan on 14 February 1829, with Henriette Méric-Lalande and Domenico Reina in the leading roles. Alessandro Sanquirico, the well-established set designer of the time, designed the sets, and the opera was presented on a triple bill, along with the ballets Buondelmonte and L'avviso ai maritati.

Within Italy it received performances in over 50 cities until Turin in 1866: these included a revival at Milan's La Scala plus a performance in Bologna in 1836 with Carolina Ungher, in Florence and Regio di Calabria in 1840, Brescia in August 1850, Milan again in 1857, and then in Turin in 1866. As noted by Tom Kaufman, its last-known presentation in the 19th century was in Catania in 1875 with Ana Eyre as Alaide.

Abroad, it was first presented in Vienna in 1831, in Paris in 1832, in London on 23 June 1832, in New York on 10 November 1834, in Lisbon in 1835, and in Madrid as La estranjera in January 1850.

20th century and beyond

Following its last-known performance in 1875, the opera was first revived in April 1935 at La Scala with other revivals beginning in 1954 in Bellini's hometown of Catania. It was staged again between 1968 (at the Teatro Massimo in Palermo) up to 1972 with Renata Scotto in the title role.

Since the 1970s the opera has made several appearances within Europe with Scotto again performing in Venice in 1970 under conductor Ettore Gracis, while in 1969 a concert performance at Carnegie Hall featured Montserrat Caballé under the baton of Anton Guadagno. Recordings exist of all three of these performances. Another production in Catania, with Elena Souliotis in the major role, was given at the Teatro Massimo in 1971.

A recording exists of a concert performance in the Cour Jacques Coeur in Montpellier in August 1989. There was also a performance that year as part of the Spoleto Festival USA given in the Gaillard Auditorium, Charleston, USA on 26 May with Carol Neblett in the major role.

In December 1990, the Teatro Verdi di Trieste presented the opera and that was followed in 1993 with another concert performance at Carnegie Hall, starring Renée Fleming in one of her very early roles, presented by the Opera Orchestra of New York.

A complete concert performance was given in November 2007 in London, with Patrizia Ciofi as Alaide, Dario Schmunck as Arturo, and Mark Stone as (Valdeburgo) in the principal roles, conducted by David Parry with the London Philharmonic Orchestra and a complete studio recording was made with this cast the same week.

Only occasional modern-day performances continue to be given. In November 2012, the opera was presented in concert in Baden-Baden with Edita Gruberova as Alaide and José Bros as Arturo di Raventel. The Zurich Opera presented the opera in June/July and again in September/October 2013. The Alaide for these performances was Gruberova, with staging by Christoph Loy.

Concert performances were given in Marseilles in late October/November 2013 with Patrizia Ciofi as Alaide. The Theater an der Wien in Vienna presented it from 14 January 2015 in Loy's production with Gruberova alternating with Marlis Petersen as Alaide. The Washington Concert Opera presented it in November 2017, with Amanda Woodbury as Alaide, Gerard Schneider as Arturo, Javier Arrey as Valdeburgo, and Corrie Stallings as Isoletta.

== Roles ==
Role	Voice type	Premiere cast, 14 February 1829 (Conductor: )
Alaide, the stranger	soprano	Henriette Méric-Lalande
Arturo, Count of Ravenstel	tenor	Domenico Reina
Valdeburgo, Baron, secret brother of Alaide	baritone	Antonio Tamburini
Isoletta, fiancée of Arturo	mezzo-soprano	Caroline Unger
Osburgo, confidant of Arturo	tenor	Luigi Asti
Il signore di Montolino, father of Isoletta	bass	Domenico Spiaggi
Il Priore degli Spedalieri	bass	Stanislao Marcionni

== Synopsis ==
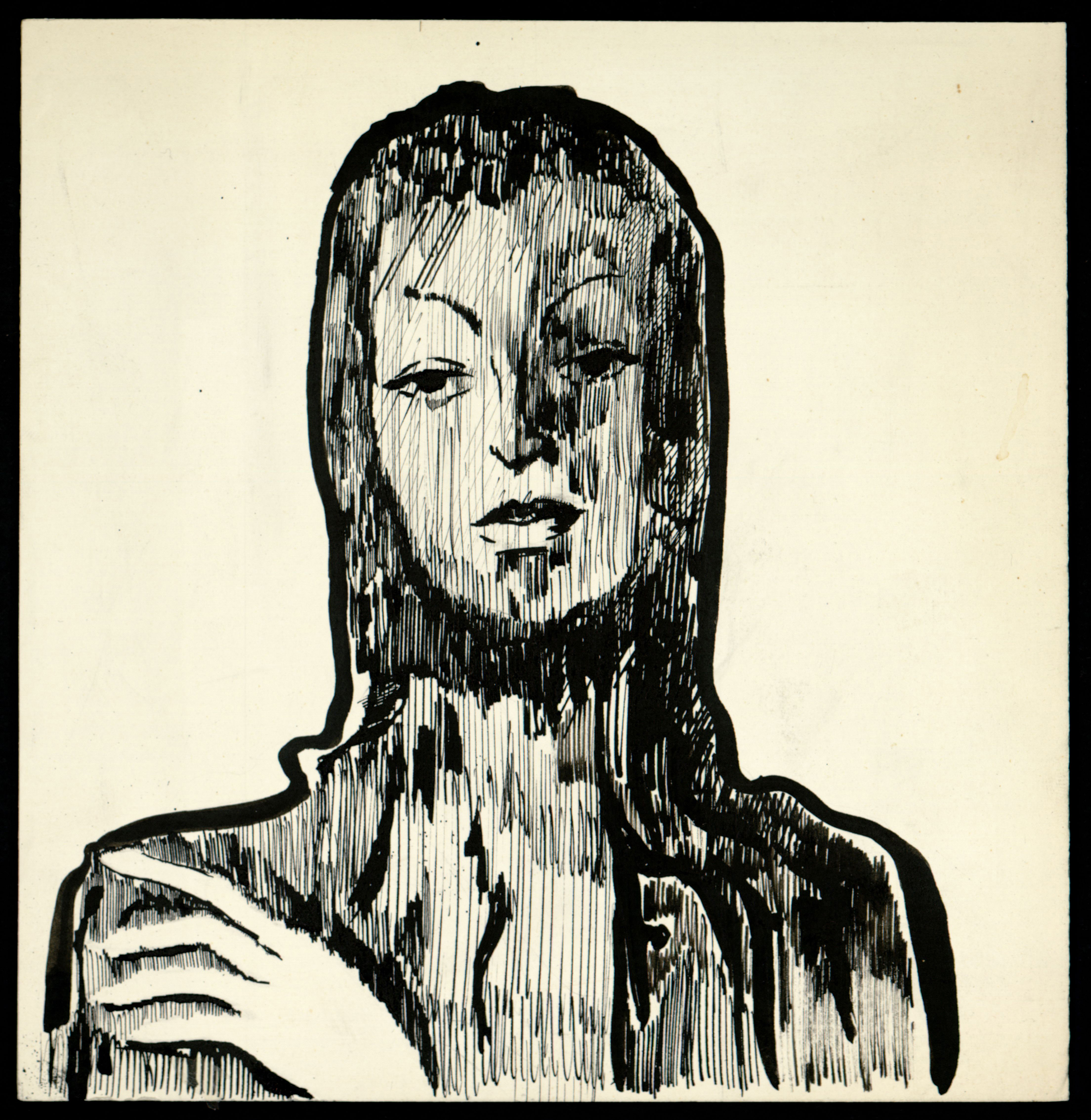
Disegno per copertina di libretto, drawing for La straniera (undated).

Place: Brittany
Time: 14th century

=== Act 1 ===
- Overture

Scene 1: Central courtyard of the Castle of Montolino

A chorus of local people on boats proclaims the upcoming wedding of Isoletta, daughter of Montolino, to Count Arturo of Ravenstal: (Men: Voga, voga, il vento tace........e l'alma pace / Messaggiera dell'amor / "Row, row, the wind has dropped......this blessed peace is the message of love".) But, together on the shore, Isoletta tells Baron Valdeburgo that she fears her Arturo has changed his attitude toward her and believes that he has fallen in love with a mysterious woman living as a hermit in a hut by the lake: (Duet: Isoletta to Valdeburgo: Agli atti, al volto / non mortal, divina imago / "From her gestures, her expression, she did not appear to be mortal, but rather a divine image". Valdeburgo, to himself: Giovin rosa, il vergin seno / schiudi appena al ciel sereno / "A newly bloomed rose has scarce opened / her virgin breast to the serene sky, / and already she wilts in pallor".) In the distance a crowd is heard following "La straniera" who has been seen from the lake shore. They curse her as a witch.

Count Montolino enters, supporting his daughter Isoletta's concerns, but is reassured by his friend Osburgo who promises to bring Arturo to his senses. Together, Isoletta and Valdeburgo share her concern as to what has transpired: (Duet and ensemble: Isoletta, then Valdeburgo, then chorus, as Montolino returns: Oh tu che sai gli spasimi / "Oh you who know the quakings of this wounded heart of mine"). Valdeburgo offers his services as someone from whom she may find comfort, while her father and his retinue urges calm and that she adopt a happier expression. Montolino and Osburgo discuss the situation, the former fearing that Arturo lacks concern for his intended bride while the latter describes Arturo's interest in other hermit-like people as part of his character, but promises to do his best to return Arturo to his intended bride.

Scene 2: La straniera's cabin

Furtively, Arturo enters "The Stranger" Alaide's hut, desiring to know the identity of this mysterious woman. Inside, he sees a portrait of her dressed in royal robes, wearing jewels. He hears a voice in the distance, singing a lament which expresses the joys of solitude and of a lowly life. He realises that it is she and, when she comes into the room, she chastises him for entering her hut. He continues to demand that he is there only to help her and that he loves her, while she keeps pressuring him to leave her in peace expressing the feeling that there is "an insuperable barrier between us".

He persists with his questions, asking if she has been banished long ago and, finally, apologises for his intrusion. In an extended duet, first he, then she, then together proclaims: Serba, serba i tuoi segreti / "Keep, keep your secrets....but it is in vain to forbid me to love you", while she responds with Taci, taci, è l'amor mio / condannato sulla terra / "Hush, hush, my love is condemned upon this earth; I cannot associate you with a destiny that is so hostile towards me". She tells him that she will reveal nothing about her past and begs him never to return. However, as the duet continues, she exclaims: "Ah! would that I could so easily / Erase you from [my heart]", admitting an attraction to Arturo. He says that he will continue to follow her "even into a desert" while she responds: "Your wish will prove your undoing".

Then the sound of huntsmen is heard in the distance. Alaide urgently urges Arturo to leave. In the scene finale duet, the couple each expresses his or her feelings and anxieties, hers being to continue to warn him, his being to insist that "your fate will be mine / In life or in death".

Scene 3: A forest near Montolino

During a hunting expedition, Osburgo and Valdeburgo encounter Arturo, but are aware that Alaide's cabin is close by. Osburgo begs him to return for his wedding to Isoletta, but he refuses, declaring that he does not love her. He asks Valdeburgo to meet his true love, after which he promises that he will never see her again if Valdeburgo judges her unworthy. The pair approach the cabin, from which Alaide emerges. Upon seeing her, Valdeburgo hails her and almost calls out her real name, but Alaide stops him. Valdeburgo tells Arturo that —for reasons he cannot reveal— Arturo must renounce any intentions toward Alaide. She cannot ever marry Arturo. Thinking Valdeburgo is his rival for Alaide's affections, Arturo is about to attack him with his sword, but he declares that he is not a rival. (Trio: first Valdeburgo No: non ti son rivale; / non io ti tolgo a lei / "No: I am not your rival; then Arturo "Ah, if he is not my rival, / What does he wish of me"; then Alaide "No, you have no rival".) Alaide begs Arturo to leave, promising that she will see him again: "Your life, Arturo, matters to me as my own". Both Alaide and Valdeburgo urge Arturo to leave.

Scene 4: A remote place, with Alaide's cabin to be seen in the distance

Arturo is alone, still mistakenly crazy with jealousy directed at Valdeburgo: (Aria: Che mai penso? Un dubbio atroce / Mi rimane e il cor mi preme... / "Whatever am I to think? My heart is heavy / and I am left with an atrocious doubt..."). When Osburgo and his entourage enter, they tell him that he is betrayed because they have overheard Valdeburgo and Alaide planning to flee together.

The couple comes out of the cabin, observed by Arturo, who overhears that they plan to leave together the next day. Arturo concludes that they are lovers, and after Alaide has returned to her cabin, he confronts Valdeburgo furiously and demands revenge. The men fight a duel, Valdeburgo is wounded, and he falls into the lake. Alaide then appears and Arturo declares that he has killed his rival, but Alaide, heavily shocked, reveals that Valdeburgo is actually her brother. Upon hearing that news, Arturo jumps into the lake in an effort to save Valdeburgo. Attracted by the shouting, a crowd finds Alaide standing with Arturo's bloody sword, and they accuse her of murdering Valdeburgo. She is dragged off as a prisoner.

=== Act 2 ===
Scene 1: The great hall of the Tribunal of the Hospitallers

Alaide is brought to trial before the assembled judges, but concealed beneath a heavy veil. Osburgo testifies against her. When asked her name by the presiding Prior, she responds only with La straniera. The Prior feels that he has heard her voice before, and he demands that she prove her innocence. She is reluctant to say much more. Suddenly, Arturo rushes in and proclaims her innocence and confesses his own guilt, stating that he killed someone whom he assumed was a rival. All appears to doom both Alaide and Arturo when, into the chamber Valdeburgo suddenly appears, announcing that Arturo is innocent and that it was in single combat with Arturo that he fell into the lake.

The Prior again demands that Alaide reveal her identity, but she refuses. However, she does agree to lift her veil for the Prior alone and he gasps upon seeing her face. Immediately, he sends her away with Valdeburgo. Arturo is left alone, while the Prior chastises Osburgo for his false testimony against Alaide, stating that his actions will be watched.

Scene 2: In the forest but close to Alaide's cabin

Arturo comes to beg Alaide's forgiveness and confess his love, and, as he is about to enter the cabin, he encounters Valdeburgo, who again pleads with Arturo to desist in his attentions toward his sister, demanding that he draw his sword: (In an extended duet, first Valdeburgo —Si...Sulla salma del fratello / T'apri il passo, a lei t'invia / "Yes, over the corpse of her brother / Clear your way and approach her"—then Arturo—Ah, pietà... non io favello; / È un amore disperato / "Ah! have pity.... It is not I who speaks; / It is a love that is desperate, / It is the grief of a wounded heart".) Arturo continues to describe the "torturing madness of a burning heart" while Valdeburgo explains that, for Alaide's peace of mind, Arturo must leave her in peace and that he should fulfill his promises to Isoletta by marrying her. Reluctantly, Arturo agrees to return to marry Isoletta, but asks that Alaide attend his wedding so he can see her one last time. Valdeburgo agrees.

Scene 3: Isoletta's apartment in the Castle of Montolino

Isoletta, truly unhappy and understandably feeling ignored and unloved, prepares for her wedding. (Aria, Isoletta: Nè alcun ritorna?....Oh crudel. / Dolorosa incertezza / "And not a soul returns? Oh cruel, / Grievous uncertainty! All leave me in / Ignorance of what has happened"). In her grief and misery she speaks to Arturo's portrait until the wedding party joyfully appears proclaiming that Arturo is in the castle and that he wants to marry her that very day.

Scene 4: A courtyard leading to the church

Knight and ladies assemble and Montolino welcomes them, but Arturo is confused, then seeing Valdeburgo, he approaches him. Meanwhile, Alaide has entered and concealed herself. Valdeburgo tells Arturo that Alaide is present, but hidden. (Quartet: Arturo, Isoletta, Valdeburgo, and Alaide, aside). Isoletta greets Arturo who ignores her and remains in an anxious state, to the point where she realises that he does not love her and, essentially, releases him from his obligations. Then Alaide suddenly reveals herself, declaring that she has come to give Isoletta courage. As "La straniera", she begs Isoletta to continue with the wedding, and, taking the prospective bride and groom by the arm, begins to lead them into the church.

She then leaves the church in deep anguish: "I have abandoned, not love, but hope", she cries. (Aria: Ciel pietoso, in sì crudo momento, / Al mio labbro perdona un lamento / "Merciful Heaven, in such a cruel moment, / Forgive my lips if they utter a lament"). Then religious music is heard from within the church with the choir singing blessings to the couple. Alaide's torment continues, until—suddenly—there is silence, followed by chaotic sounds from within.

Arturo burst out from inside the church, takes Alaide's hand, begging her to run off with him as he tries to drag her away. At that moment, the Prior rushes from the church and recognises Alaide as Queen Agnes. He announces that he has just learned that the Queen's rival for the throne, Isemberga, has died and now Alaide must return to Paris. Arturo, rendered mad by this news, throws himself on his sword and dies. Finally, La Straniera/Alaide/Agnes is in total despair. (Aria, then choral finale: Or sei pago, o ciel tremendo... / Or vibrato è il colpo estremo / "Now you are glutted, O fearful Heaven... / Now you have dealt your direst blow...... I ask for death, I await death")

== Recordings ==
Year	Cast: Alaide (La straniera), Il signore di Montolino, Isoletta, Arturo, Valdeburgo	Conductor, Opera House and Orchestra	Label
1968	Renata Scotto, Enrico Campi, Elena Zilio, Renato Cioni, Domenico Trimarchi	Nino Sanzogno, Orchestra and Chorus of the Teatro Massimo, Palermo, (Recording of a performance in the Teatro Massimo, Palermo, 10 December)	CD: Melodram, Cat: 27039; Myto, Cat: 3MCD-971-151 (highlights +Zaira), Myto, Cat: 2 MCD-023-265
1969	Montserrat Caballé, Vincente Sardinero, Amedeo Zambon, Bianca Maria Casoni	Anton Guadadno Orchestra e Coro della Carnegie Hall	Opera d'oro
1970	Renata Scotto, Francesco Signor, Elena Zilio, Beniamino Prior, Domenico Trimarchi	Ettore Gracis; Orchestra and Chorus of the Teatro La Fenice, Venice (Recording of a performance at La Fenice, January)	CD: Opera d'Oro; Cat# OPD 1261
1993	Renée Fleming, Rafael Le Bron, Ning Liang, Gregory Kunde, Gaétan Laperrière	Eve Queler, Opera Orchestra of New York and Chorus, (Recording of a concert performance in the Carnegie Hall, New York, February)	CD: Celestial Audio, Cat: CA 607
2007	Patrizia Ciofi, Roland Wood, Enkelejda Shokas, Dario Schmunck, Mark Stone	David Parry, London Philharmonic Orchestra and Geoffrey Mitchell Choir	CD: Opera Rara, ORC 38
2015	Edita Gruberová, Kay Stiefermann, Laura Polverelli, José Bros, Luca Grassi	Pietro Rizzo; Southwest German Radio Symphony Orchestra and Orpheus Vokalensemble	CD: Nightingale, NC 0715603
