= Sly (opera) =

Opera by Ermanno Wolf-Ferrari

- Opera by Ermanno Wolf-Ferrari
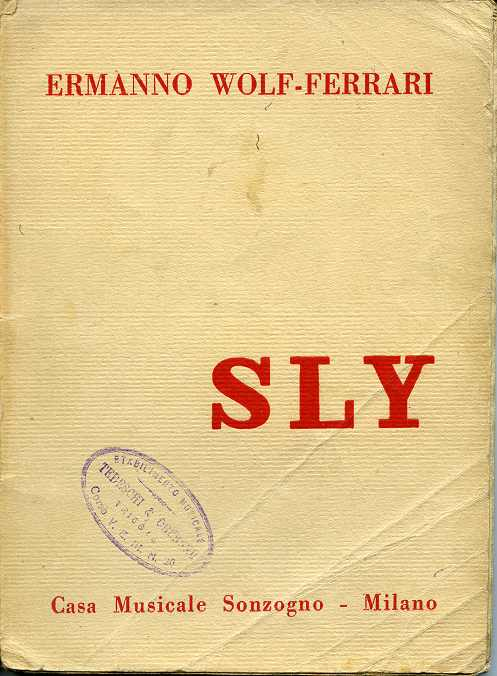
- Title page of the libretto
- Librettist: Giovacchino Forzano
- Language: Italian
- Premiere: 29 December 1927; La Scala, Milan

Sly, ovvero La leggenda del dormiente risvegliato (English: Sly, or The Legend of the Sleeper Awoken) is an opera in three acts by Ermanno Wolf-Ferrari to an Italian libretto by Giovacchino Forzano, based on the Induction to Shakespeare's The Taming of the Shrew. It was premiered at La Scala in Milan in 1927.

== History ==
The libretto of Sly was written, originally for Puccini, by Giovacchino Forzano, based on the Induction (the Prologue) to Shakespeare's The Taming of the Shrew. The German version of the libretto, Sly, oder Die Legende vom wiedererweckten Schläfer, was translated into Italian by Walter Dahms. Ermanno Wolf-Ferrari composed it for a premiere at La Scala in Milan in 1927.

== Plot and music ==
The first act is rather light-hearted, but verismo elements come into play when the tragedy begins to unfold in the later acts.

In the first act, the poet Sly is drinking in a London tavern, with people revelling and arguing. The musical highlight is Sly's song of the dancing bear, a theme that recurs throughout the opera. There are reminiscences of Kurt Weill and Leoncavallo. In the second act, the drunk Sly wakes up in a palace and is made to believe that he is its owner who was in a coma for 10 years, and that he has a wife, Dolly. In their first duet, verismo elements become heard. They culminate in the third act when he realises the truth: "No, io non sono un buffone". He kills himself, slashing his wrists, only to find out that Dolly loves him.

== Performance history ==
Sly was first performed at La Scala in Milan on 29 December 1927 with Aureliano Pertile and Mercedes Llopart. The latter was a last minute replacement for Margaret Sheridan who became ill days before the performance. Turin heard Sly in February 1928, before the run at La Scala was finished, with Nino Piccaluga in the title role and Valeria Manna as Dolly. Dresden and Hannover were the first German cities to hear it, during the autumn, while Nino Piccaluga and Gina Cigna sang it in Trieste.

During 1929 the work spread to Venice and Naples, with Carmelo Alabiso and Giuseppe Taccani respectively in the title role. The work started to disappear from Italian stages, but was widely performed in Germany and neighboring countries. Its German version remained in the repertory until the start of the Second World War, being heard somewhere or other practically every year until then. Outside Germany and Italy it was also given in Antwerp, the Hague, Budapest and Riga.

It more or less disappeared for some years, but had a spate of revivals in Germany in the 1950s culminating with a performance in Hanover in 1982, which was repeated next year. Its first modern performance in Italian took place in Zürich. That cast was headed by tenor José Carreras. Sly's United States premiere took place at the Washington National Opera in spring 1999, again with José Carreras. Also, there were productions at the Metropolitan Opera, New York City, in April 2002 and at the Gran Teatre del Liceu in Barcelona. The last premiere of the opera was co-produced by the Hungarian State Opera and the National Theatre of Szeged in May 2016 in Budapest.

== Roles ==
Roles, voice types, premiere cast
Role	Voice type	Premiere cast, 29 December 1927 Conductor: Ettore Panizza
Sly	tenor	Aureliano Pertile
Dolly	soprano	Mercedes Llopart
Count of Westmoreland	baritone	Luigi Rossi-Morelli
John Plake	bass	Ernesto Badini
Pageboy	soprano	Cesira Ferrari
Rosalina	soprano	Ida Conti and Iris Adami-Corradetti
Landlady	mezzo-soprano	Ida Mannarini
Country judge	tenor	Palmiro Domenichetti
Servant boy	tenor	Luigi Nardi
First nobleman/Moor	tenor	Giovanni Azzimonti
Second nobleman/Indian	tenor	Emilio Venturini
Third nobleman/old servant	tenor	Nello Palai
Fourth nobleman/Chinese man	bass-baritone	Aristide Baracchi
Fifth nobleman/doctor	baritone	Giuseppe Nessi
Sixth nobleman	bass	Antonio Laffi
Seventh nobleman	bass	Giacomo Carboni
Eighth nobleman	bass	Salvatore Baccaloni
First maid	mezzo-soprano	Maria Neveso
Second maid	mezzo-soprano	Gina Pedroni
Third maid	mezzo-soprano	Olga De Franco-Arduini
Snare/first servant	bass	Luigi Spartaco Marchi
Soldier/second servant	bass	Giuseppe Menni
Cook/third servant	bass	Amleto Galli

== Recordings ==
The creators of the main roles, including Aureliano Pertile, never recorded anything from the opera, although Ernesto Badini (the first John Plake) and Palmiro Domenichetti recorded the "duetto dei beoni". The "Canzone dell'orso" was done by Nino Piccaluga, who sang the work in Turin and Trieste, while both that and "No, non sono un buffone" was recorded by several other singers including Francesco Merli and Alessandro Valente.

The complete opera was recorded in German at the Staatsoper Hannover after a series of live performances in 1982, with Hans-Dieter Bader in the title role, Deborah Polaski as Dolly, and chorus and orchestra conducted by Robert Maxym.

The complete opera on Legato Classics was conducted on May 17, 1998 by Rafael Frühbeck de Burgos, with José Carreras (Sly), Juan Pons (The Count of Westmoreland), Daniela Dessi (Dolly), Carlos Chausson (John Plake), Piotr Beczala (A French Nobleman), Martin Zysset (A Negro), Volker Vogel (An Indian), Peter Keller (An Old Servant), Rudolf Hartmann (A Chinese), Jee-Hyun Kim (A Doctor), Stefania Kaluza (The Innkeeper), Capucine Chiaudani (Rosalina), Rory Bain (Snare), Gabriela Palikkruscheva (A Page), Miroslav Christoff (A Waiter), Anderson Marks (A Judge), Juuso Hemminski (A Soldier), and Heikki Yrttiaho (A Cook).

In 2000, the opera was recorded with Carreras and chorus and orchestra of the Liceu in Barcelona, published by Koch-Schwann.
