= Deborah Polaski =

American opera and concert singer (born 1949)

- Born: May 26, 1949 (age 77); Richland Center, Wisconsin
- Occupation: Soprano
- Years active: 1976 - 2003

Deborah Polaski (born May 26, 1949, in Richland Center, Wisconsin) is an American opera and concert singer (soprano). She has specialized in dramatic soprano roles and also sings mezzo-soprano roles occasionally.

== Biography ==
After being educated in the US, Polaski moved to Europe. Her debut was in 1976 as Senta in Wagner's Der fliegende Holländer at the Musiktheater im Revier in Gelsenkirchen. She subsequently sang on a number of opera stages in Germany (for example, Mannheim, Ulm, Karlsruhe, Darmstadt, Hannover and Freiburg). Her repertoire comprises primarily dramatic soprano roles, such as the Wagnerian roles of Isolde in Tristan und Isolde, Brünnhilde (Der Ring des Nibelungen), Kundry (Parsifal) and Ortrud (Lohengrin), and Richard Strauss' Ariadne auf Naxos and Elektra, Berlioz' Didon and Cassandre (Les Troyens), Alban Berg's Marie (Wozzeck) and Janáček's Kostelnička (Jenůfa).

Polaski achieved recognition in 1988 at the Bayreuth Festival in the role of Brünnhilde, conducted by Daniel Barenboim. In November 1988, after a single performance of Der fliegende Holländer with the San Francisco Opera, Polaski, a born-again Christian, canceled all her future engagements and announced she would sing only spiritual music. In 1991 she reprised her performance, and under James Levine she sang the role for five consecutive years from 1994.

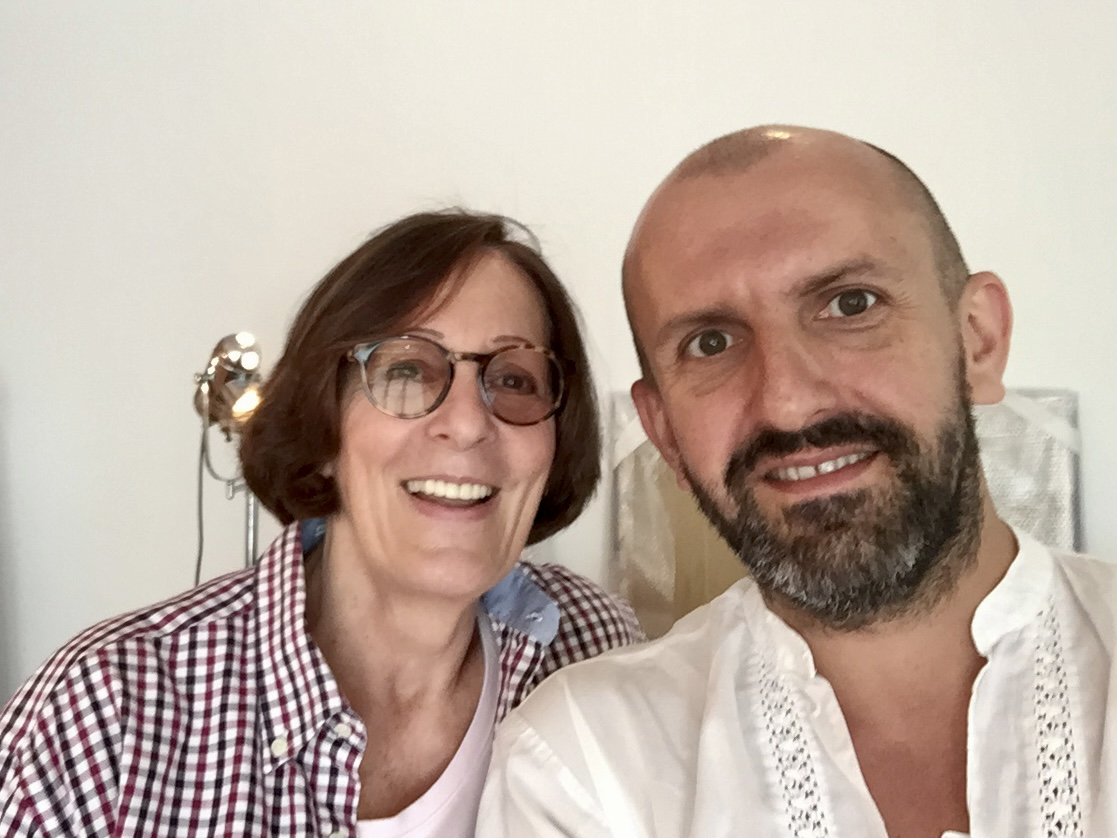
Deborah Polaski and Wojciech Parchem, 2016

She has appeared as a guest in Amsterdam, at the Gran Teatre del Liceu in Barcelona, at the Deutsche Oper Berlin, the Berlin State Opera and the Berlin Philharmonic, in Bonn, Chicago, Duisburg, Dresden, Florence, Frankfurt, Geneva, Genoa, Hamburg, Copenhagen and Cologne, at the Royal Opera House Covent Garden in London, in Lucerne, Mailand, Mannheim, Montreux and Munich, at the New York Metropolitan Opera and the Carnegie Hall, in Oslo, Paris, Rome, Salzburg, Stuttgart, at the Sydney Festival, in Tokyo, Vienna, Yokohama and Zürich. She made her debut at the Vienna State Opera in 1996 as Brünnhilde; she has also sung Ariadne, Elektra, Marie, Ortrud and Kundry there. She was named an Austrian Kammersänger in 2003. Polaski has also made a name for herself as a Lied and concert singer.

The title role of Elektra has been a feature of Polaski's repertoire for years, and she has performed it with major orchestras, directors and conductors (for example, Simone Young, Daniel Barenboim, Lorin Maazel, and Semyon Bychkov).

== Discography ==
Audio

- Brahms: Lieder
- Dukas: Ariane et Barbe-bleue
- Strauss: Elektra
- Wagner: Excerpts from Der Ring des Nibelungen, Walküre, Lohengrin and Tristan und Isolde
- Wiener Opernfest 2005 (Gala Concert)
- Wolf-Ferrari: Sly

DVD

- Berlioz: Les Troyens
- Wagner: Die Walküre, Siegfried, Götterdämmerung and Tristan und Isolde
- Gala Concert - Vienna State Opera 2005

VHS

- Covent Garden Re-Opening Gala
