= Henriette Méric-Lalande =

French operatic soprano (1798–1867)

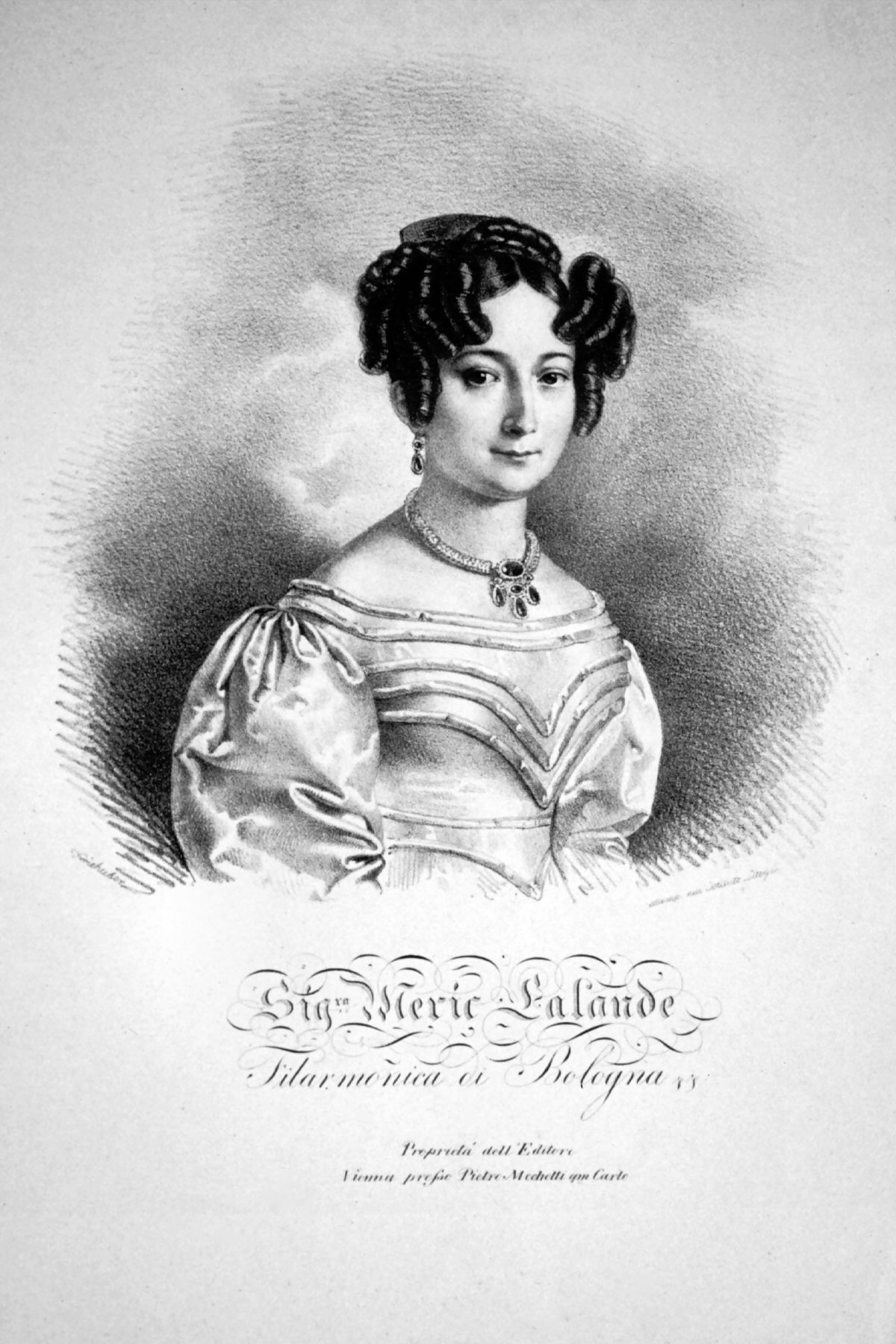
Henriette Meric-Lalande, Lithograph by Josef Kriehuber, about 1827

Henriette Méric-Lalande (4 April 1799 – 7 September 1867) was a French operatic soprano, one of the leading sopranos of the early 19th century.

== Life and career ==
Henriette Méric-Lalande was born in Dunkirk on 4 April 1799. the daughter and pupil of the conductor Jean-Baptiste Lalande. She made her stage debut in Nantes in 1814. In Paris, Castil-Blaze was impressed by her, and introduced her to Garcia in 1823. She then went to Milan for further studies with Bonfichi and Banderali. Méric-Lalande sang at La Fenice in Venice, 1823–24, where she sang Meyerbeer's Il crociato in Egitto. In 1826, she sang Bellini's Bianca e Gernando at the San Carlo in Naples.

At La Scala in Milan, she sang Imogene in Bellini's Il pirata in 1827, and Alaide in La straniera in 1829. The same year, she also sang the title role in Zaira in Parma. Still at La Scala, she sang the title role in Donizetti's Lucrezia Borgia in 1833, but by then she was already past her best.

She also appeared at the Théâtre-Italien in 1828, in London in 1830. She left the stage in 1838, as Elisabetta in Roberto Devereux. An accomplished virtuoso singer, she also enjoyed acclaim in Rossini operas such as La donna del lago, Mosè in Egitto, Semiramide.

According to the music critic Henry Chorley, Méric-Lalande began having vocal problems as early as 1829, when it was noticed that she developed a wide and slow vibrato; however, through her highly dramatic temperament she was able to conceal it to some extent.

She was married to a cornist by the name of Méric, and added his name to hers. She died at Chantilly.
