= Giacomo Sagripanti =

Italian conductor

Giacomo Sagripanti is an Italian conductor, born January 28, 1982, in Giulianova, Abruzzo. He specializes in opera and symphonic music.

He began his musical studies at the Rossini Conservatory in Pesaro, in piano and composition. He also trained in symphonic music at the Academy of Music in Pesaro, before taking a three-year course at the Italian Opera School of the Teatro comunale in Bologna. He became assistant to renowned conductors such as Renato Palumbo and Bruno Bartoletti.

He began his career with a production of Hansel and Gretel, in a children's show that toured extensively in Italy. He was subsequently invited to conduct rarities at the Martina Franca Festival, including Donizetti's Gianni di Parigi, Rossini's Aureliano in Palmira and Bellini's Zaira. He also took part in productions by the Associazione Lirica e Concertistica Italiana (ASLICO). He has conducted at Dresden's Semperoper (Rossini's La Cenerentola), Venice's La Fenice (Puccini's Madama Butterfly), Zürich's Opernhaus (Donizetti's L'elisir d'amore), Valencia's Palacio de las Artes Reina-Sofíade (Rossini's Stabat Mater) and at some of the world's most important festivals (Rossini Opera Festival in Pesaro, Verona Arena). In 2013, he made his US debut, conducting La Cenerentola with Seattle Opera.

In France, he made his debut at the Opéra de Limoges (La Traviata), then in the orchestra pit at the Opéra national de Paris from 2013 (Cenerentola), replacing conductor Bruno Campanella at short notice. He has since been engaged on numerous occasions by the Opéra, to extremely positive reviews (2013/14: Bellini's I Capuleti ed i Montecchi; 2014/15: Rossini's Le Barbier de Séville; Massenet's Werther; 2016/17: Bizet's Carmen; 2018/19: Elisir d'amore; La Traviata; 2019/20: Madame Butterfly; 2021/22: Rigoletto; 2023/24: La Traviata). He has also conducted at the Chorégies d'Orange, Théâtre des Champs Elysées and Philharmonie de Paris.

In 2016, Sagripanti won "Young Conductor of the Year" at the International Opera Awards. After serving as principal guest conductor at the Bari Opera until 2023, he becomes music director of the Tbilisi Orchestra and Opera.

He is a constant presence at major opera houses such as London's Royal Opera House Covent Garden (Traviata, Don Pasquale), the Wiener Staatsoper (Traviata, Tosca, Anna Bolena, Werther, Barbiere, Cenerentola), Munich State Opera (Cenerentola, Favorite), Moscow Bolshoi (Ballo in maschera, Don Carlo, Tosca), Barcelona Liceu (Tosca, Viaggio a Reims, Lucia), Seville Teatro Maestranza (Cenerentola), and Naples Teatro San Carlo (Puritans, concerts).

He is married to Czech soprano, Zuzana Marková, and they live in Prague, Czech Republic.

== Discography ==
- Bellini - Zaïra - Orchestra internazionale d'Italia, G. Sagripanti, direction - Bongiovanni - 2016
- Donizetti - Gianni da Parigi - Orchestra internazionale d'Italia, G. Sagripanti, direction - Bongiovanni - 2013
- Rossini - Levy Sekgapane (ténor), Münchner Rundfunkorchester, Giacomo Sagripanti, direction – Giovin Fiamma - PRIMA002 - 2019
- Dreams - Pretty Yende (soprano), Orchestra Sinfonica di Milano Giuseppe Verdi, Giacomo Sagripanti, direction - Sony - 2016
