= Renata Scotto =

Italian soprano (1934–2023)

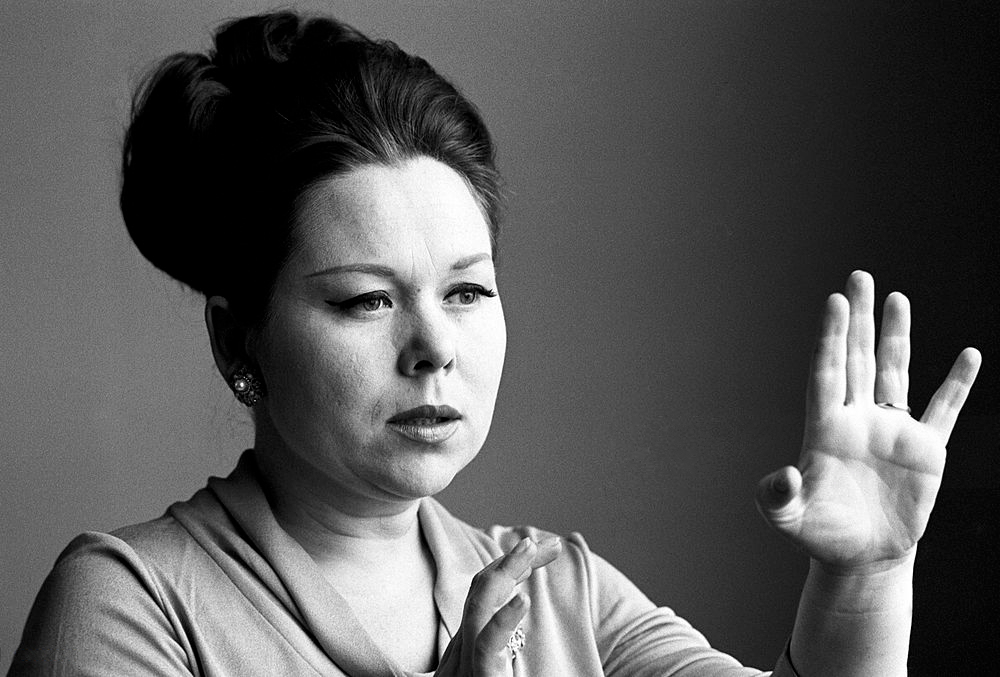
- Scotto in 1967
- Born: 24 February 1934; Savona, Kingdom of Italy
- Died: 16 August 2023 (aged 89); Savona, Italy
- Occupations: Operatic soprano; Opera director; Voice teacher
- Organizations: La Scala; Metropolitan Opera

Renata Scotto (24 February 1934 – 16 August 2023) was an Italian soprano, opera director, and voice teacher. Recognised for her sense of style, her musicality, and as a remarkable singer-actress, Scotto is considered to have been one of the preeminent opera singers of her generation.

For more than 40 years, she performed in some 45 roles, first in Italy, then as a leading soprano of the Metropolitan Opera (Met). She is remembered especially for the title roles of Verdi's La traviata, performed for her stage debut in Milan in 1952, and Puccini's Madama Butterfly, which was her first role at the Met and her last there in 1987, but also for belcanto works such as Donizetti's Lucia di Lammermoor. She appeared in the first telecast from the Met in 1977, as Mimi in Puccini's La bohème, alongside Luciano Pavarotti and conducted by James Levine. She later expanded her repertoire by roles such as the Marschallin in Der Rosenkavalier by Richard Strauss, Elle in Poulenc's La voix humaine, and Madame Flora in Menotti's The Medium. As opera director she worked for the Met, the Arena di Verona, and other leading opera houses.

== Life and career ==
Scotto was born in Savona, an industrial town and port on the Ligurian Sea, on 24 February 1934. Her father was a police officer and her mother a seamstress. During World War II, her mother took her and her sister to the nearby mountains, taking sewing jobs from the fascists, the Nazis, and the Americans. After the war, the girl experienced her first opera in her hometown, Verdi's Rigoletto with Tito Gobbi in the title role, and decided then, at age twelve, that she would become an opera singer.

She studied music at the Milan Conservatory, from age 16, living in a nuns' convent, and making a living by sewing and cleaning jobs. She studied first with Emilio Ghirardini as a mezzo-soprano. She won a competition in 1952, with the prize of a debut at the Teatro Nuovo in Milan. She performed the title role of Verdi's La traviata, first in her home town on Christmas Eve in front of a sold-out house. The next day, she made her 'official' opera debut at the Teatro Nuovo.

=== Italy ===
Renata Scotto in 1957

In 1953, Scotto auditioned at La Scala for the role of Walter in Catalani's La Wally, with Renata Tebaldi and Mario del Monaco in lead roles. After her audition, one of the judges, the conductor Victor de Sabata, was heard saying, "Forget about the rest." La Wally opened on 7 December 1953, and Scotto was called back for fifteen curtain calls while Tebaldi and Del Monaco each received seven. She was offered more supporting roles at La Scala, but rejected them in favour of performing larger roles at regional houses in Italy. She appeared at the Rome Opera in 1955 as Sophie in Massenet's Werther, and at La Fenice in Venice in 1956 as Traviata, and as Micaela in Bizet's Carmen. On a recommendation by tenor Alfredo Kraus she took extra voice training with Mercedes Llopart. Kraus was to become a frequent partner on stage and for recordings. She was a member of the ensemble at La Scala from 1957, performing roles such as Donizetti Adina in L'elisir d'amore and Norina in Don Pasquale but was not accepted as La Traviata by Franco Zeffirelli.

Scotto's major breakthrough came in 1957 when she performed at the Edinburgh Festival in a La Scala production of Bellini's La Sonnambula; Maria Callas was cast as Amina, and it was so successful that the company added an unscheduled fifth performance. Callas, who was under contract for four performances, declined to perform in the added performance but allowed the La Scala management, who had announced her for the fifth performance without her consent, to explain her departure from the festival as being due to illness. Scotto, stepping in as Amina, performed on 3 September 1957, and became an international opera star at age 23.

During the 1960s she became one of the leading singers in the belcanto revival initiated by Callas during the 1950s. She sang Bellini's Zaira and La straniera, Donizetti's Maria di Rohan, in Meyerbeer's Robert le diable, and in other repertoire rarities. In 1964 she performed with La Scala at the Bolshoi Theatre in Moscow, the first opera company tour to the Soviet Union during the Cold War years. In 1967 she appeared at La Scala as Giulietta in Bellini's I Capuleti e i Montecchi and as Donizetti's Lucia di Lammermoor, in 1969 as Gluck's Euridice, and in 1970 as Elena in Verdi's I vespri siciliani.

In 1967, she recorded with the conductor, Sir John Barbirolli, Madama Butterfly by Giacomo Puccini of high acclaim.

=== United States ===
Scotto's American debut was as Mimì in Puccini's La bohème at the Lyric Opera of Chicago in 1960. On 13 October 1965, Scotto made her Metropolitan Opera debut as Madama Butterfly, with John Alexander as Pinkerton. Louis Snyder from the New York Herald Tribune wrote:

Miss Scotto, as a prima donna, harks back to the days when it was assumed that, to be imported by the Met, you had substantial voice and experience, and the New York test was one of communication of personality. Wednesday night, Miss Scotto arrived with all three, and if she went her own way in portraying Cio-Cio-San-that is, outside the proscribed bounds of the effective Aoyama production-hardly anyone cared. For she sings musically and affectingly, with pathos and color and humor in the voice, in a manner to enfold the listener in the first row of the orchestra or the last row of the family circle, Miss Scotto is a singer for all price ranges. And they let her know it Wednesday night after "Un bel di" with as loud an ovation as has been heard in the House this or maybe even last season. It would seem to be a case of instant love between Miss Scotto and the New York public.

She went on to sing more than 300 performances in 26 roles there through 1987 and settled to live with her family in nearby Westchester County. When James Levine became chief conductor in 1971, she was granted several new roles in new productions, including Vitellia in the company's first production of Mozart's La Clemenza di Tito, in Meyerbeer's Le prophète, and Zandonai's Francesca da Rimini.

Scotto opened the series of Live from the Met telecasts in 1977 with La bohème, alongside Luciano Pavarotti. She starred in the telecasts of Puccini's Manon Lescaut and Il trittico, Verdi's Luisa Miller and Don Carlo, Zandonai's Francesca da Rimini, and as Desdemona in Verdi's Otello, alongside Jon Vickers, among others.

Scotto also had success at the Met as Ponchielli's La Gioconda. Moving into the heavier Verdi repertoire in the 1970s, she appeared as Elisabetta in Don Carlo, Luisa Miller, Lady Macbeth, Leonora in Il trovatore, and in the Requiem, all conducted by James Levine. She is remembered as a singing actress; Plácido Domingo said in a 1978 interview: "There is an emphasis, a feeling she puts behind every word she interprets."

At the performance of Bellini’s Norma which opened the Met's 1981/1982 season, fans of Maria Callas yelled negative remarks and booed Scotto from the moment she set foot on the stage. Many were removed from the opera house by security personnel. Writing for The New Yorker, critic Andrew Porter observed, "'Casta diva" was a disaster. Sustained notes were often unsteady. The repeated A's at the climax lurched over, both times, into a sharp and strident B-flat, a curdled scream. The descending scales of the cabaletta were slithers. At coloratura passages she grabbed - and missed." Critic Peter G. Davis noted in New York magazine: "Time and again, Scotto reminded us of her sovereign musicality, her instinctive feeling for the rhythmic life of the notes, her ability to mold finely sculpted phrases, and her sensitivity for coloring the words into emotions that instantly define a dramatic situation."

=== Later career ===
In the late part of her career, Scotto took on the roles of Giordano's Fedora (Barcelona, 1988), Charlotte in Massenet's Werther, the Marschallin in Der Rosenkavalier by Richard Strauss (Charleston Spoleto Festival, 1995 and Catania), Kundry in Wagner's Parsifal (Schwerin, 1995), Elle in Poulenc's La voix humaine (Maggio Musicale Fiorentino 1993, Concertgebouw, Amsterdam, and Liceu, Barcelona, 1996), Madame Flora in Menotti's The Medium (Torino, 1999), and Klytemnestra in Elektra by Richard Strauss (Baltimore, 2000 and Sevilla, 2002).

Scotto's later concert appearances included Berlioz's Les nuits d'été, lieder by Mahler and Richard Strauss, as well as Schoenberg's Erwartung with the Accademia di Santa Cecilia Orchestra and RAI Orchestra of Torino.

=== Stage director ===
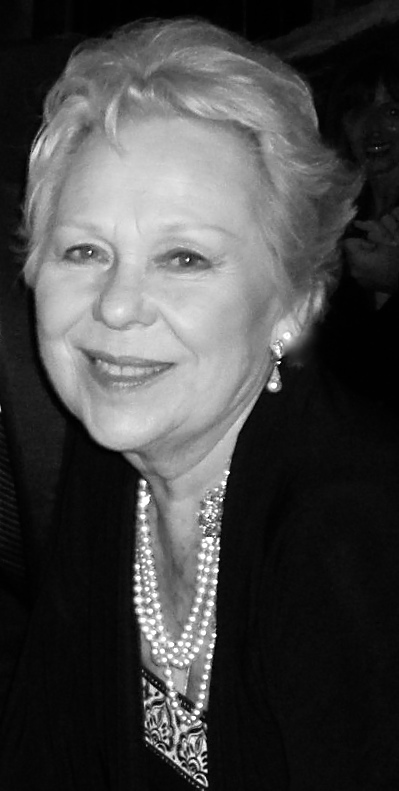
2009

When she was about to retire from the stage, Scotto turned successfully to directing opera as well; she directed her last production of the Met of Madama Butterfly, becoming the first woman at the house to stage an opera and star in it. Her director credits also include productions of this opera in the Arena di Verona, Florida Grand Opera, and Palm Beach Opera), Bellini's Il pirata (Festival Belliniano, Catania, 1993) and La sonnambula (Catania, 1994); an Emmy Award-winning telecast of La traviata (New York City Opera, 1995); Norma (Finnish National Opera); Adriana Lecouvreur (Santiago, 2002); Lucia di Lammermoor (Music Hall of Thessaloniki, 2004); La Wally (Dallas Opera, Theater Bern); La bohème (Lyric Opera of Chicago, 2007 and Palm Beach Opera, 2009); Turandot (Athens, 2009); La sonnambula (Florida Grand Opera and Michigan Opera Theatre, 2008), and Verdi's Un ballo in maschera (Lyric Opera of Chicago, 2010).

=== Teaching ===
Scotto taught voice in Italy and the United States, along with academic posts at the Accademia Nazionale di Santa Cecilia in Rome and the Juilliard School in New York City. She coached singers including Renée Fleming, Anna Netrebko, and Deborah Voigt.

=== Personal life ===
Scotto married Lorenzo Anselmi in 1960, who had been principal violinist at La Scala, and became her manager. The couple had a daughter and a son. Her husband died in 2021.

Scotto died in her home town of Savona on 16 August 2023, aged 89.

The Metropolitan Opera remembered after her death:

Her 1965 Met debut in the title role of Madama Butterfly revealed her to be an extraordinarily compelling and complete artist, with the ability to create a deeply moving character through magnetic stage presence, expressive musical phrasing, and unfailingly dramatic delivery of the Italian text.

== Awards ==
Scotto won two Emmys, for the telecast of La Gioconda and her direction of La traviata from NYCO.

- 1992 – Frankfurter Allgemeine Zeitung award for her interpretation of the Marschallin in Der Rosenkavalier.
- 2007 – Recipient of the Opera News Award by the Metropolitan Opera Guild.
- 2009 – Opera Tampa's Anton Coppola Award for Excellence in the Arts.
- Franco Albiatti della Critica Italiana award.

== Recordings ==
- Bellini: Norma (1979) Columbia Masterworks/CBS
- Cilea: Adriana Lecouvreur (1977) Columbia Msterworks/CBS
- Donizetti: Lucia di Lammermoor (di Stefano, Bastianini; Sanzogno, 1959) Deutsche Grammophon
- Giordano: Andrea Chénier (Domingo, Milnes; Levine, 1976) RCA Red Seal
- Leoncavallo: Pagliacci (1978) EMI Classics
- Mascagni: Cavalleria rusticana (Domingo, Elvira; Levine, 1978) RCA Red Seal
- Meyerbeer: Le prophète (1976) CBS
- Puccini:
  - La bohème (1961) Deutsche Grammophon
  - Edgar (1977) [live] CBS
  - Madama Butterfly (Bergonzi, di Stasio, Panerai; Barbirolli 1966) EMI
  - Madama Butterfly (Domingo; Maazel 1980). CBS Masterworks
  - Tosca (Domingo, Bruson; Levine, 1980) EMI Classics
  - Le Villi (Domingo; 1978) CBS
- Verdi:
  - Nabucco (Luchetti, Manuguerra, Ghiaurov; Muti, 1977–78) EMI Classics
  - Otello (Domingo, Milnes; Levine, 1978) RCA Red Seal
  - Rigoletto (Kraus, Bastianini; Gavazzeni, 1960) Deutsche Grammophon
  - Rigoletto (Cossotto, Bergonzi, Fischer-Dieskau; Kubelík, 1964) Deutsche Grammophon
  - La traviata (G.Raimondi, Bastianini; Votto, 1962) Deutsche Grammophon
  - La traviata (Kraus, Bruson; Muti, 1980) EMI
- Wolf-Ferrari: Il segreto di Susanna (Bruson; Pritchard, 1980) CBS

== Publications ==
- Scotto: More Than a Diva (memoir) by Renata Scotto and Octavio Roca, Doubleday & Company, Inc, 1984. ISBN 0-385-18039-X
- Konrad Dryden: Riccardo Zandonai, A Biography, Foreword by Renata Scotto, Peter Lang Inc, 1999. ISBN 0-8204-3649-6
