= Alfredo Kraus =

Spanish tenor (1927–1999)

Background information
- Born: November 24, 1927; Las Palmas de Gran Canaria, Spain
- Died: September 10, 1999 (aged 71) Madrid, Spain
- Genre: opera
- Occupation: Opera singer (tenor)

Alfredo Kraus as the Duke in Rigoletto at his Metropolitan Opera debut.

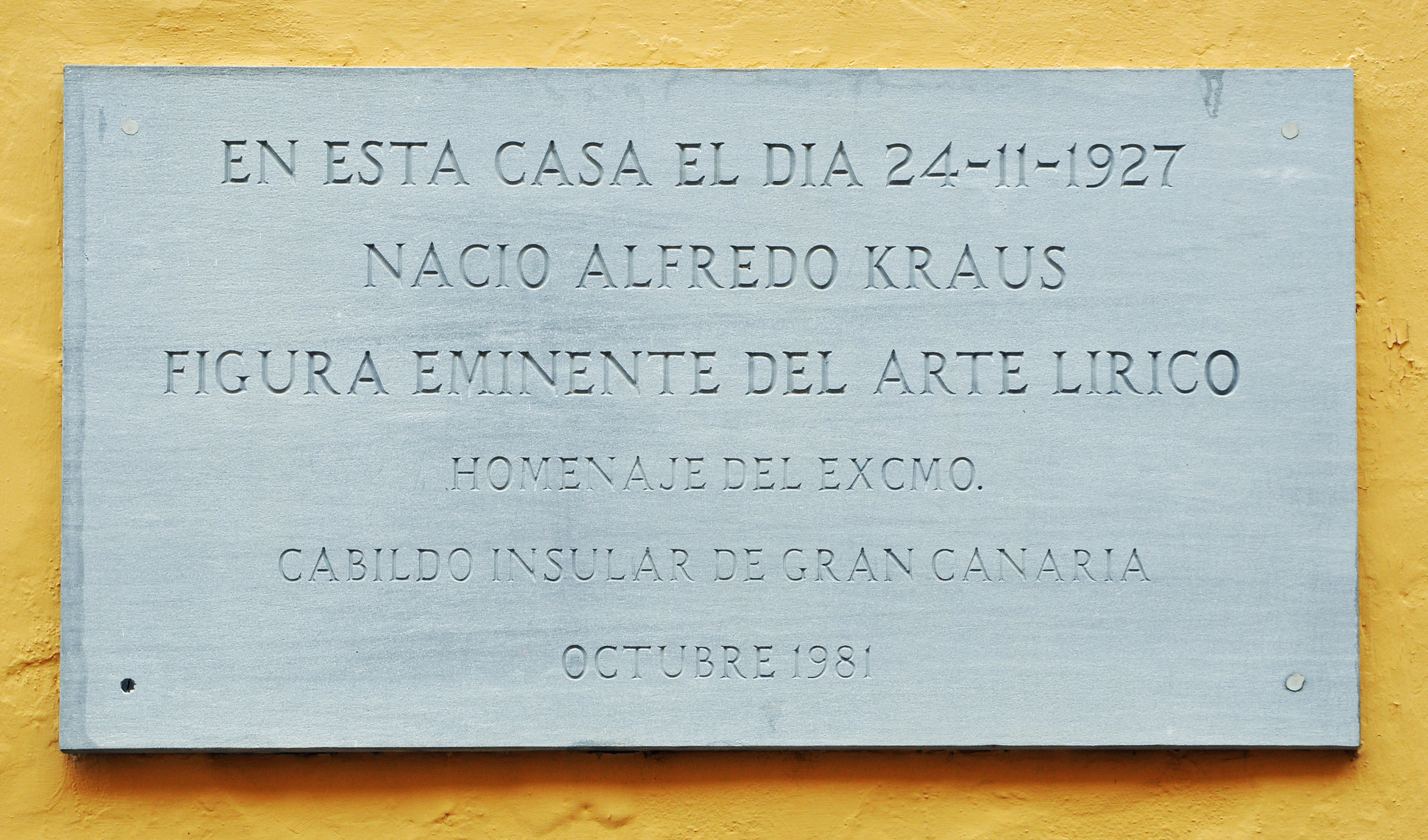
Memorial tablet on the birthplace of Alfredo Kraus in the Calle de Colón in Las Palmas, Gran Canaria

Alfredo Kraus Trujillo (Spanish pronunciation: [alˈfɾeðo kɾaws tɾuˈxiʎo]; 24 November 1927 – 10 September 1999) was a distinguished Spanish tenor from the Canary Islands, particularly known for the artistry he brought to opera's bel canto roles.

Kraus was considered an outstanding interpreter of the title role in Massenet's opera Werther, and especially of its famous aria "Pourquoi me réveiller?"

== Early years ==
Kraus was born in Las Palmas de Gran Canaria. His father was Austrian and his mother was Spanish. He began his musical career with piano lessons at the age of four, and he sang in the school choir by age eight. His older brother, Francisco Kraus Trujillo, a baritone, studied music and opera alongside him.

== Career ==
After refining his technique singing Spanish zarzuela on stage in Madrid and Barcelona, Kraus made his professional opera debut in Cairo in 1956 as the Duke in Rigoletto, which became one of his signature roles. In 1958, he sang Alfredo at the Teatro Nacional de São Carlos in Lisbon in a production of La traviata with Maria Callas, a live recording of which was later released.

Kraus made his Covent Garden debut as Edgardo in Lucia di Lammermoor in 1959 and his La Scala debut as Elvino in La sonnambula in 1960. He made his American debut with Lyric Opera of Chicago in 1962, and his Metropolitan Opera debut in 1966 in Rigoletto, the role of his last performance there in 1994.

In subsequent decades, Kraus extended his repertoire to include more Italian operas such as Lucrezia Borgia, La fille du régiment, Linda di Chamounix, Don Pasquale and La favorita by Donizetti; and French operas such as Roméo et Juliette, Les contes d'Hoffmann, Faust and Lakmé, while continuing to sing his hallmark roles of Werther and of Des Grieux in Manon. He also recorded a number of rarely performed French operas including La jolie fille de Perth and Les pêcheurs de perles, both by Georges Bizet, and La muette de Portici by Daniel Auber. He also performed in some very well known works, such as Don Giovanni and Faust.

Kraus came to be virtually synonymous with such lyric tenor roles as Werther, Faust, Don Ottavio (Don Giovanni), Nemorino, and Arturo. He was also known for his performances of Spanish music, notably many classics from the zarzuela repertoire, which he continued to perform live on stage in Spain until the end of his career, and many of which he recorded complete for EMI Spain as well as for his own label, Carillon.

== Technique ==
Thanks to his superlative technique and careful husbanding of his vocal resources, Kraus sang onstage until his early 70s. He studied voice technique in Milan with Mercedes Llopart. Later in his career he sought advice from the distinguished tenor Giacomo Lauri-Volpi, who demonstrated to Kraus what both called "intercostal breathing," which enabled the aging Kraus to sustain high tones more easily.

Kraus was also noted for extremely refined musicianship, accompanied by a seemingly effortless high register. As a result, many opera connoisseurs consider him to be one of the best tenors of the end of the 20th century. He was admired for his cultivated musical education and his complete respect for his chosen profession. His first priority was the integrity of his artistic interpretation of a piece, rather than his formidable range and excellent technique.

He performed all over the world, including the Teatro Colón in Buenos Aires, Teatro Municipal in Caracas, Teatro Municipal in Santiago, Chile, Teatro Municipal in Rio de Janeiro, and the Liceu in Barcelona.

In 1991, Kraus was awarded the Prince of Asturias Award. In 1997, his home city of Las Palmas de Gran Canaria opened The Alfredo Kraus Auditorium in his honor.

== Later years ==
The loss of his wife in 1997 affected Kraus so deeply that he stopped performing for eight months. A proud and strong-willed man, he eventually returned to the stage and to teaching. He said, "I don't have the will for singing but I must do it, because, in a sense, it is a sign that I have overcome the tragedy. Singing is a form of admitting that I'm alive."

Kraus died on 10 September 1999 in Madrid, at the age of 71, after a long illness.

== Videography ==
- The Metropolitan Opera Centennial Gala (1983), Deutsche Grammophon DVD, 00440-073-4538, 2009
- James Levine's 25th Anniversary Metropolitan Opera Gala (1996), Deutsche Grammophon DVD, B0004602-09, 2005

== Gallery ==
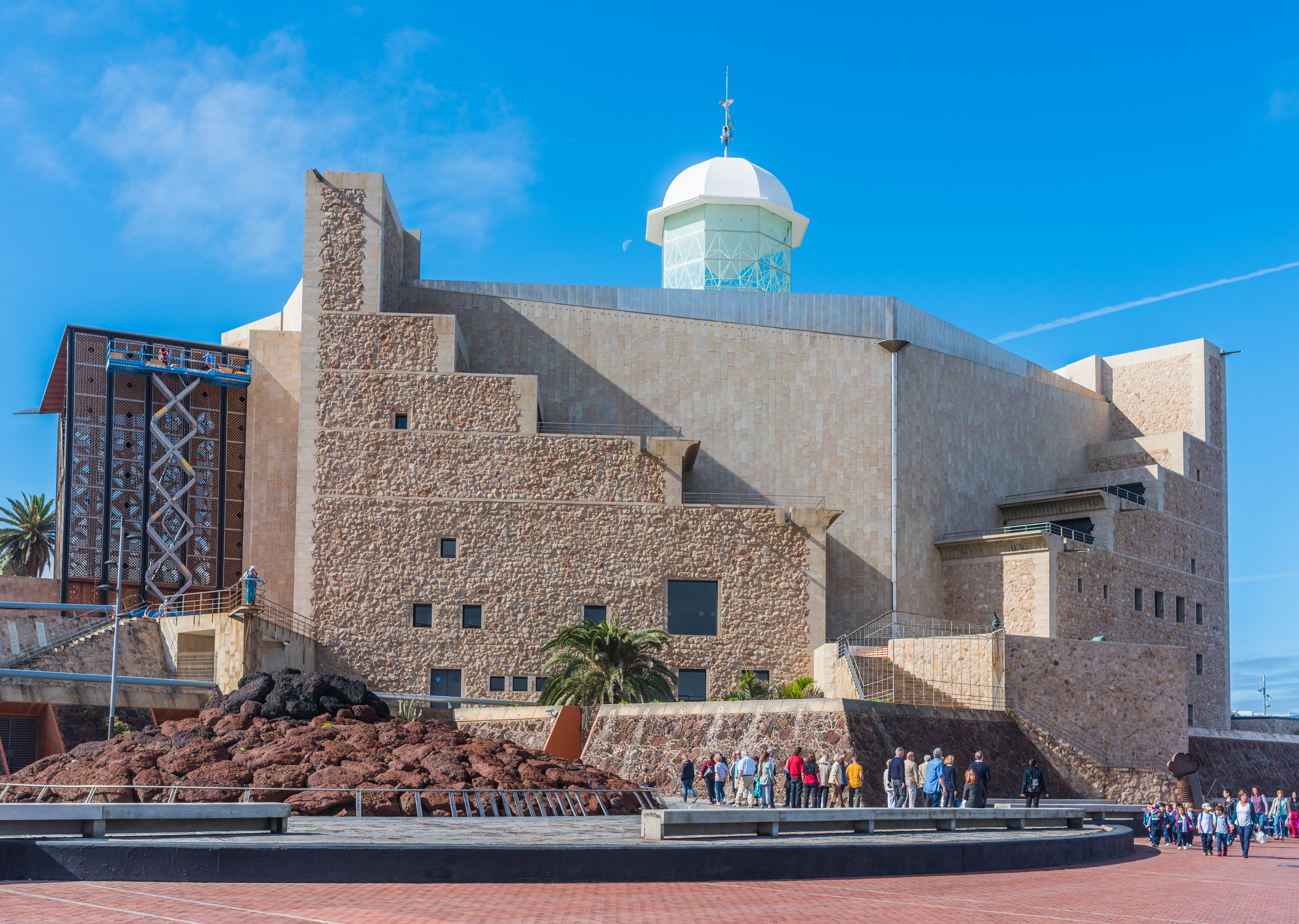
Alfredo Kraus auditorium

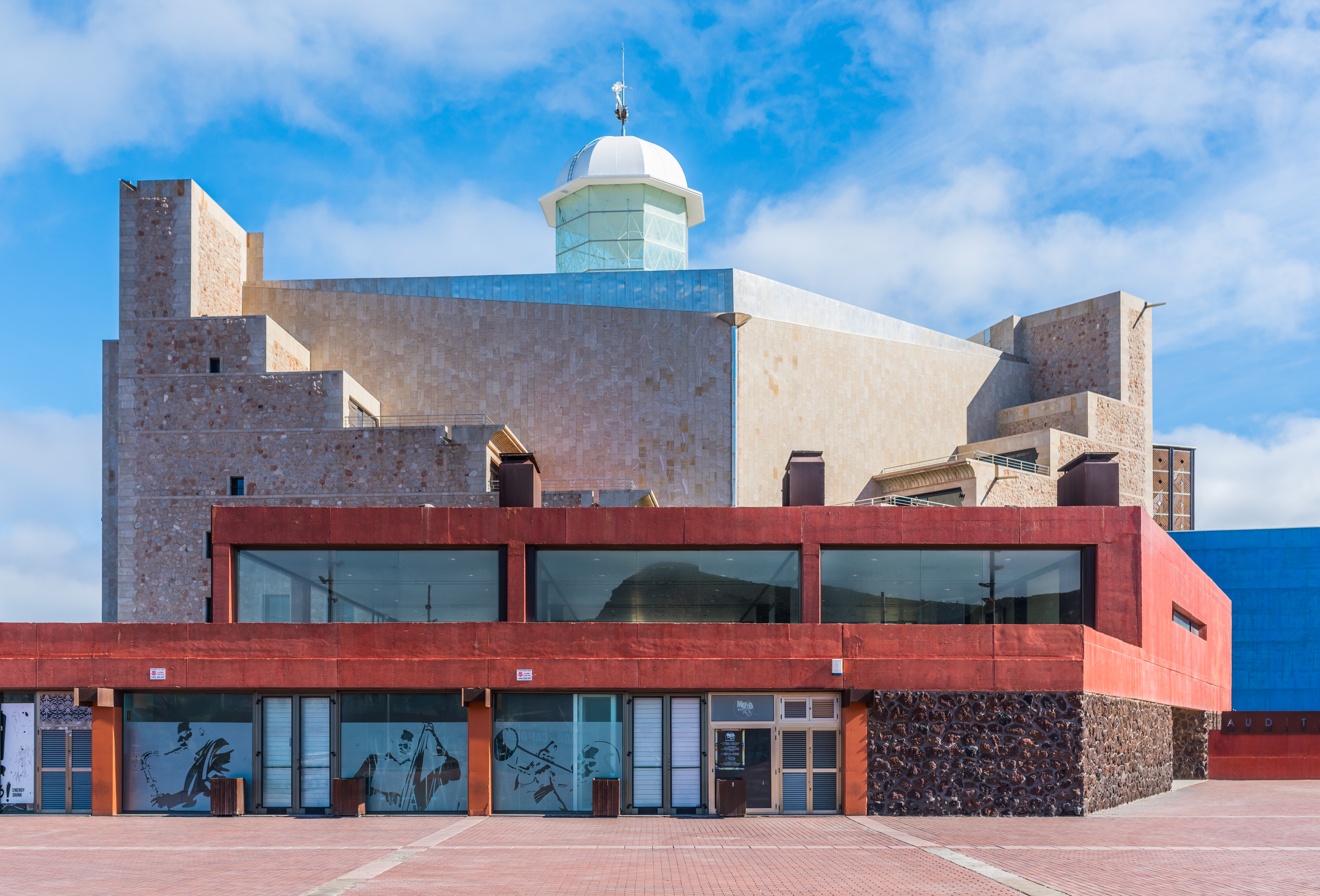
Alfredo Kraus auditorium

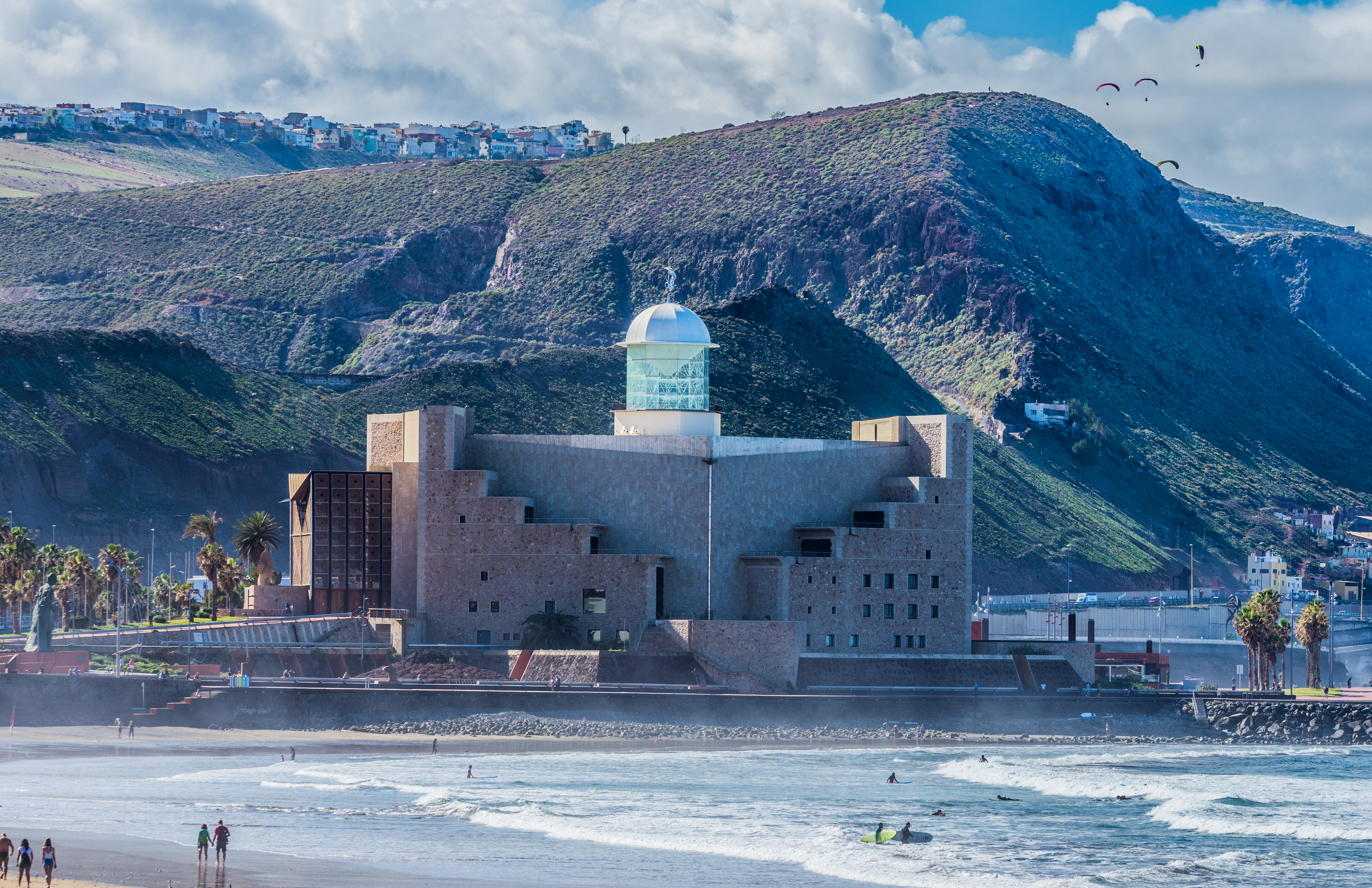
Alfredo Kraus auditorium

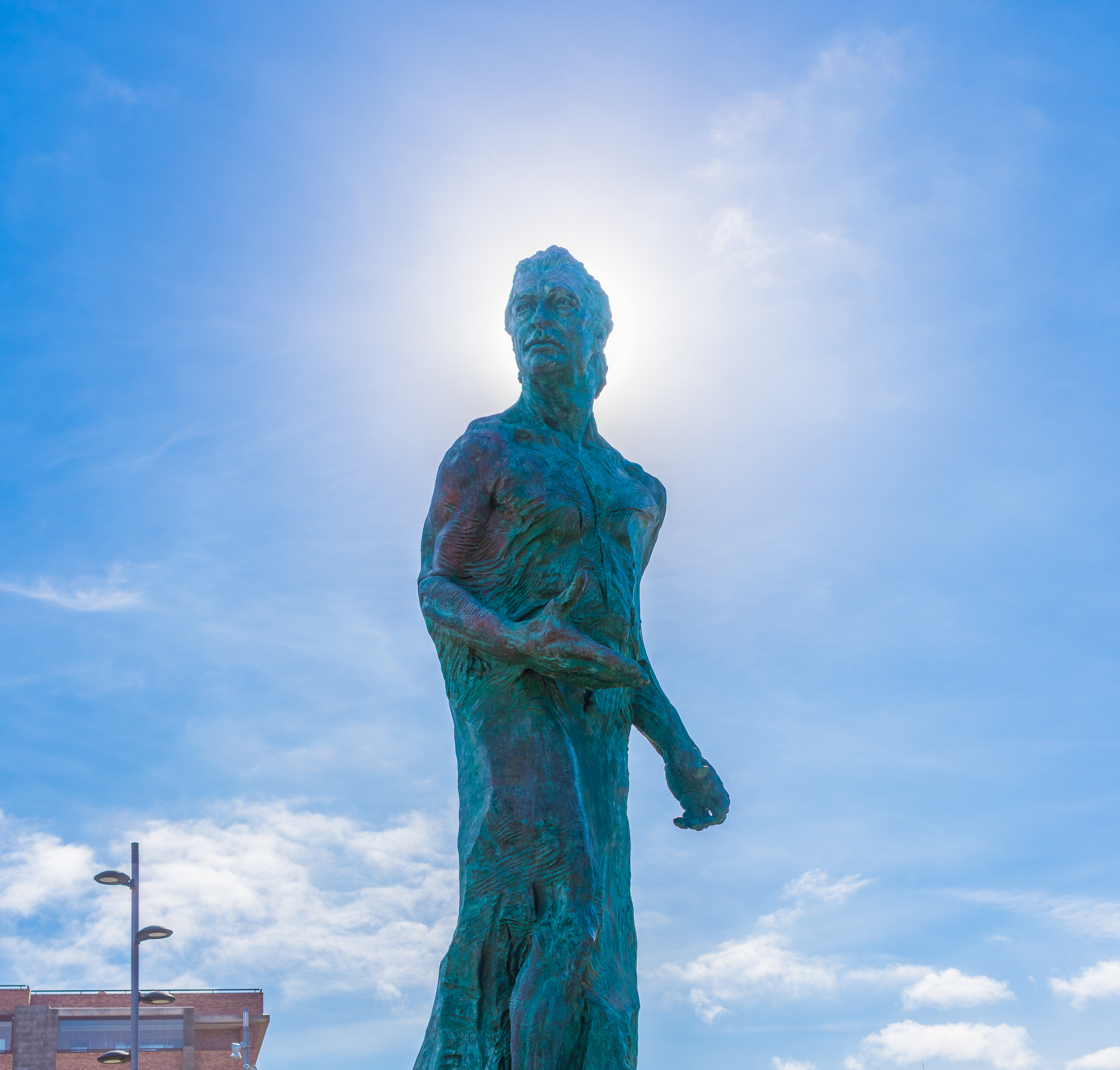
Statue of Alfredo Kraus outside the auditorium

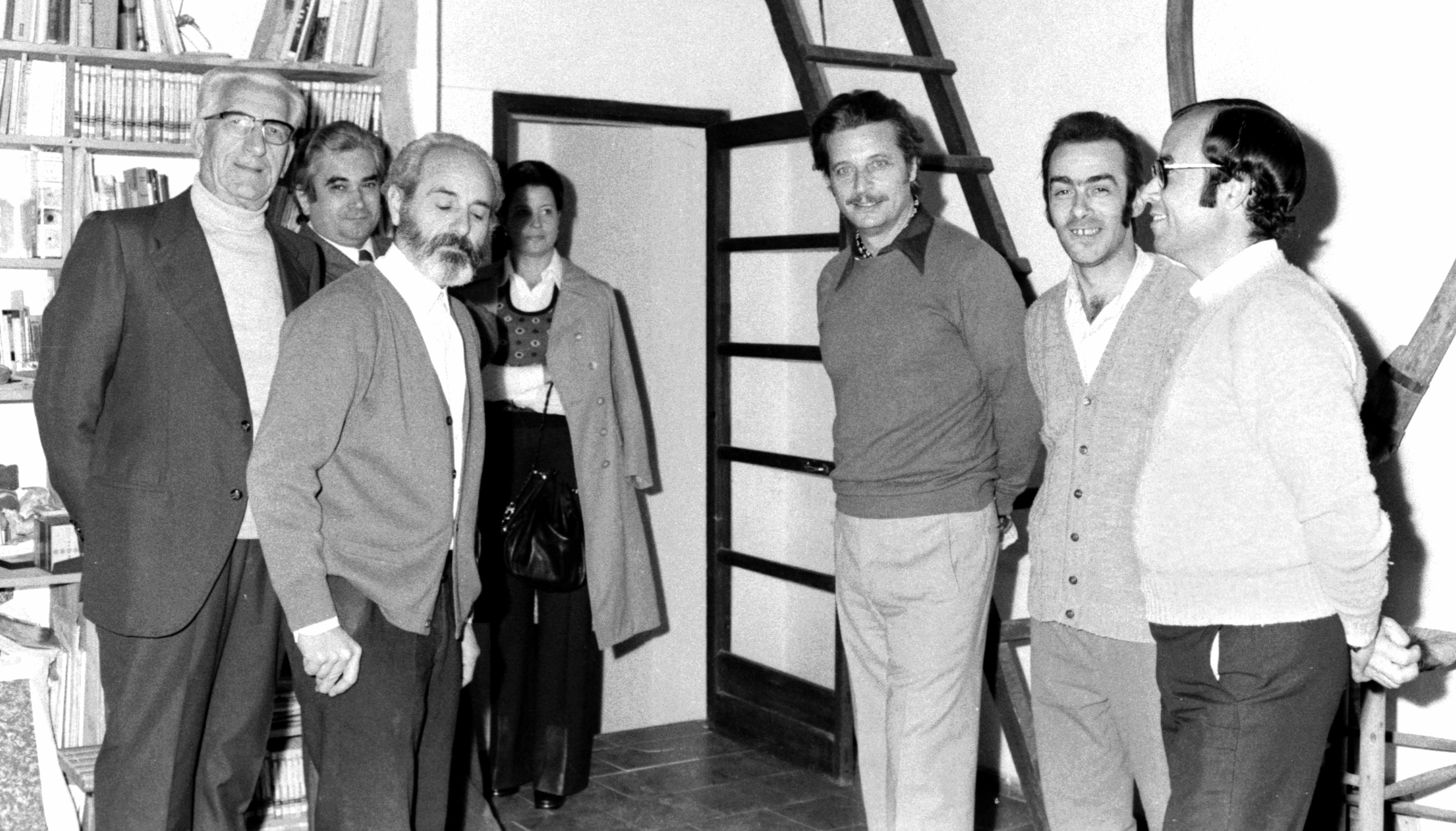
Alfredo Kraus in Alginet, 1973.
