= Francesco Florimo =

Italian music historian and composer

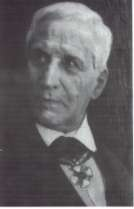
Francesco Florimo

Francesco Florimo (12 October 1800 – 18 December 1888) was an Italian composer, music historian and critic.

== Early life and friendship with Bellini ==
Florimo was born in San Giorgio Morgeto in Calabria and enrolled at the age of 12 (or 15) at the Naples Conservatory (Conservatorio di San Pietro a Majella). There he studied with Nicola Antonio Zingarelli and Giacomo Tritto and met Vincenzo Bellini, a student companion who became a lifelong friend and the recipient of Florimo's fervent devotion. Florimo later dedicated several works to Bellini, including his Traslazione delle ceneri di Vincenzo Bellini: memorie e impressioni, (Naples, 1876) and Bellini: memorie e lettere (Florence 1882). This material contains much that is important and indispensable, but some of the letters were partially or entirely fabricated, and several of Florimo's more dubious claims were based on 'remembered conversations' that cannot have occurred. These errors have caused numerous difficulties for subsequent Bellini scholars.

== Career as a musician ==
At the conservatory Florimo became a singing instructor and director of vocal concerts. His conservative Metodo di canto (Naples, 1840?; Milan, 1841–1843; enlarged 1861) was influential and widely praised. It claimed to be based on the teaching methods of the castrato Girolamo Crescentini, who was still head of the Naples Conservatory singing school at the time, and was meant to restore the 'antico bello', or true Italian style of singing from the time of Alessandro Scarlatti, Nicola Porpora, and Francesco Durante, which had been largely supplanted by the then fashionable 'la moda barocca'.

In his youth Florimo composed cantatas and masses. Among his later compositions, most notable are the Sinfonia funebre per la morte di Bellini (Milan, 1836) and his songs, many of which are in a popular Neapolitan style. Several collections of his songs appeared in the series Collezione completa delle canzoncine nazionali napoletane (published by Girard in Naples) and some songs were reprinted (ca. 1853) by Ricordi in Milan. These may contain genuine transcriptions of popular material, but to what degree, it is difficult or almost impossible to determine.

== Career as an archivist and historian ==
In 1826 Florimo became archivist-librarian of the Naples Conservatory, and under his direction the library acquired much of the bulk of its expensive holdings, including rare music manuscripts and other archival material pertaining to masters of the Neapolitan school. Florimo's enlargement of this collection has been called his most enduring and important legacy.

He published a history of the Naples Conservatory, initially in two volumes as Cenno storico sulla scuola musicale di Napoli (Naples, 1869), and later expanded it into four volumes as La scuola musicale di Napoli e i suoi conservatori (Naples, 1880–82). Upon sending the first volume to Verdi in 1869, Florimo wrote: "Without being either a man of science or a man of letters, I have ventured to write a book. If the world only regards my good intentions, then it will have indulgence for me, otherwise I shall be lost." Despite Florimo's significant shortcomings as a historian, much of his work remains unique and irreplaceable.

Florimo's relationship with Saverio Mercadante, director of the Naples Conservatory from 1840, was often less than amicable, and after the latter's death in 1870, Florimo minimized much of his praise of Mercadante in the second edition of Cenno storico. He accomplished this in many places by simply adding the word 'not'. He also attempted, unsuccessfully, to recruit Verdi as Mercadante's successor as director.

At the time of the first Bayreuth Festival, Florimo published a pamphlet entitled Riccardo Wagner ed i wagneristi (Naples, 1876), which was highly critical of Wagner and his "Music of the Future", but after Wagner visited Naples and mentioned his own admiration for Bellini, Florimo revised and enlarged it (Ancona, 1883), now praising Wagner and only criticizing Wagner's most radical disciples.

Florimo's biography of Giovanni Battista Pergolesi included many colorful anecdotes that were later revealed as hoaxes, although they furnished material for two operas broadly based on Pergolesi's career.

Florimo died in Naples. His will donated to the Naples Conservatory thirty-seven volumes of correspondence, a rich source of material that has not yet been fully exploited; among these documents are some which reveal Florimo's own published fabrications.
