= Ivo Vinco =

Italian bass

- Ivo Vinco (photo with dedication)
- Occupation: opera singer

Ivo Vinco (8 November 1927 – 8 June 2014) was an Italian bass opera singer who enjoyed a successful international career.

Born in Bosco Chiesanuova, Vinco first studied at the Liceo Musicale in Verona with Madama Zilotti, then at the opera school of the Teatro alla Scala in Milan with Ettore Campogalliani. He made his professional debut in Verona, as Ramfis in Aida, in 1954. He quickly sang all over Italy (Milan, Rome, Naples, Turin, Venice, Bologna, Palermo, Parma, Florence et al.).

He began an international career which took him to Vienna, Munich, Berlin, Hamburg, Moscow, Paris, Monte Carlo, Barcelona, Lisbon, Mexico City, Buenos Aires, San Francisco, Chicago and New York, where he made his debut at the Metropolitan Opera in 1969. During the 1962-63 winter season he sang the crucially important role of Oroveso, chief of the Druids, in Bellini's Norma during the I Festival de Festivales de Opera of the Gran Teatro del Liceo in Barcelona. But Vinco sang all the great bass roles of the Italian repertory in addition to Oroveso, including in Raimondo, Sparafucile, Ferrando, Fiesco, Padre Guardiano, Gran Inquisitore and Alvise, and can be heard in a number of complete Italian opera recordings.

== Personal life ==
He was married for many years to mezzo-soprano Fiorenza Cossotto, with whom he had a son, Roberto.
