= 1824 in literature =

This article contains information about the literary events and publications of 1824.

== Events ==
- January
  - The British periodicals The Children's Friend and The Child's Companion both publish their first issues. The Children's Friend was founded by the Reverend William Carus Wilson (1791–1859). Especially up to the turn of the century, The Children's Friend was essentially a religious work, promoting a "grim morality", and encouraging in its young audience the reading of the Bible, evangelism and charitable works. In its early years, it "inculcate[d] good behaviour by dire warnings of eternal damnation for children struck down by God, without time for repentance, as punishment for their sins."
  - The first issue of a radical quarterly founded by Jeremy Bentham, The Westminster Review, is published in London.It served as the official organ of the Philosophical Radicals. The first edition of the journal (January 1824) featured an article by the Scottish historian and economist James Mill (continued in the second edition by his son John Stuart Mill), which served as a provocative reprobation of a rival, more well-established journal, the Edinburgh Review, castigating it as an organ of the Whig party, and for sharing the latter's propensity for fence-sitting in the aristocratic interest.
- February 9 – Because of dire family financial straits, Charles Dickens, who has just turned 12, begins work in a blacking factory in London. On February 23 his father, John Dickens, is committed to the Marshalsea prison as a debtor.
- February 15 – Lord Byron falls ill at Missolonghi while taking part in the Greek War of Independence. He dies of fever on April 19.
- April – The United States Literary Gazette, a semi-monthly, begins publication. It publishes poetry by Henry Wadsworth Longfellow and William Cullen Bryant, among many others.
- May — "Sketches of the Five American Presidents, and of the Five Presidential Candidates, From the Memoranda of a Traveler," by John Neal, the first work by an American author published in a British literary journal.
- May 7 – The première of Beethoven's Symphony No. 9 (the "Choral") is played at the Theater am Kärntnertor in Vienna. It incorporates a setting of Schiller's "Ode to Joy" (Ode an die Freude, 1785).
- May 17 – The publisher John Murray with five of Lord Byron's friends and executors, decide to destroy the manuscript of Byron's Memoirs (which he has been given to publish), because of scandalous details that would damage Byron's reputation. Opposed only by Thomas Moore, the two volumes are dismembered and burnt in the fireplace at the John Murray (publisher)'s office, 50 Albemarle Street in London.
- June 21 – The Vagrancy Act in England provides for the prosecution of "every Person wilfully exposing to view, in any Street... or public Place, any obscene Print, Picture, or other indecent Exhibition".
- September — The first installment is published of the five-part American Writers series by John Neal, the first history of American literature.
- unknown date – Julia Catherine Beckwith's St. Ursula's Convent or, The Nun of Canada; Containing Scenes from Real Life becomes the first novel published in Canada by a native-born Canadian (anonymously).

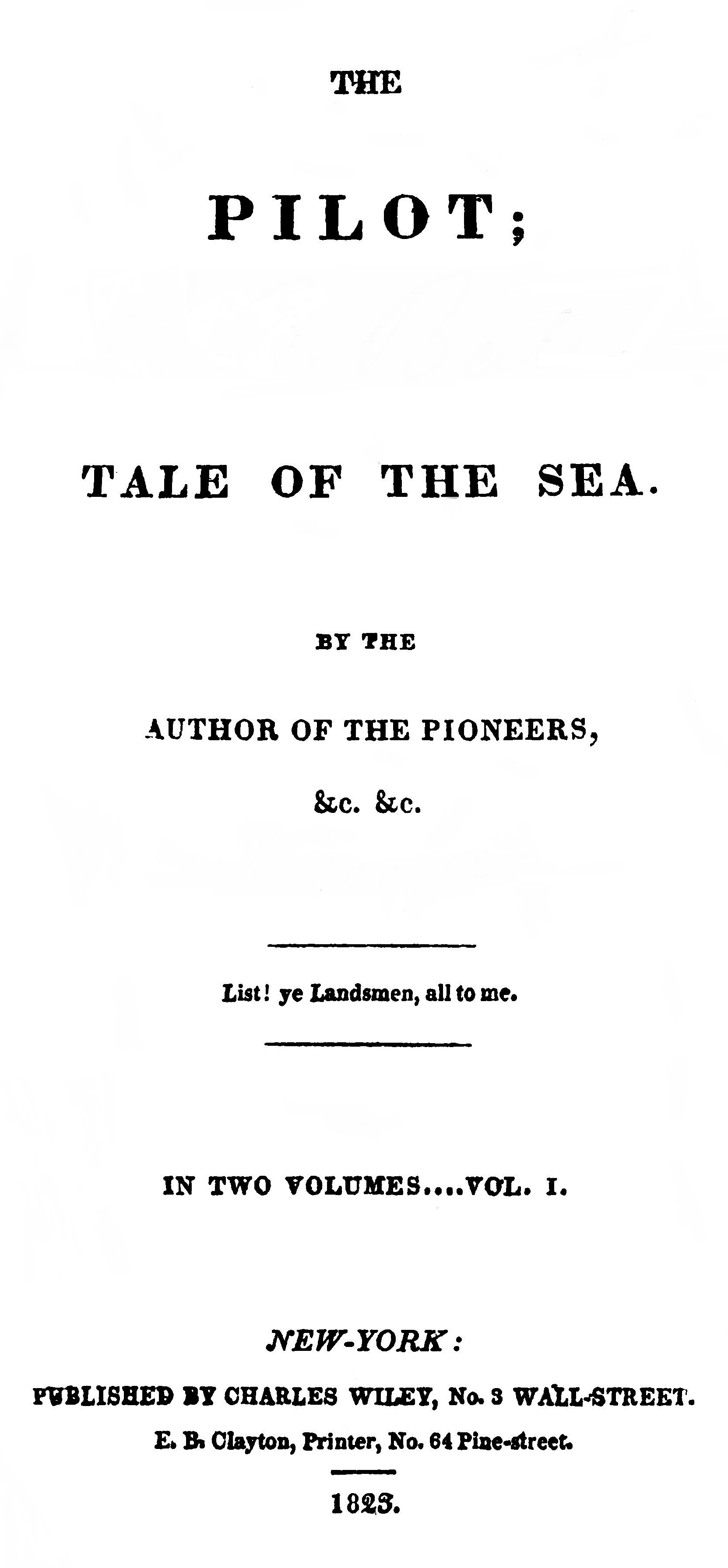
By James Fenimore Cooper. 1st ed. title page dated 1823, published January 1824

== New books ==
=== Fiction ===
- Mary Charlton – The Homicide
- Lydia Maria Child – Hobomok
- James Fenimore Cooper (anonymously) – The Pilot: A Tale of the Sea (published January, dated 1823)
- Susan Ferrier – The Inheritance
- Catherine Gore – Theresa Marchment, or The Maid of Honour
- James Hogg (anonymously) – The Private Memoirs and Confessions of a Justified Sinner
- Washington Irving (as Geoffrey Crayon, Gent.) – Tales of a Traveller
- John Gibson Lockhart – The History of Matthew Wald
- Charles Maturin – The Albigenses
- Mary Russell Mitford – Our Village
- James Justinian Morier – Hajji Baba of Ispahan
- Thomas Moore – Memoirs of Captain Rock
- Regina Marie Roche – The Tradition of the Castle
- Susanna Rowson – Charlotte's Daughter
- Sir Walter Scott (anonymously) – Redgauntlet
- Catharine Maria Sedgwick – Redwood
- Louisa Stanhope – The Siege of Kenilworth
- Anonymous – The Modern Rake

=== Children ===
- William Cardell – The Story of Jack Halyard, the Sailor Boy
- Agnes Strickland
  - The Aviary; Or, An Agreeable Visit. Intended for Children
  - The Use of Sight: Or, I Wish I Were Julia
  - The Little Tradesman, or, A Peep into English Industry

=== Drama ===
- Martin Archer Shee – Alasco
- John Howard Payne – Charles the Second
- Manuel Bretón de los Herreros – Á la vejez viruelas (In Old Age, Chickenpox)

=== Poetry ===
- Thomas Campbell – Theodric; a domestic tale; and other poems
- Letitia Elizabeth Landon – The Improvisatrice, and Other Poems
- Giacomo Leopardi – Canzoni and Versi
- Alexander Pushkin - The Fountain of Bakhchisaray
- Alfred de Vigny – Éloa, ou La sœur des anges

=== Non-fiction ===
- Louisa Gurney Hoare – Friendly Advice on the Management and Education of Children, Addressed to Parents of the Middle and Labouring Classes of Society

== Births ==
- January 7 – Julia Kavanagh, Irish novelist (died 1877)
- January 8 – Wilkie Collins, English mystery novelist (died 1889)
- January 15 – Anna Mary Howitt, English writer, painter and feminist (died 1884)
- January 26 – Katharine Sarah Macquoid, English novelist and travel writer (died 1917)
- March 5 – Lucy Larcom, American author, teacher, and poet (died 1893)
- March 19 – George Murray Smith, English publisher, founder of the Dictionary of National Biography (died 1901)
- April 27 – Edward Bruce Hamley, English military writer, general and politician (died 1893)
- May 19 – William Allingham, Irish poet (died 1889)
- June 20 – Rowena Granice Steele, American journalist, author, editor, publisher, and performer (died 1901)
- July 11 – Mary Charlotte Ward Granniss Webster Billings, American writer, activist, hymn writer, evangelist, and missionary (died 1904)
- July 27 – Alexandre Dumas, fils, French novelist (died 1895)
- August 21 — Caroline Dana Howe, American poet, hymnwriter, and author (died 1907)
- September 15 – A. D. T. Whitney, American poet and girls' writer (died 1906)
- October 18 – Juan Valera y Alcalá-Galiano, Spanish realist novelist (died 1905)
- November 8 – Annie Chambers Ketchum (religious name, Sister Amabilis), American author, educator, and lecturer (died 1904)
- December 10 – George MacDonald, Scottish author, poet and Christian minister (died 1905)

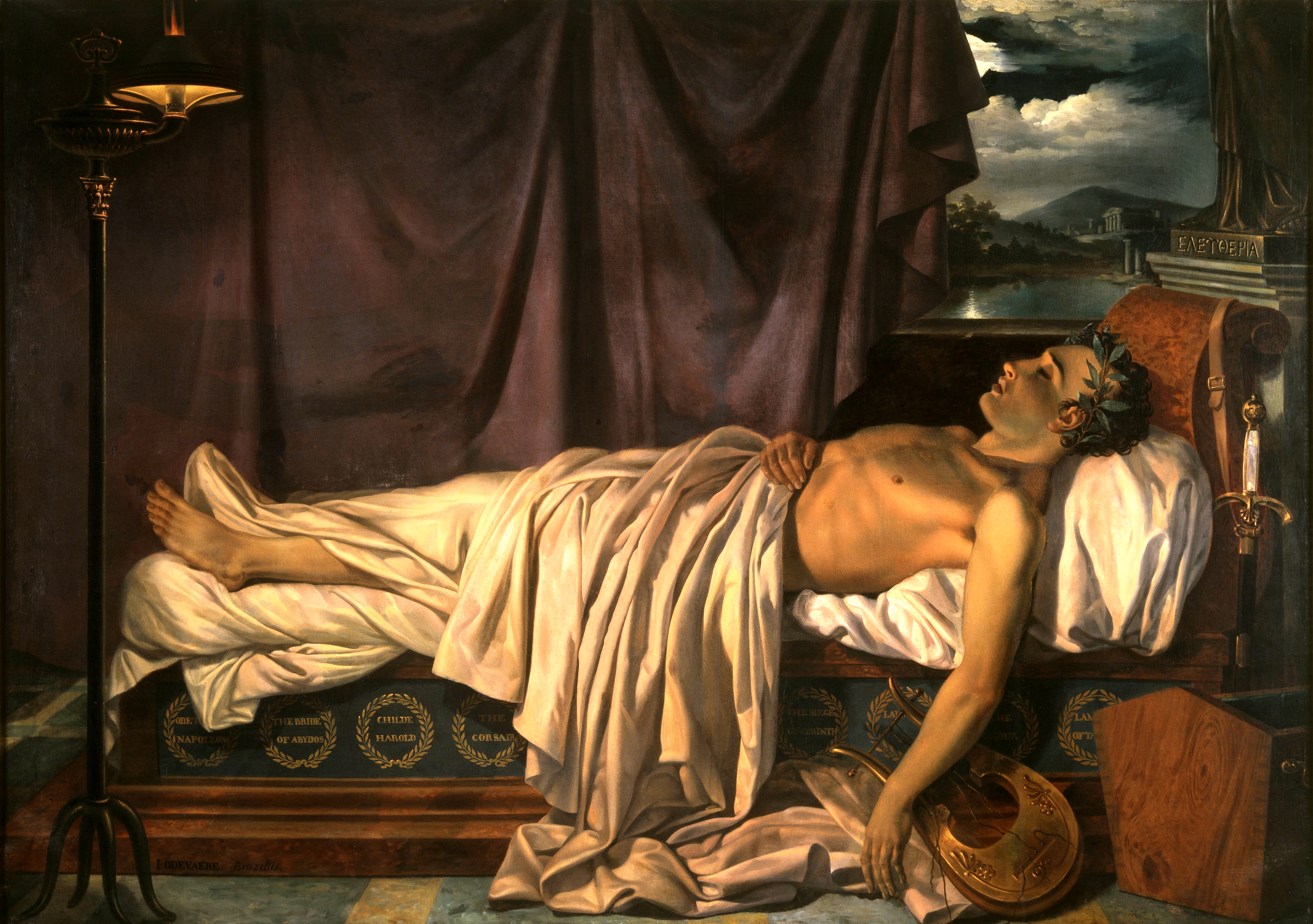
Lord Byron on his deathbed as depicted by Joseph Denis Odevaere c.1826

== Deaths ==
- January 28 – John Larpent, English theatre censor (born 1741)
- March 2 – Susanna Rowson, American novelist, poet and playwright (born 1762)
- April 13 – Jane Taylor, English poet and novelist (born 1783)
- April 19 – Lord Byron, English Romantic poet (born 1788)
- September 23 – John Cartwright, English political reformer (born 1740)
- October 30 – Charles Maturin, Irish playwright, novelist and cleric (born 1782)
- November 23 – Matthäus Casimir von Collin, Austrian poet and dramatist (born 1779)

== Awards ==
- March – Samuel Taylor Coleridge elected Fellow of the Royal Society of Literature
- Chancellor's Gold Medal – Winthrop Mackworth Praed
- Newdigate Prize – John Thomas Hope
