= Il pirata =

Opera by Vincenzo Bellini

- Opera by Vincenzo Bellini
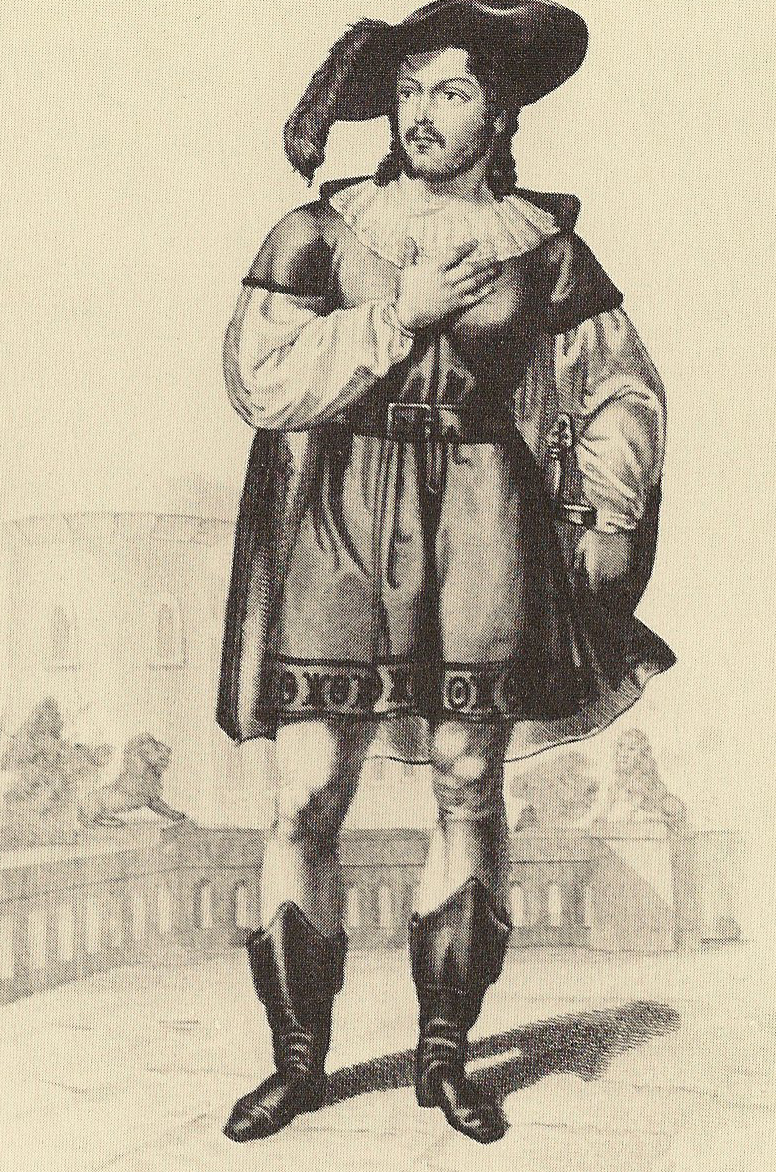
- Rubini as Gualtiero in the premiere production
- Librettist: Felice Romani
- Language: Italian
- Based on: Bertram, or The Castle of St. Aldobrand by Charles Maturin
- Premiere: 27 October 1827; Teatro alla Scala, Milan

Il pirata (The Pirate) is an opera in two acts by Vincenzo Bellini with an Italian libretto by Felice Romani, which was based on a three-act mélodrame from 1826: Bertram, ou le Pirate (Bertram, or The Pirate) by Charles Nodier and Isidore Justin Séverin Taylor. This play was itself based upon a French translation of the five-act verse tragedy Bertram, or The Castle of St. Aldobrand by Charles Maturin which appeared in London in 1816.

The original play has been compared with Bellini's opera and the influence of Il pirata on Gaetano Donizetti's Lucia di Lammermoor has been noted. Also, Bellini's recycling of his own music in this opera has been analyzed, as well as his utilizing "a more self-consciously innovative compositional style" and participating more in work on the libretto, as compared with prior efforts where he was more deferential to the librettists chosen by the Naples opera management and the corresponding texts. In addition, 19th-century commentary refers to the musical influence of Il pirata on the early Richard Wagner opera Das Liebesverbot.

== Composition history ==
=== Bellini in Milan ===
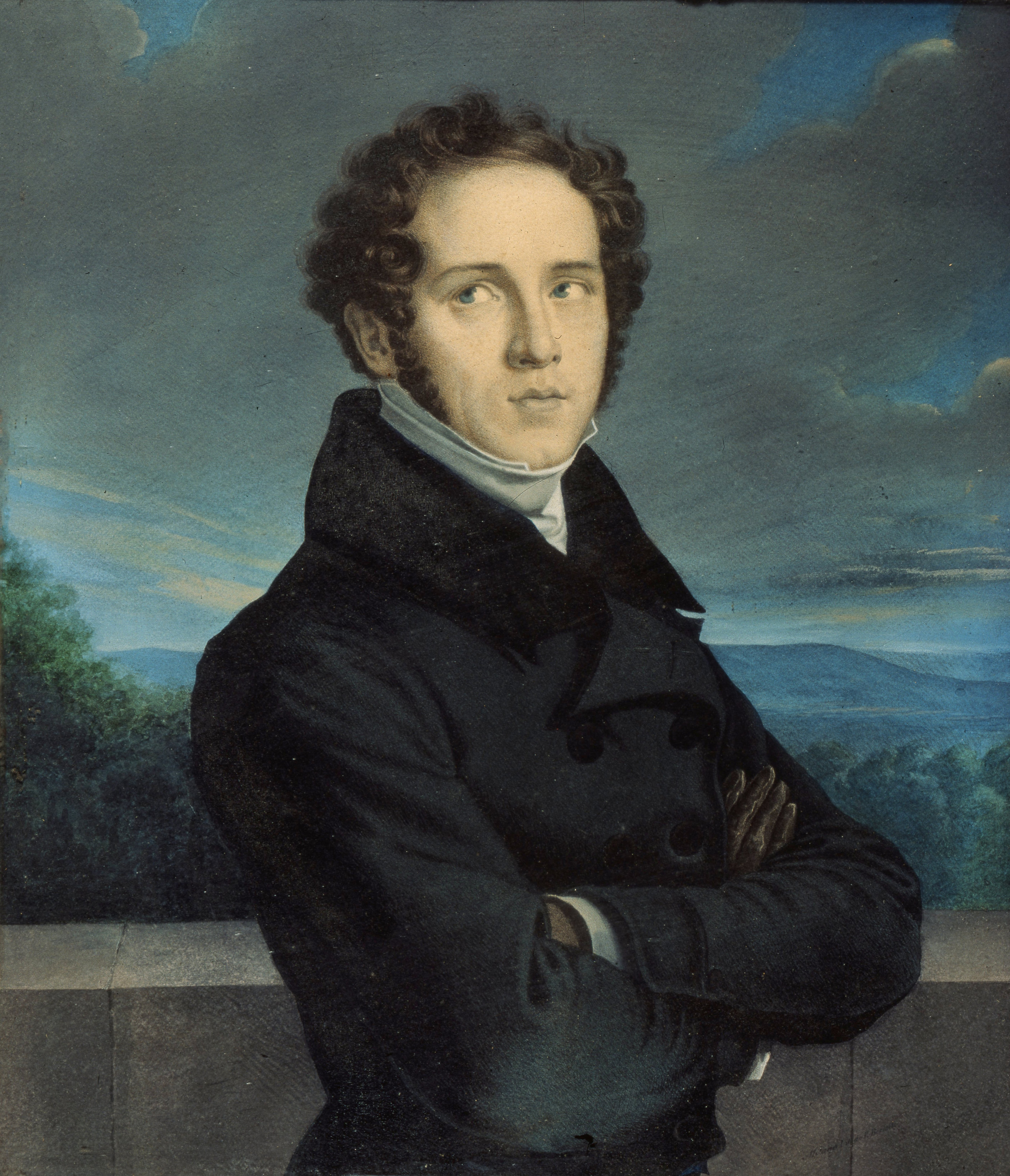
Vincenzo Bellini, painted by Carlo Arienti before 1827

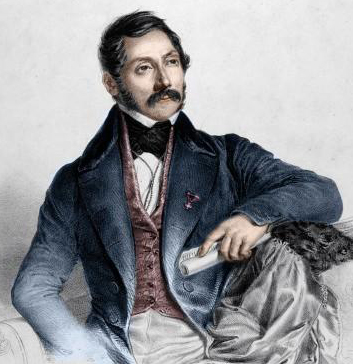
Librettist Felice Romani

Bellini spent 1827 to 1833 mostly in Milan, never holding any official position within an opera company and living solely from the income produced from his compositions, for which he was able to ask higher than usual fees.

Upon his arrival, he met Antonio Villa of La Scala and composer Saverio Mercadante whose new opera, Il Montanaro was in rehearsal. The latter introduced him to Francesco and Marianna Pollini (an older couple, the husband a retired professor of piano, the wife a better-than-amateur musician) who immediately took the young man under their wing.

In addition, Bellini was introduced to the librettist Felice Romani, who proposed the subject of the composer's first project, Il pirata, to which the young man willingly agreed, especially after he realised that the story "provided several passionate and dramatic situations.. [and]..that such Romantic characters were then an innovation on the operatic stage." From that time forward, there began a strong professional relationship with Romani; he became Bellini's primary creative partner, providing the librettos for six of Bellini's operas which followed, the result being that "no other Italian opera composer of the time showed such an attachment to a single librettist". Although Romani was known to treat composers poorly, he evidently had great respect for Bellini, even acceding to his requests for revisions. For his part, Bellini admired "the sonorous and elegance of the poet's verses"

=== Creating Il pirata ===
The collaboration began in May 1827 and, by August, the music was being written. By then, the composer was aware that he was to write music for his favourite tenor Giovanni Battista Rubini and the soprano was to be Henriette Méric-Lalande. Both singers had starred in Bianca e Fernando in the original 1826 production. The strong cast also included Antonio Tamburini, a major bass-baritone of the time.

But rehearsals did not progress without some difficulties, as both Weinstock and Galatopoulos recount: it appears that Bellini found Rubini, while singing beautifully, to be lacking expressiveness: he was urged to "throw yourself with all your soul into the character you are representing" and to use [your] body, "to accompany your singing with gestures", as well as to act with [your] voice. But it seems that Bellini's exhortations bore fruit, based on his own account of the audience's reactions to the first performance, as well as the reaction of Milan's Gazzetta privilegiata of 2 December which noted that this opera "introduced us to Rubini's dual personality as a singer and actor". The reviewer continued to declare that this duality had never been expressed in other operas in which he had performed.

== Performance history ==
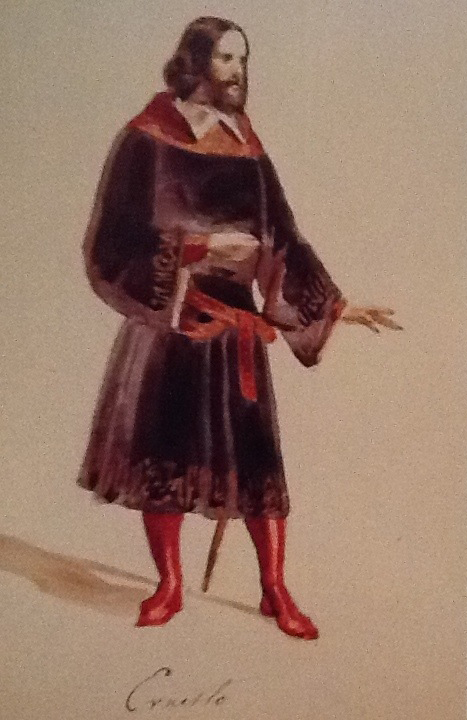
Tamburini as Ernesto in Il pirata 1827

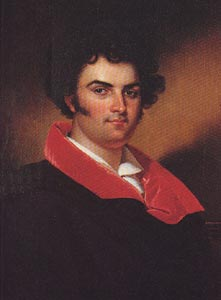
Tenor Giovanni Battista Rubini sang Gualtiero

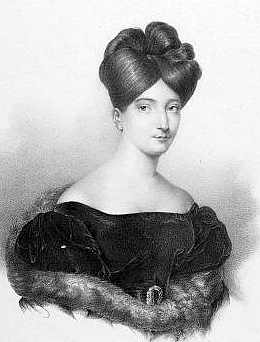
Soprano Henriette Méric-Lalande sang Imogene

=== 19th century ===
The premiere, given on 27 October 1827, was "an immediate and then an increasing, success. By Sunday, December 2, when the season ended, it had been sung to fifteen full houses". For Rubini, "it marked the defining performance for the tenor", and the newspaper reviews which followed all agreed with the composer's own assessment.

After its Milanese debut, the opera received very successful performances in Vienna in February 1828 and also in Naples three months later. Both productions starred Rubini, Tamburini, and—in the role of Imogene—Rubini's wife, Adelaide Comelli-Rubini, about whom Bellini had initial misgivings, although it appears that she acquitted herself very well. By this time, Bellini had begun to achieve international fame. It was back in Milan in the summer of 1829 for 24 performances. Throughout 1830, the opera was given in Venice (January), Vicenza (summer), Bologna (October), and Trieste in December, then Messina in 1831. When Bellini was in Sicily in February 1832, it was also given in Messina, and thereafter spread rapidly around Italy.

Il pirata was given outside Italy for the first time in February 1828. Herbert Weinstock notes that in many of its presentations throughout Europe and North America, it was the first Bellini opera to be heard. These include the first UK performance in April 1830 and the first in the USA in December 1832.

=== 20th century and beyond ===
Weinstock recounts that the opera was given on 1 January 1935 in Rome to commemorate the 100th anniversary of the composer's death. At the Teatro Massimo Bellini in Catania it was staged in November 1951 under Tullio Serafin as well at the Teatro Massimo in Palermo in January 1958, a production which was given a few months later at La Scala and which "became the most notable of modern revivals of Il pirata...headed by Maria Meneghini Callas and Franco Corelli."

In a concert performances, Callas repeated her Imogene at New York's Carnegie Hall in January 1959, while other concert versions were given by Aprile Millo on 6 March 1989 by Opera Orchestra of New York and by Nelly Miricioiu at the Concertgebouw on 20 September 2003.

It was staged by the Maggio Musicale Fiorentino in June 1967 with Montserrat Caballé and, again with Caballé, both in London in concert form in June 1969 and staged in Cincinnati in the following month. The soprano continued to appear in the role in December 1970 at the Gran Teatre del Liceu and recorded it in Rome that year.

The Wexford Festival staged it in January 1973 and it was presented by the Festival della Valle d'Itria in Martina Franca in July 1987. Nello Santi led performances at the Zürich Opera House in September 1992 with Mara Zampieri. A video recording exists of a performance in Saint-Etienne in May 1993 with Lucia Aliberti. Mariella Devia sang the soprano role at the Teatro delle Muse in Ancona in January 2007.

Renée Fleming sang Imogene in a concert version at Théâtre du Châtelet in Paris on 16 May 2002 before taking the role to the Metropolitan Opera, the company giving its first-ever performances of the opera from late October 2002 into February 2003. A planned revival and HD broadcast of the Met's production scheduled for the spring of 2021, intended to star Javier Camarena and Diana Damrau, was cancelled due to the COVID-19 pandemic.

In 2018, the soprano Sonya Yoncheva revived the piece as Imogene at the Teatro alla Scala in the first performances after the legendary 1958 performances starring Maria Callas in the same part, reprising it at the Teatro Real of Madrid in 2019.

The work was performed in Naples for the first time since 1834 at the Teatro di San Carlo in January, 2021, with Sondra Radvanovsky as Imogene. Due to Covid-19 restrictions, there was no audience in the theater for this concert performance. The orchestra and chorus were more widely spaced than usual and some performers wore masks. The performance was video-recorded and streamed.

== Roles ==
Role	Voice type	Premiere cast, 27 October 1827 (Conductor: – )
Ernesto, Duke of Caldora	baritone	Antonio Tamburini
Imogene, his wife	soprano	Henriette Méric-Lalande
Gualtiero, former Count of Montalto	tenor	Giovanni Rubini
Itulbo, Gualtiero's lieutenant	tenor	Lorenzo Lombardi
Goffredo, a hermit, once tutor to Gualtiero	bass	Pietro Ansilioni
Adele, Imogene's companion	soprano	Marietta Sacchi
A little boy, son to Imogene and Ernesto	silent	
Fishermen and women, pirates, knights, ladies

== Synopsis ==
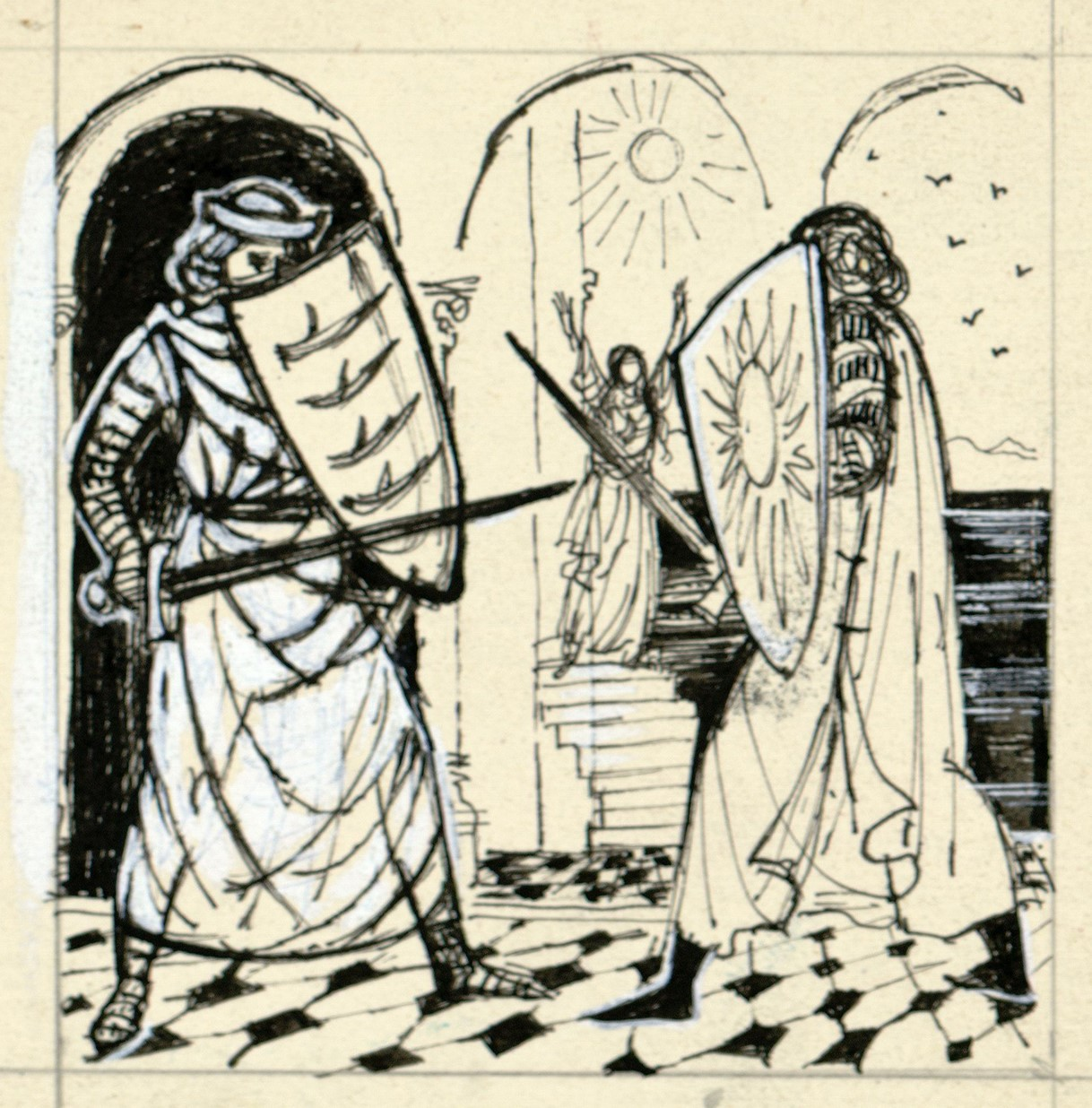
Disegno per copertina di libretto, drawing for Il pirata (undated).

Place: Sicily
Time: 13th century

=== Act 1 ===
Scene 1: The seashore near Caldora Castle

On a stormy sea-shore, fishermen watch a ship foundering in a huge storm. They help the crew come ashore and among the survivors is Gualtiero, who recognises his old tutor Goffredo, now appearing dressed as a hermit. He explains that he has lost everything. Gualtiero tells him that, in spite of his hatred for his persecutor Ernesto, he drew strength from his continuing love for Imogene. (Cavatina: Nel furor delle tempeste / "In the fury of the storm / in the slaughter of a pirate's life / that adored image appears in my thoughts"). When the fishermen arrive to inform both men that the noble lady who lives close by is coming to help the shipwrecked men, Gualtiero is urged to hide himself since he will be alone among enemies. He enters Goffredo's hut.

It is Imogene who arrives to offer hospitality to the shipwrecked strangers, but Gualtiero does not reveal himself. She tells her companion Adele that she dreamed that he had been killed by her husband. (Cavatina: Lo sognai ferito, esangue / "My duty is the compassion / that sends me to the aid of strangers"). From what Itulbo has told her about the pirate ship, she assumes that he is dead. When he comes out of the hut, Gualtiero recognises her, but the hermit makes him re-enter. Imogene is urged to return to the castle, but to herself, she imagines that she sees Gualtiero everywhere she looks. (Cabaletta: Sventurata, anch'io deliro / "Hapless one, I too am delirious / obsessed by a vain love").

Scene 2: The Castle terrace at night

At night, Itulbo warns the strangers not to reveal that they are the pirates who have been pursued by Ernesto. Meanwhile, Imogene is strangely fascinated by the mysterious stranger who enters covered in a cloak. He soon reveals to her who he really is. Gualtiero learns that she had married Ernesto only because he had threatened her father's life. (Extended duet, first Gualtiero: Pietosa al padre! e meco / eri si cruda intanto! / "Pity for your father! But you / were so cruel to me! / And I, deceived and blind, lived, / lived for you alone!"; then Imogene: Ah! qui d'un padre antico / tu non tremasti accanto / "Ah, you never trembled / for an aged father). When Imogene's ladies bring her son into the room, he is angry and almost removes his dagger from his belt, before handing the boy back. He then leaves.

Scene 3: The Castle grounds

Ernesto and his men celebrate victory over the pirates (Cavatina: Sì, vincemmo, e il pregio io sento / "Yes, we conquered and I feel proud of such a noble victory"), but he is annoyed that Imogene is not celebrating too. He asks her if she has found out who the shipwrecked men are, telling her that he expects to question the hermit and the man who is described by the hermit as their leader: Itulbo. Itulbo describes himself as being from Liguria and, upon questioning him, Ernesto recognises by his dress and accent that he is not from the local area. He continues to press Itulbo on the whereabouts of Gualtiero, knowing that pirates have come from Ligurian shores; he is reluctant to accept the group until they can provide greater proof of who they are. Meanwhile, they must remain as prisoners. Beginning with a duet, which initially includes Gualtiero, who declares his readiness to fight, Ernesto somewhat suspicious, Imogene and Adele in anguish, then the hermit (Goffredo) and the women, it extends to include all the principals who express their conflicting emotions, though the hermit manages to restrain Gualtiero from giving his identity away.

=== Act 2 ===
Scene 1: The entrance to Imogene's apartments

Adele tells Imogene that Gualtiero wishes to see her before he leaves. She is reluctant, but she recognises that she must do it. As she is about to leave, Ernesto arrives and accuses Imogene of being unfaithful to him: (Ernesto, recitative: Arresta / Ognor mi fuggi / "Stay! You continually avoid me! Now the time has come for me to have you at my side"; then duet.) She defends herself by saying that her continuing love for Gualtiero is based solely on her remembrance of their past encounters. Ernesto is inclined to take her word for it, but, when a message is delivered in which he is told that Gualtiero is being sheltered in his own castle, he is consumed by rage, demands to know where his enemy is, and then storms out. Imogene follows.

Scene 2: The Castle terrace

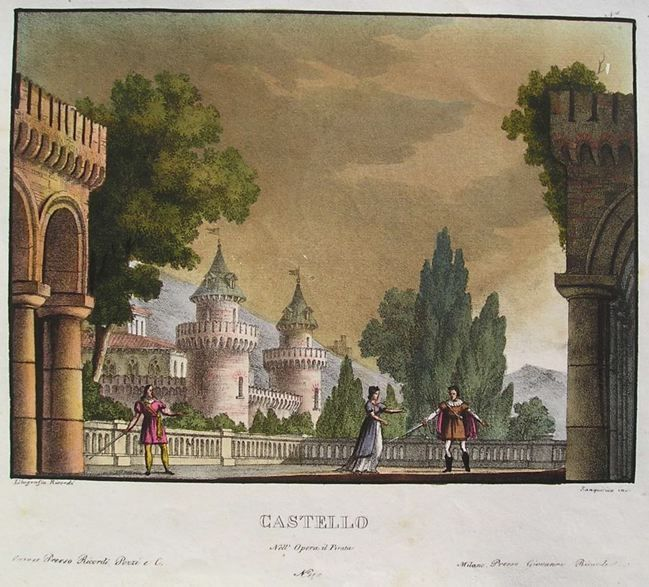
Alessandro Sanquirico's set design for act 2, scene 2

Gualtiero and Itulbo meet on the terrace at daybreak, the latter encouraging him to flee with all his men. But Gualtiero stands firm and, as Itulbo leaves, Imogene comes onto the terrace. She urges him to be brief, to leave immediately, but he tries to comfort her before they part (Duet: Per noi tranquillo un porto / l'immenso mare avrà / "For us the vast sea / will have a calm port") at the same time as he urges her to come with him to the safety of one of his two ships which have arrived. But she tries to leave, encouraging him to forgive and forget. Their acceptance of the situation alternates with passionate declarations of love, and Ernesto, arriving, conceals himself and overhears the end of their duet. As the couple part, Ernesto reveals himself, but Imogene rushes between them, trying to convince Gualtiero to flee. Defiant, he ignores her, proclaiming to Ernesto that his thirst for his blood has not diminished over ten years. The two men demand blood and, in a trio finale as they exit, they continue in this vein while Imogene pleads that they kill her. The two men depart to fight, and Imogene follows.

Scene 3: The courtyard of the Castle

A funeral march is heard as Ernesto's knights enter followed by Adele and the ladies. All grieve over Ernesto's death at the hands of "a traitor, a vile pirate". Gualtiero, to the amazement of Ernesto's retainers, gives himself up to the knights and, as he is taken away, he prays that Imogene may forgive him (Tu vedrai la sventurata / "You will see the unhappy lady / whom I caused so many tears / and tell her if I wronged her / I also knew how to avenge her"). He believes his memory won't be hated forever (Ma non fia sempre odiata / But it won't always be hated). She appears in a state of anguish and sees visions of her dead husband and her son (Col sorriso d'innocenza ... Oh sole, ti vela di tenebre oscure / "With the smile of innocence / with the glance of love / pray speak to your father of clemency and pardon"). Meanwhile, from the Council chamber, the Knights condemn Gualtiero to death and, as the scaffold is erected, Imogene is raving: (Finale: Oh, sole! ti vela / "Oh sun, veil yourself / in darkest gloom / hide the cruel axe / from my sight"). Her ladies lead Imogene from the courtyard.

== Recordings ==
=== Audio ===
Year	Cast: (Imogene, Gualtiero, Ernesto, Goffredo)	Conductor, Opera house and orchestra	Label
1959	Maria Callas, Pier Miranda Ferraro, Constantino Ego, Chester Watson	Nicola Rescigno, American Opera Society Orchestra and Chorus (Recording of a concert performance in January)	CD: EMI Classics; Cat: D232361
1967	Montserrat Caballé, Flaviano Labò, Piero Cappuccilli, Giuseppe Baratti	Franco Capuana, Orchestra of the Florence May Festival	CD: Opera d'Oro; Cat: B00000FBRF
1970	Montserrat Caballé, Bernabé Martí, Piero Cappuccilli, Ruggero Raimondi	Gianandrea Gavazzeni, Radiotelevisione Italiana Orchestra and Chorus	CD: EMI Classics; Cat: 7243 567121 (Re-issued 2005)
1994	Lucia Aliberti, Stuart Neill, Roberto Frontali, Kelly Anderson	Marcello Viotti, Deutsche Oper Berlin Orchestra	CD: Berlin Classics; Cat: B0000035MR
2003	Renée Fleming, Marcello Giordani, Dwayne Croft, Tigran Martirossian	Bruno Campanella, Metropolitan Opera Orchestra and Chorus (Recorded live, 8 February)	CD: Celestial Audio; Cat: CA 309 B0000035MR; Streaming audio: Met Opera on Demand
2010	Carmen Giannattasio, José Bros, Ludovic Tézier, Brindley Sherratt	David Parry, London Philharmonic Orchestra and the Geoffrey Mitchell Choir, (Recorded at Henry Wood Hall, London, March/April)	CD: Opera Rara, Cat: ORC45
2021	Marina Rebeka, Javier Camarena, Franco Vassallo, Antonio Di Matteo	Fabrizio Maria Carminati, Orchestra and Chorus of the Teatro Massimo Bellini, Catania	CD: Prima Classic; Cat: PRIMA010

=== Video ===
Year	Cast: (Imogene, Gualtiero, Ernesto, Goffredo)	Conductor, Opera house and orchestra	Label
1987	Lucia Aliberti, Giuseppe Morino, Giorgio Surjan, Pietro Spagnoli	Alberto Zedda, Orchestra Internazionale d'Italia Opera, Coro del Teatro Petruzzelli di Bari (Recorded live, July, Festival di Martina Franca)	DVD: House of Duluth
2019	Sonya Yoncheva, Javier Camarena, George Petean, Felipe Bou	Maurizio Benini, Chorus and Orchestra of the Teatro Real, Madrid (Recorded live; stage director: Emilio Sagi)	Full HD video: Teatro Real

== Variations by other composers ==
Other composers have written variations on Ma Non Fia Sempre Odiata, the aria in the final scene. In 1837 Clara Schumann wrote Variations de concert sur la cavatine du Pirate de Bellini for solo piano. Pietro Pettoletti wrote Variations sur la Cavatine favorite de l'opéra 'Le Pirata' de Bellini op. 26 for solo guitar.
