= Manuel (play) =

1817 play

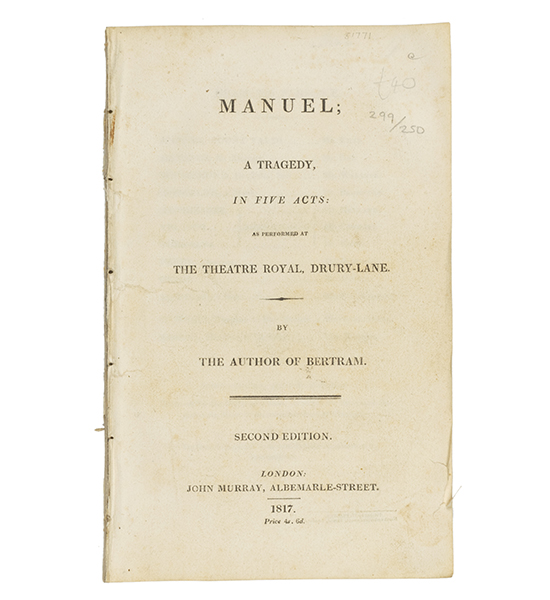
- Original language: English
- Written by: Charles Maturin
- Genre: Historical tragedy
- Setting: Andalusia, 13th century

Premiere
- Date: 8 March 1817
- Place: Theatre Royal, Drury Lane, London

Manuel is an 1817 tragedy by the Irish writer Charles Maturin. It premiered at the Theatre Royal, Drury Lane in London on 8 March 1817. The original cast included Edmund Kean as Manuel, Count Valdi, Alexander Rae as De Zelos, James William Wallack as Torrismond, Charles Holland as Mendizabel, Thomas Cooke as Almorad, John Powell as Guide and Margaret Somerville as Victoria. The published work is dedicated to the writer Walter Scott. It takes place in the wake of the Battle of Las Navas de Tolosa in Spain. It failed to recapture the success of his debut play Bertram of the previous year, despite both starring Kean.

== Bibliography ==
- Greene, John C. Theatre in Dublin, 1745-1820: A Calendar of Performances, Volume 6. Lexington Books, 2011.
- Murray, Christopher John. Encyclopedia of the Romantic Era, 1760-1850, Volume 2. Taylor & Francis, 2004.
- Nicoll, Allardyce. A History of Early Nineteenth Century Drama 1800-1850. Cambridge University Press, 1930.
