= Palazzo Manganelli, Catania =

Coordinates: 37.5053°N 15.0881°E

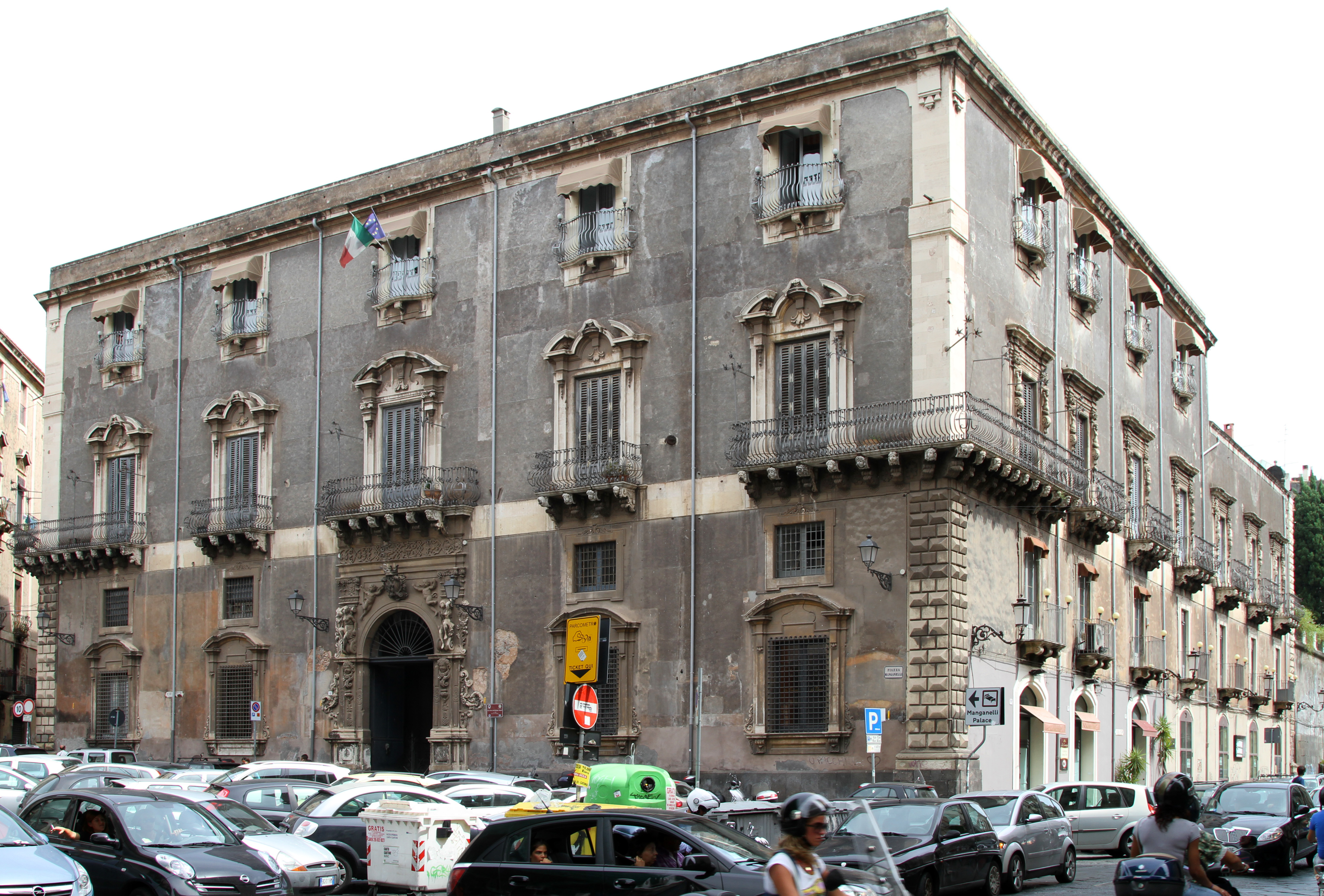
View of facade on Piazza Manganelli

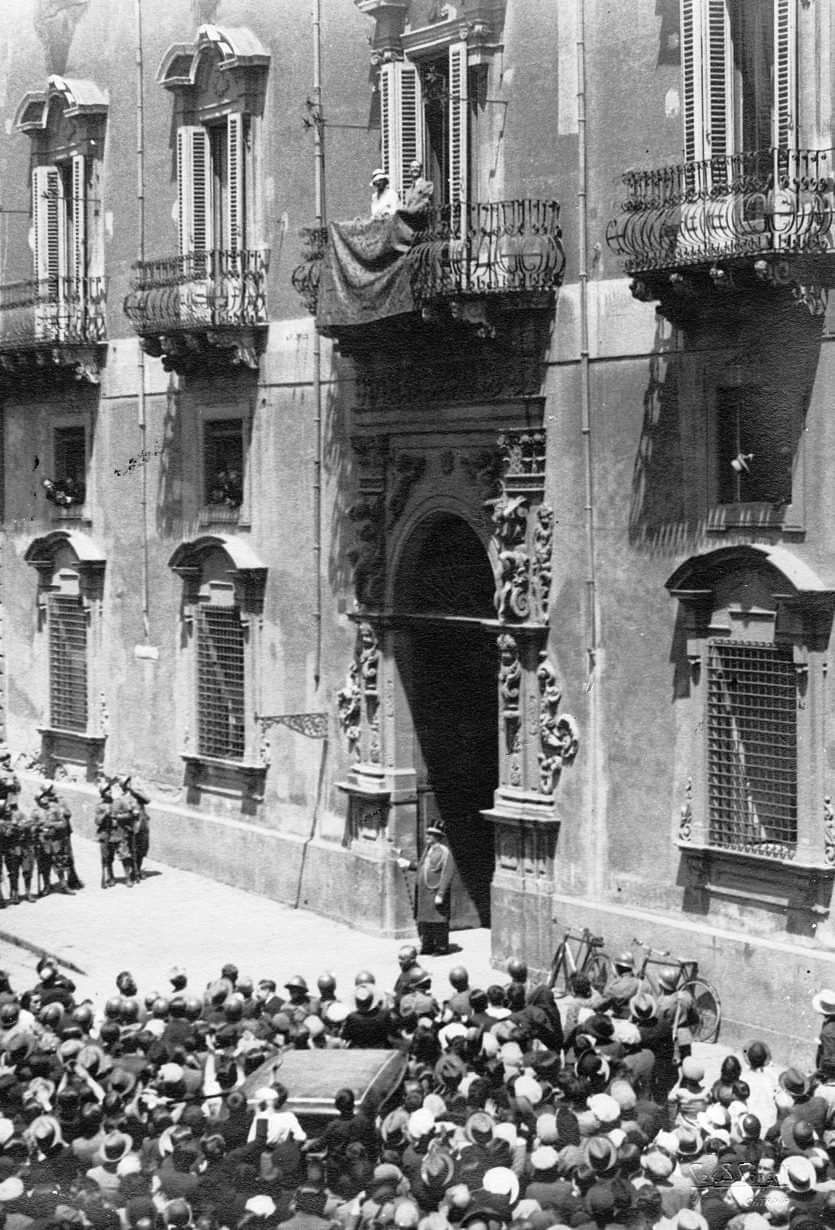
Umberto II di Savoia and his wife Marie-José of Belgium, greetings the crowd (May 1932).

The Palazzo Manganelli is a Baroque monumental palace located in Piazza Manganelli, in the center of the city of Catania, region of Sicily, southern Italy. It is still lived in by heirs of the family, and also houses a hotel. The busy piazza serves mainly as a parking lot; at the north is a civic art gallery, housed in the former church of San Michele Minore. To the south, across Via Antonino di Sangiuliano stands the Teatro Sangiorgi. At one time, a building here housed the Istituto per la Educazione delle Fanciulle (Institute for education of Girls).

== History and description ==
A palace at the site was built by the noble Tornambene family in the 15th century. It was only two stories high. In 1505, it was sold to the Baron of Sigona, Alvaro Paternò and his wife Isabella. Like nearly all construction in Catania, it was mostly destroyed by the 1693 earthquake although the palace had been built against the medieval walls of the town, that withstood the tremor and can still be seen along via Santa Teresa. Antonio Paternò, 6th Baron of Manganelli, commissioned the construction of a new palace from Alonzo Di Benedetto and Felice Palazzotto.

In 1837, a severe cholera outbreak in Catania caused a short rebellion by the populace, who protested in front of this palace, home of the then Catanian governor, the prince of Manganelli. They demanded the appointment of a new sanitary commission. In 1860, the Garibaldini, during their successful conquest of the Neapolitan kingdom, sacked the palace, destroying or looting the contents. In 1873, the level of via Sangiuliano was lowered, requiring further reconstruction, including the addition of the third floor. In the 1870s, the piano nobile was decorated with frescoes by Giuseppe Sciuti and Ernesto Bellandi, working on commission from Princess Angela Paternò di Manganelli Torresi.

In the 20th-century, the palace was inherited by the Borghese family, upon the marriage of Donna Angela Paternò, 7th Princess of Sperlinga of Manganelli, to Don Flavio Prince Borghese, 12th prince of Sulmona. The descendants still live in parts of the palace.

The facade has a playful decorative program, with brackets for the balconies decorated with faces. The portal is profusely decorated with female atlantids and cherubic figures flanking a crowned coat of arms. Also notable in the palace is the pocket garden to the rear (East) of the facade, entered from the palace. The crowded center of Catania has little such greenery. It occupies two levels and has fountains and a nymphaeum. Some of the greenery can be viewed spilling over the old city walls on Via Santa Teresa.
