= Leixlip Castle =

1824 short story

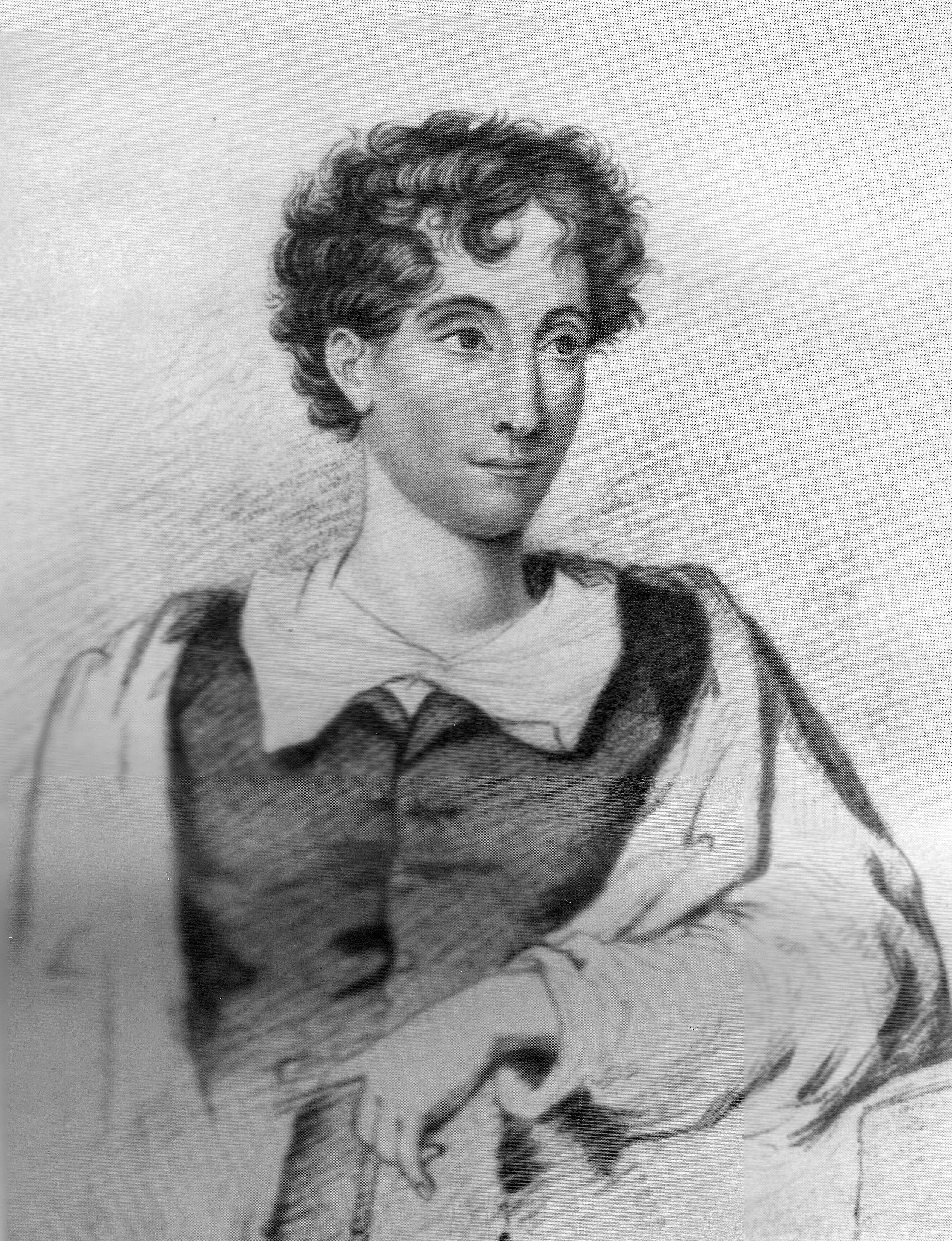
- Charles Maturin.
- Author: Charles Maturin
- Language: English
- Genre: Gothic
- Publication date: 1824
- Publication place: United Kingdom
- Media type: Print

Leixlip Castle is an 1824 short story by the Irish writer Charles Maturin. His final work, it was published posthumously. Maturin's earlier novels had been heavily Gothic in tone. With his previous work The Albigenses (1824) he moved towards historical stories in the style of Walter Scott's popular Waverley novels. In Leixlip Castle he combined both elements in a supernatural story concerning Ireland in the early 18th century. It should not be confused with a novel of the same title by M.L. O'Byrne published in 1883.

== Synopsis ==
In 1720 Jacobite supporter Sir Redmond Blayney, tired of the boasts of his Whig about the Siege of Derry, moves from the North of Ireland to rent Leixlip Castle in County Kildare outside Dublin. Over the following years his three daughters all begin suffering from supernatural and tragic events.

== Bibliography ==
- Hayley, Barbara & Murray, Christopher (ed.) Ireland and France, a Bountiful Friendship: Literature, History, and Ideas : Essays in Honor of Patrick Rafroidi. Rowman & Littlefield, 1992.
- O'Malley, Patrick R. Liffey and Lethe: Paramnesiac History in Nineteenth-century Anglo-Ireland. Oxford University Press, 2017.
- Morin, Christina. Charles Robert Maturin and the haunting of Irish Romantic Fiction. Manchester University Press, 2017.
- Morin, Christina. The Gothic Novel in Ireland, 1760–1829. Manchester University Press, 2018.
- Trumpener, Katie. Bardic Nationalism: The Romantic Novel and the British Empire. Princeton University Press, 2021.
