= Pietro Pettoletti =

Italian composer (c. 1795 – c. 1870)

Pietro Pettoletti (c. 1795 – c. 1870) was a composer of Italian origin. The dates of birth and death are not known. His father Carl Johan (1758–1801) was Kapellmeister in Christiania (Norway). At first he lived in Germany, then, from age 25, in Sweden, where he taught piano and guitar. Subsequently, he moved to Russia, employed by a wealthy landowner to teach guitar to his children. Pettoletti stayed for a long time in Saint Petersburg, where he gained a reputation as concert performer and teacher.

He often performed in duo with his brother Joachim, a violinist in the orchestra of the Italian opera of Saint Petersburg. As guitar virtuoso Pettoletti toured Germany, France, and Russia.

== Works ==
- Six Waltzes op. 1 (Bonn & Cologne, Simrock)
- Mes Souvenirs. Divertissemens op. 6 (Stockholm: Gjöthström & Magnusson)
- Variations sur l'air la Tyrolienne op. 7 (Stockholm: Gjöthström & Magnusson)
- Six Variations faciles op. 8
- Theme with variations op.11a (Mainz: B. Schott's Söhne)
- Divertissement facile op. 11b, for 2 guitars (Copenhagen: Lose)
- Troika op. 14
- Fantaisie op. 15 (Mainz: B. Schott's Söhne)
- Divertissement op. 17
- Fantaisie 'God bless the Tzar!' op. 18
- Fantaisie 'The Red Safran' op. 19
- How have I made you sad? Variations op. 21
- Fantaisie op. 22 (Hamburg: Cranz)
- Vals. Marsch och 2 tema op. 23
- Fantaisie op. 24 (Hamburg: Cranz)
- Variations sur la Cavatine favorite de l'opéra 'Le Pirata' de Bellini op. 26 (Mainz: B. Schott's Söhne)
- Fantaisie sur la 'Dernière pensée de Weber' pour Guitare et Piano op. 28 (Mainz: B. Schott's Söhne)
- Impromptu op. 29
- Duettino pour Guitare et Piano sur un air de la 'Somnambule' de Bellini op. 30 (St. Petersbourg, A. Büttner)
- Fantaisie sur une romance op. 31
- Fantaisie sur une mélodie op. 32
