= Edward Maturin =

Irish born American writer and professor of Greek (1812–1881)

Edward Maturin was born in Dublin, Ireland, on 18 June 1812 and died in New York City on 25 May 1881. He was naturalised as an American and worked as a professor of Greek. His fiction and poetry generally dealt with historical themes, while his work as a Gothic novelist often had an Irish background.

== Life and works ==
The Maturin family was descended from a Huguenot clergyman who fled to Ireland after the revocation of the Edict of Nantes. Edward's father, Reverend Charles Robert Maturin, was curate of St. Peter's church, Dublin, and well known as a preacher, as well as a poet and Gothic novelist. Born the second son, Edward entered Trinity College, Dublin at the age of 15 and graduated at 20. Immediately afterwards he emigrated to the US in 1832 with letters of introduction from the poet Thomas Moore and other Irish writers. Having studied law under Charles O'Conor, he was called to the bar but later became professor of Greek in the College of South Carolina and applied for American naturalisation in 1837. He married Harriet Lord Gailiard in 1842 and had three children by her. In 1848 he returned to New York, where for upwards of thirty years he filled professorships in Greek, Latin and Belles Lettres. His mastery of Greek was such that he was selected in 1850 by the American Bible Union as one of their revisers and worked on the gospel of St. Mark.

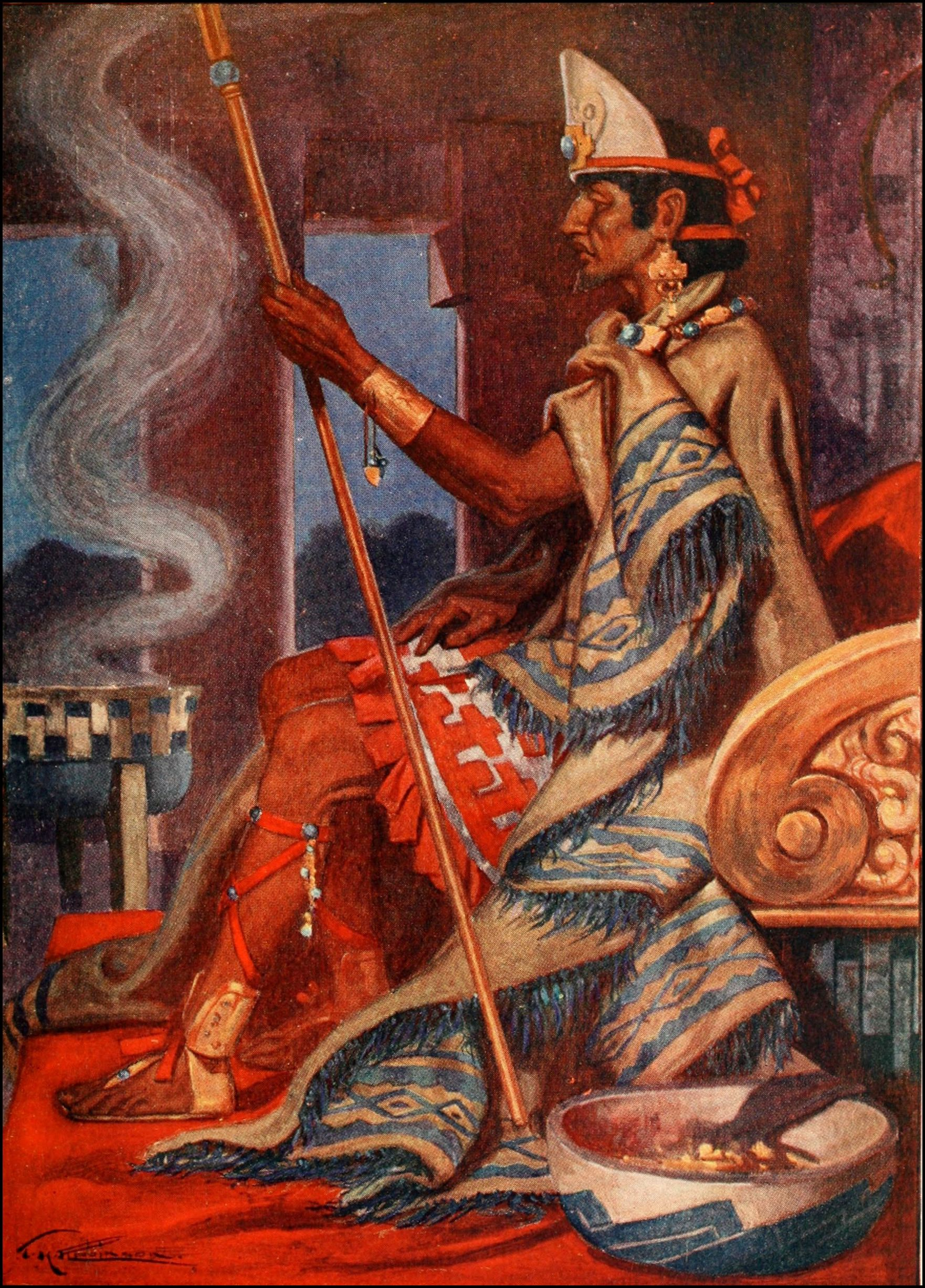
Montezuma, doomed hero of Maturin's first novel, from a children's history book

All Edward Maturin's work was written in the U.S. and for the most part concentrated on historical themes or Irish fantasy. His first book contained the interconnected stories of Sejanus and Other Roman Tales (1839) and was dedicated to Washington Irving. They concern incidents during the reigns of the Roman emperors from Tiberius to Nero; self-consciously literary, the dialogue is written in an imitation of Shakespearean English. This was followed by the two-volume romance, Montezuma, the Last of the Aztecs (1845) and then two works on Spanish themes. The long series of "Spanish Ballads" that originally appeared in the United States Democratic Revue during 1845 were eventually collected with his other poems in Lyrics of Spain and Erin (1850). They were followed by the romance Benjamin, the Jew of Grenada (1847), a story of the fall of the Muslim polities in Spain.

After his move to New York, his prose work became more Gothic. It included The Irish Chieftain, or The Isles of Life and Death (1848) which was later to be dismissed as "a wild story without foundation in history ... melodramatic, sentimental, extravagant", and the two-volume Eva, or the Isles of Life and Death (1848). His later Bianca, a tale of Erin and Italy (1852) was set in more modern times but equally condemned as "an outlandish story, full of murders, characters - mostly illegitimate - with terrible secrets, a duel between brothers, banshees, mysterious lady-prophetesses, fee-faw-fum". A final offering was his four-act play Viola (1858).
