= Bertram (play) =

1816 play

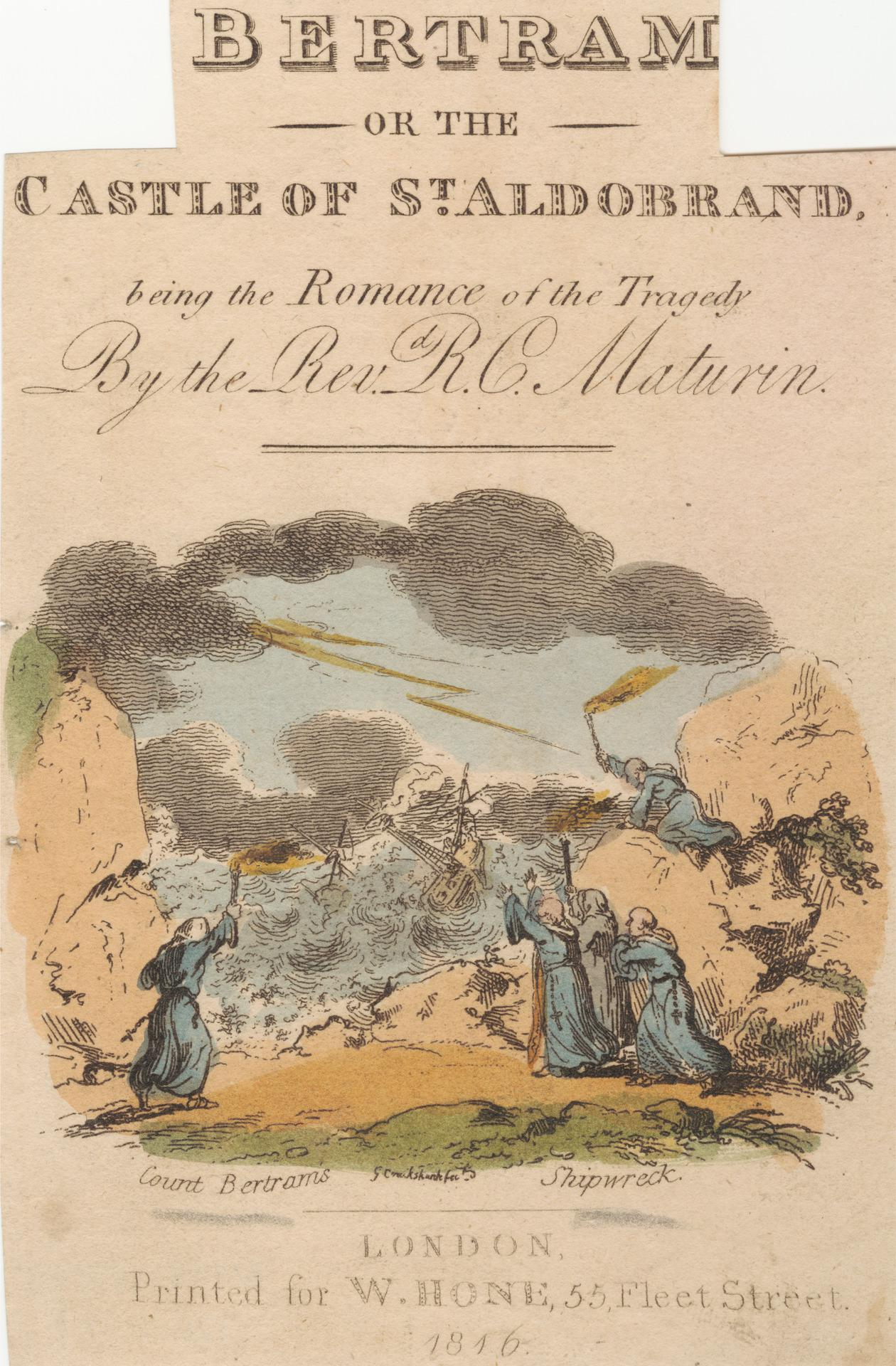
- Original language: English
- Written by: Charles Maturin
- Genre: Tragedy

Premiere
- Date: 9 May 1816
- Place: Theatre Royal, Drury Lane, London

Bertram; or The Castle of St. Aldobrand is an 1816 Gothic tragedy by the Irish writer Charles Maturin, his first and most successful play. It premiered at the Theatre Royal, Drury Lane in London on 9 May 1816. The original cast included Edmund Kean as Bertram, Alexander Pope as St Aldobrand, Charles Holland as Prior of St Anselm, John Powell as Monk, Thomas Cooke as Robber, Margaret Somerville as Imogine and Susan Boyce as Clotilda. The prologue was written by John Hobhouse. The 1827 opera Il pirata composed by Vincenzo Bellini uses a libretto by Felice Romani inspired by Maturin's work. A contemporary discussion of the play is found in Samuel Taylor Coleridge's Biographia Literaria.

== Bibliography ==
- Greene, John C. Theatre in Dublin, 1745-1820: A Calendar of Performances, Volume 6. Lexington Books, 2011.
- Murray, Christopher John. Encyclopedia of the Romantic Era, 1760-1850, Volume 2. Taylor & Francis, 2004.
- Nicoll, Allardyce. A History of Early Nineteenth Century Drama 1800-1850. Cambridge University Press, 1930.
