= Lucia Aliberti =

Italian operatic soprano

- Born: 12 June 1957 (age 68); Messina, Italy
- Occupation: Opera singer (soprano)
- Years active: 1978–present

Lucia Aliberti (born 12 June 1957) is an Italian operatic soprano singer. She performed the bel canto roles of Bellini, Rossini, Donizetti, Verdi, Puccini, Vivaldi, Mercadante and so on.

== Life and career ==
Aliberti was born in Messina (Sicily). She studied piano, composition, conducting, and singing at the Conservatory, where she graduated with a diploma with full marks very young. She then completed her studies in Rome with Maestro Luigi Ricci and continued her study with Alfredo Kraus. Musician and composer, while studying singing, she was also studying the piano and other musical instruments (guitar, accordion, violin, mandolin). She has composed many pieces for piano, clarinet, flute and singing.

She began her artistic career in Spoleto at the Festival dei Due Mondi, under the direction of Gian Carlo Menotti. A lyric-dramatic soprano with agility, Aliberti graduated very young from the conservatory with honours. She studied with Luigi Ricci in Rome, Alfredo Kraus and Herbert von Karajan in Salzburg and Berlin.

She has also studied the piano and other musical instruments like guitar, accordion, violin and mandolin. She has composed many pieces for piano, clarinet, flute, violin and voice. After winning the Spoleto and ENAL competitions, she began her artistic career with La sonnambula by Bellini in Spoleto at the Festival dei Due Mondi under the direction of Gian Carlo Menotti.

== Operatic repertoire ==
She is considered a specialist in the repertory of Vincenzo Bellini (she has also dedicated intense study to some of his manuscripts). The other most important composers in her repertory are Donizetti, Rossini and Verdi. Several operas of these composers have become her most successful roles:

- Lucia di Lammermoor (Lucia)
- Anna Bolena (Anna)
- Lucrezia Borgia (Lucrezia)
- Beatrice di Tenda (Beatrice)
- Maria Stuarda (Maria)
- Norma (Norma)
- La sonnambula (Amina)
- I puritani (Elvira)
- Il pirata (Imogene)
- La straniera (Alaide)
- I Capuleti e i Montecchi (Giulietta)
- Semiramide (Semiramide)
- La traviata (Violetta)
- Simon Boccanegra (Maria)
- Luisa Miller (Luisa)
- Rigoletto (Gilda)

== Honours and awards ==
Aliberti has received two prestigious European Prizes: The Goldene Feder in Hamburg, the Premio Callas from the Association of Opera Friends of Milan, Iso D'Oro in Graz, Austria.

== Recordings ==
=== Complete operas ===
- Beatrice di Tenda (Beatrice), Martin Thompson (Orombello), Camille Capasso (Agnese), Paolo Gavenelli (Fillipo) – Chor und Orchester der Deutschen Oper Berlin – Fabio Luisi (conductor) – (Berlin Classics)
- Il pirata (Imogene), Stuart Neill, Roberto Frontali, Kelly Anderson – Chor und Orchester der Deutschen Oper Berlin – Marcello Viotti (conductor) – (Berlin Classics)
- La sonnambula (Amina), John Aler (Elvino), Francesco Ellero d'Artegna (Rodolfo), Iris Vermillion (Teresa), Jane Giering (Lisa), Friedrich Molsberger (Alessio), Warren Mok (Il Notario) – Chor und Orchester der Deutschen Oper Berlin – Jesús López Cobos (conductor), live recording, February 1990, Deutsche Oper Berlin (BMG Classics)
- La straniera (Alaide), Vincenzo Bello, Roberto Frontali, Sara Mingardo, Carlo Striuli – Orchestra del Teatro Verdi di Trieste – Gianfranco Masini (conductor) – (BMG Ricordi)
- La traviata (Violetta Valéry), Peter Dvorský (Alfredo Germont), Renato Bruson (Giorgio Germont) – Fujiwara Opera Chorus and Tokyo Philharmonic Orchestra – Roberto Paternostro (conductor), live recording, Tokyo (Capriccio/Delta Music)

=== Recitals ===
- Famous Opera Arias – Münchner Rundfunkorchester – Lamberto Gardelli (conductor) – (Orfeo)
- A Portrait – Nordwestdeutsche Philharmonie – Peter Feranec (conductor) – (RCA/BMG Classics)
- Viva! Belcanto – Orchestra Sinfonica Di Milano G. Verdi – Patrick Fournillier (conductor) – (RCA/BMG Classics)
- Early Verdi Arias – Orchestra Sinfonica e Coro Sinfonico di Milano Giuseppe Verdi – Oleg Caetani (conductor) – (Challenge Records)

=== DVD ===
- Lucia Aliberti – Live at Semperoper Dresden – DVD 88697 19045 9 / RCA Red Seal – SonyBMG
