= Teatro Sangiorgi, Catania =

Theatre in Sicily

Coordinates: 37.50498°N 15.08838°E

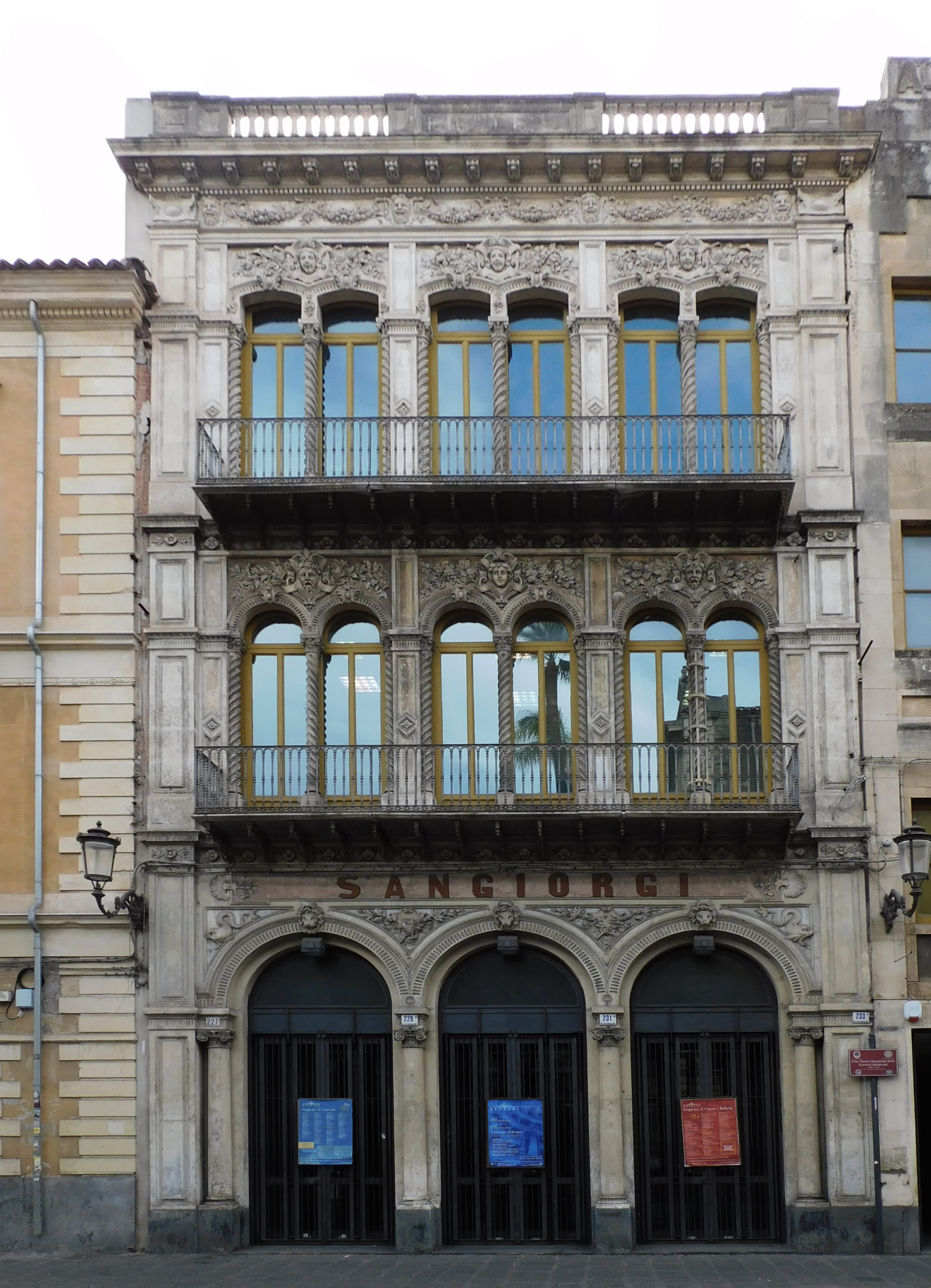
Façade of theatre

The Teatro Sangiorgi is a cinematography, song, and drama stage located on Via Antonino di Sangiuliano #233 of central Catania, region of Sicily, Italy. It was erected in 1900, across the street from the Palazzo Manganelli, and designed in a Liberty style (Italian Art Nouveau). It is presently owned by the same entity as the Teatro Massimo Bellini.

== History and description ==
When it was inaugurated on 7 July 1900 as mainly a stage for live opera during a summer season. The complex included a cafe, restaurant, and even a small hotel. The opening performance was La bohème by Giacomo Puccini. It was commissioned by Mario Sangiorgi to serve a lighter open air fare and entertainment than the opulent Teatro Massimo Bellini. By 1906, the theatre was screening cinema projections. The theatre was not roofed till 1907, and further decoration was provided in the atrium by the painter Salvatore De Gregorio.

The fortunes of the theatre declined, and by the 1960s the theatre remained closed until 2002, when it underwent restoration and commissioned the theatre as an alternate hall for the Teatro Bellini. It also stages performances for younger audiences.
