= The Albigenses (novel) =

1824 novel

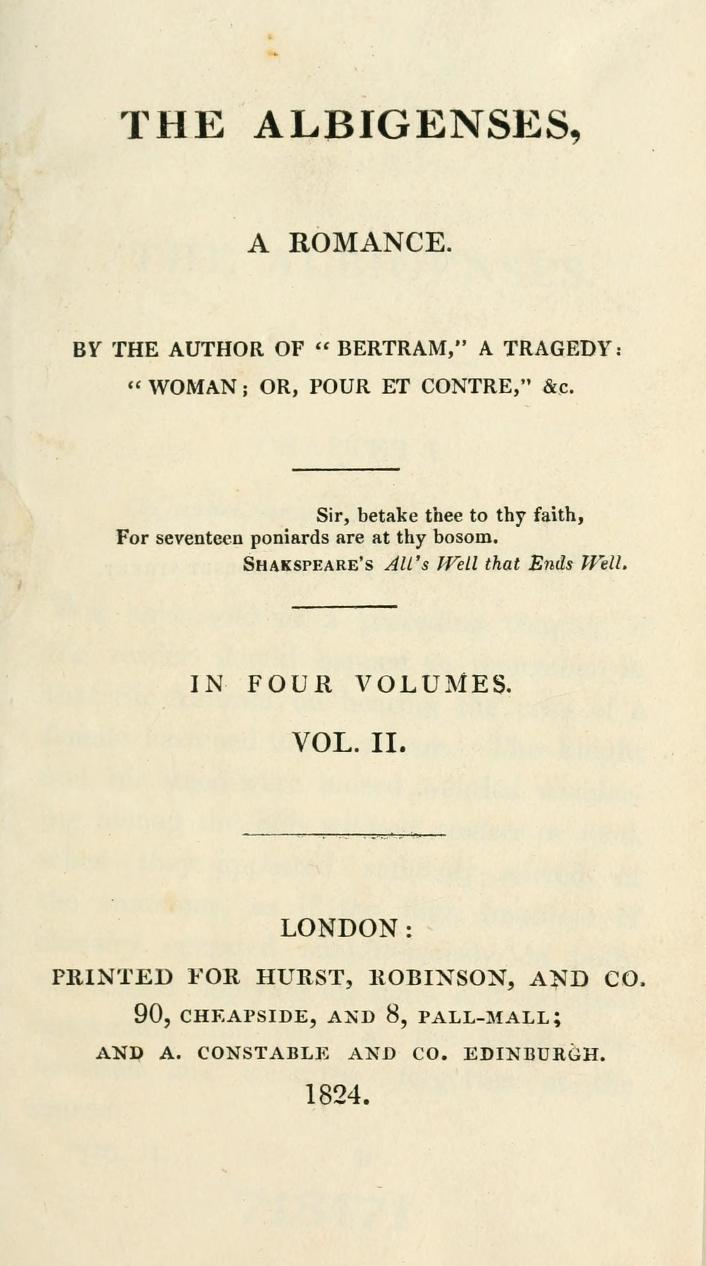
- Author: Charles Maturin
- Language: English
- Genre: Historical
- Publisher: Hurst, Robinson and Company; Constable
- Publication date: 1824
- Publication place: United Kingdom
- Media type: Print

The Albigenses is an 1824 gothic historical novel by the Irish writer Charles Maturin, published in four volumes by Hurst, Robinson, and Company in London and Constable in Edinburgh. It was published in the year of his death, and was his final novel followed by the short story Leixlip Castle (1825). The plot is set in the early thirteenth century based on the Catharists of Southern France, also known as Albigenses, after the town of Albi. Maturin, a Church of Ireland clergyman, was known for his Gothic novels and plays. Inspired by the success of Walter Scott's Waverley novels, he turned to historical fiction and the novel bears particular similarities with Scott's Ivanhoe.

== Bibliography ==
- Hayley, Barbara & Murray, Christopher (ed.) Ireland and France, a Bountiful Friendship: Literature, History, and Ideas : Essays in Honor of Patrick Rafroidi. Rowman & Littlefield, 1992.
- Kelly, Gary. English Fiction of the Romantic Period 1789–1830. Routledge, 2016.
