= Teatro Massimo Bellini =

Opera house in Catania, Italy

Coordinates: 37°30′15″N 15°05′24″E

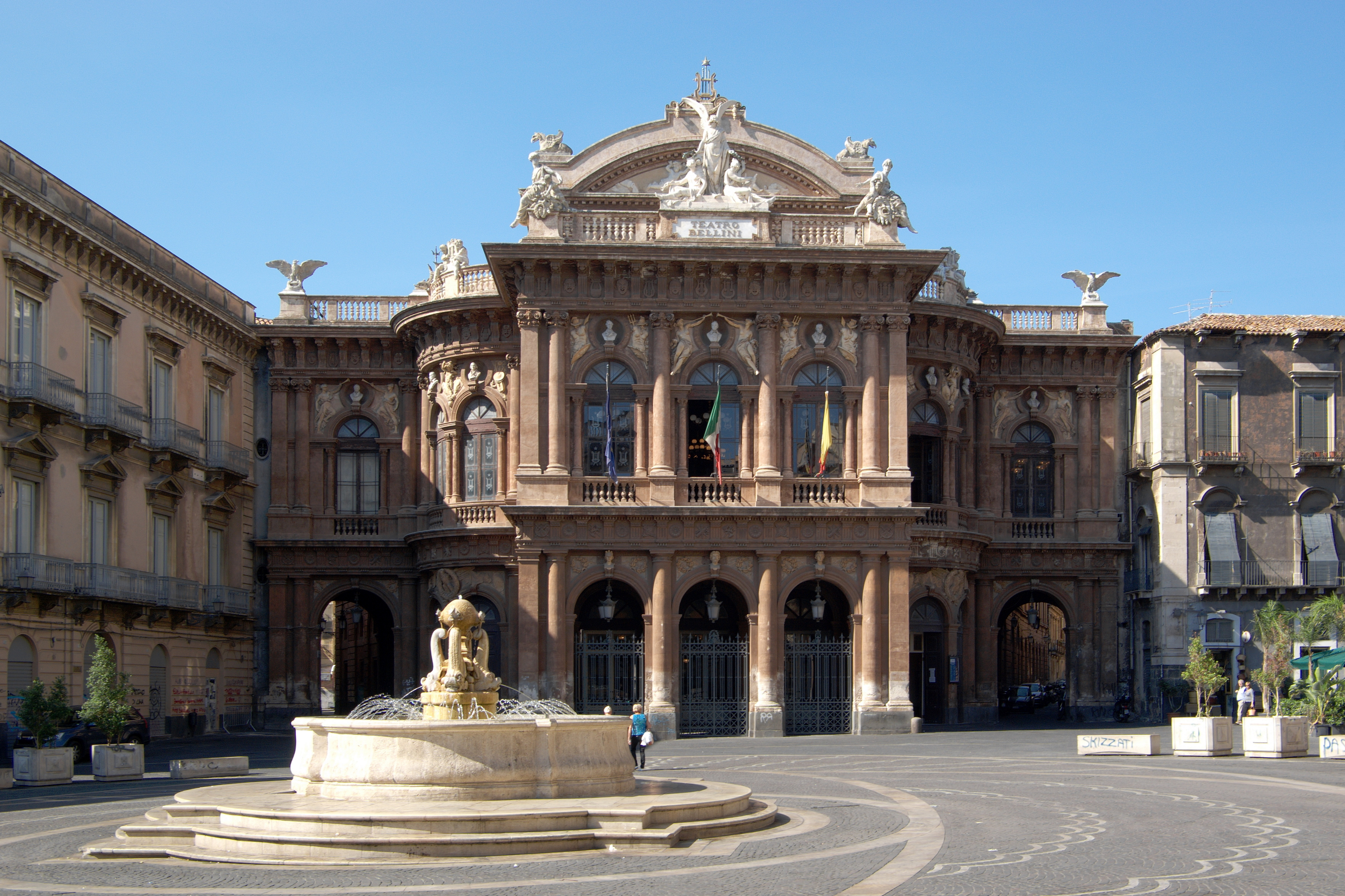
Piazza Vincenzo Bellini and the adjoining theatre

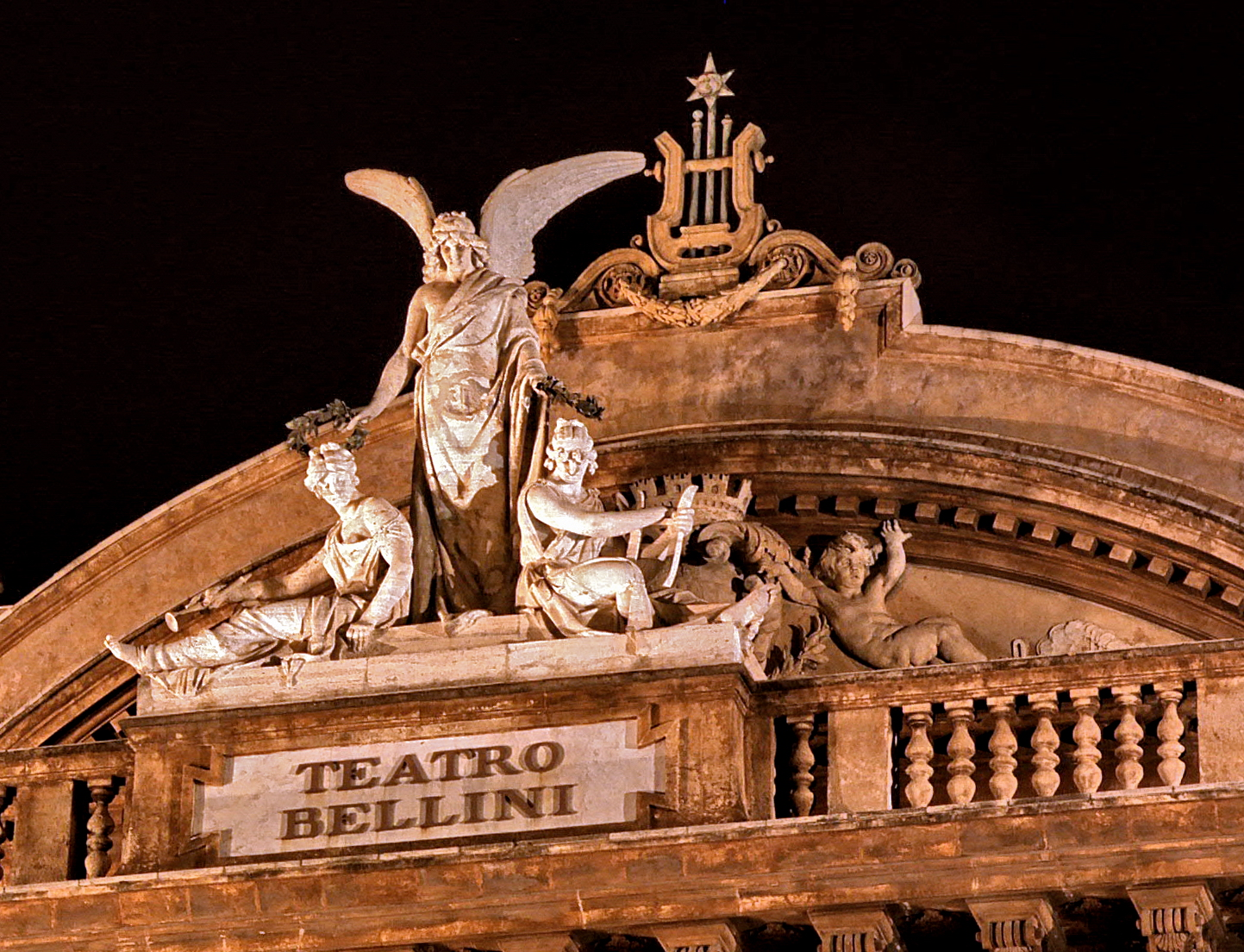
Detailed view of the front

The Teatro Massimo Bellini is an opera house located on Piazza Vincenzo Bellini in Catania, Sicily, southern Italy. Named after the local-born composer Vincenzo Bellini, it was inaugurated on 31 May 1890 with a performance of the composer's masterwork, Norma. It seats 1,200.

== History ==
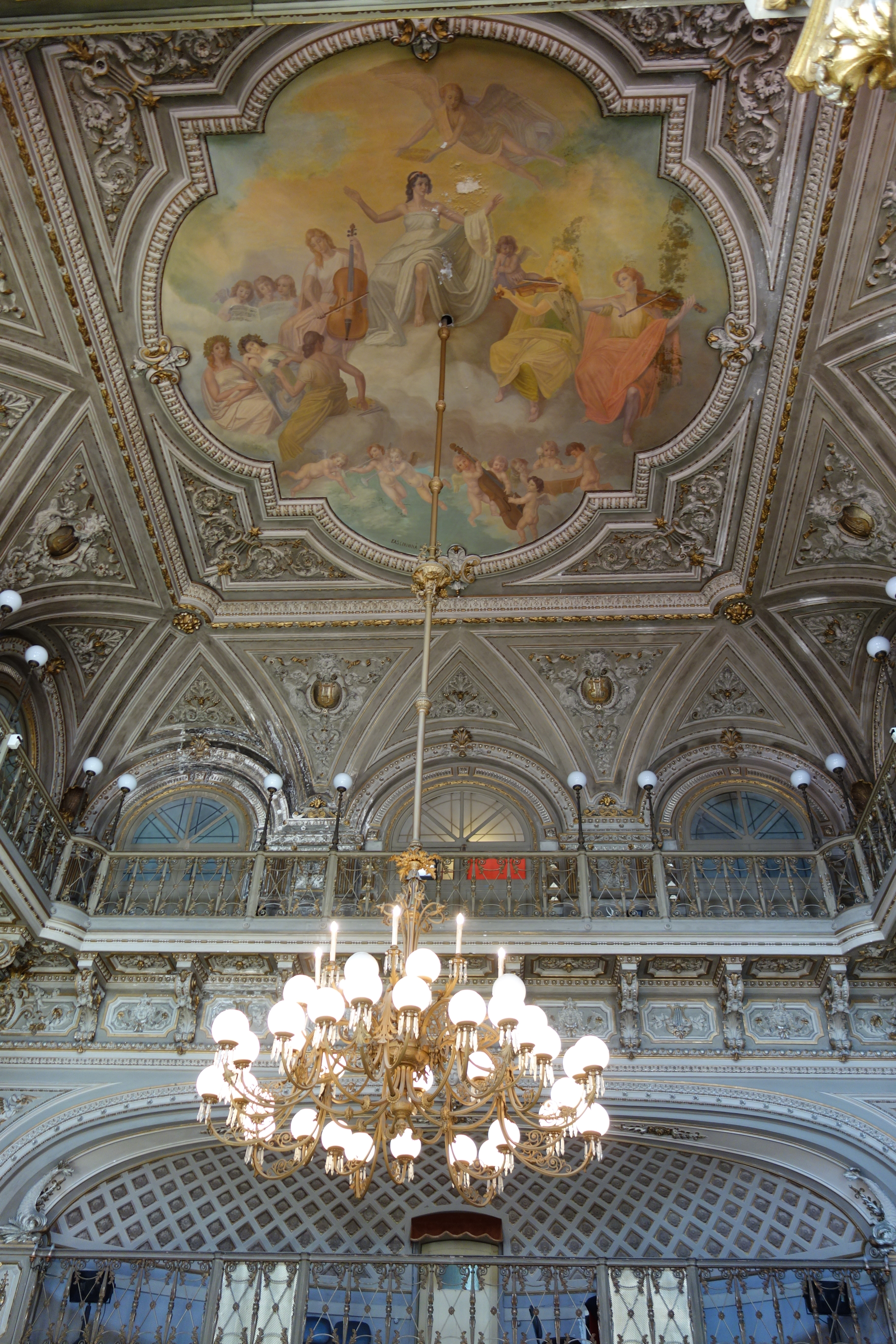
Foyer ceiling detail

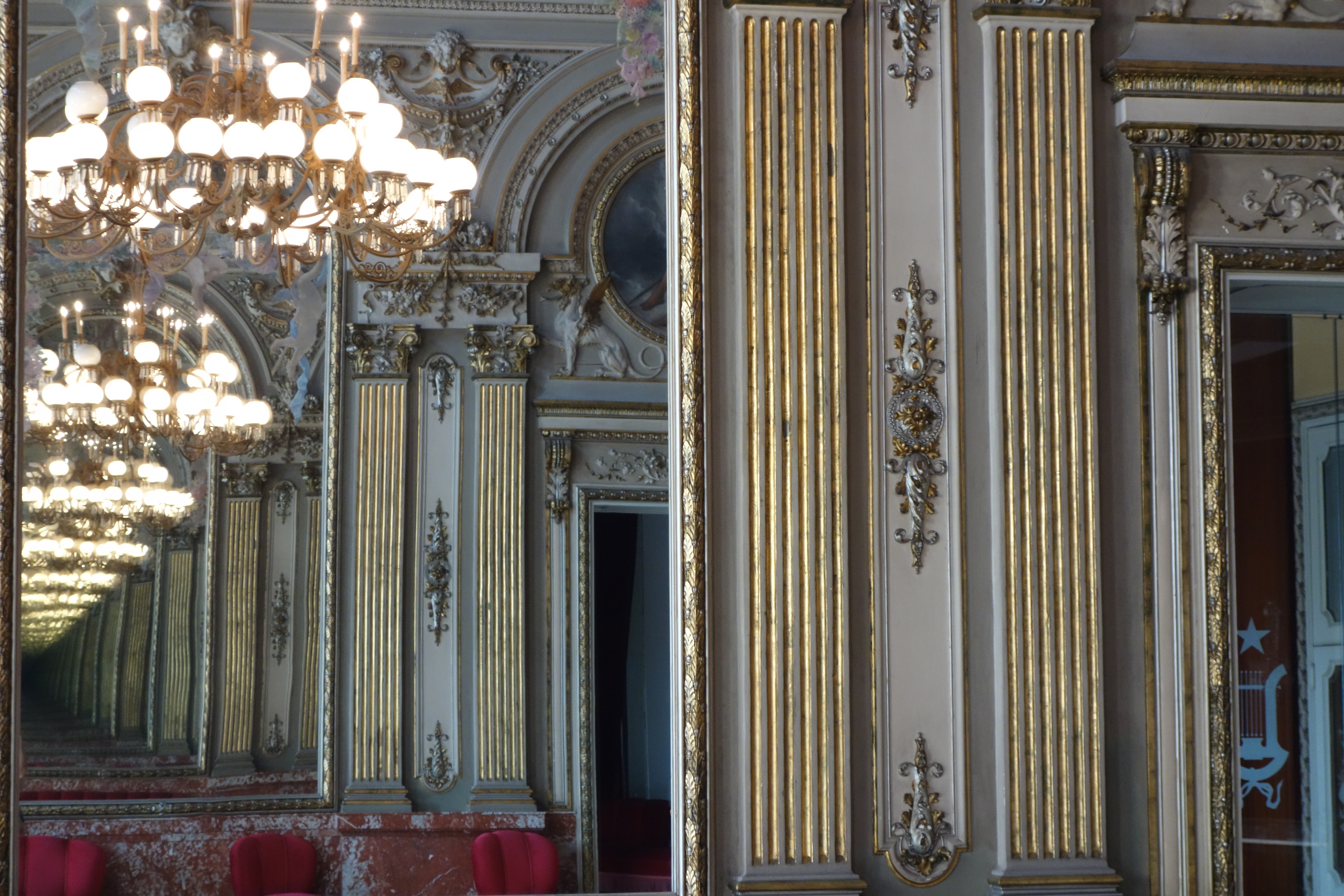
Detail of the foyer mirrors

The creation of what was to finally become the Teatro Massimo Bellini took almost two hundred years, beginning with discussions following the disastrous 1693 earthquake which completely destroyed Catania. The construction of a public theatre was discussed, and a foundation stone was finally laid in 1812.

Architect Salvatore Zahra Buda began to prepare a plan for a theatre in the Piazza Nuovaluce, in front of the Santa Maria di Nuovaluce monastery, the location of the present-day theatre. It was decided that a "Great Municipal Theatre" worthy of an expanding city should be created; the plan of the "Teatro Nuovaluce" (New Light Theatre) was a grandiose one in all respects, and was conceived to create one of the most innovative works in Italy.

Due to funding problems, work had to stop for some years. Meanwhile, a smaller theatre - the "Provisional Municipal Theatre" – was built instead, and it opened in 1822 (but was destroyed during the Second World War). Meanwhile, the Teatro Nuovaluce, after being partially completed and converted into a multi-purpose hall, was devoted mainly to summer use until 1865 when it was sold privately to finance the construction of a new theatre.

In 1870, the theatre architect Carlo Sada was appointed to find a suitable site for the new theatre. Many location options were considered for the long desired "Massimo" theatre. One location was chosen only to be turned down with the original site being brought back into the picture. This time it was to be the location for a large, multi-purpose hall. Again, funding problems arose, and the plan was taken over by the Municipality. A Municipal committee then decided that the structure should be made into a single-purpose opera house. Finally, work proceeded well, and the theatre was completed in seven years, opening in May 1890.

The style of the Catania theater is inspired by the French eclecticism of the second empire imposed on Paris by Charles Garnier with the Paris Opera. Its marble foyer, the “Ridotto”, is ornate and stuccoed, and a statue of Bellini is located between the central arches. The beautiful red-plush interior includes the main floor seating and four tiers of boxes. Surrounding them, on the upper level, are unusual arched arcades. The painted ceiling by Ernesto Bellandi depicts scenes from four of Bellini's most well-known operas.

== Opera ==
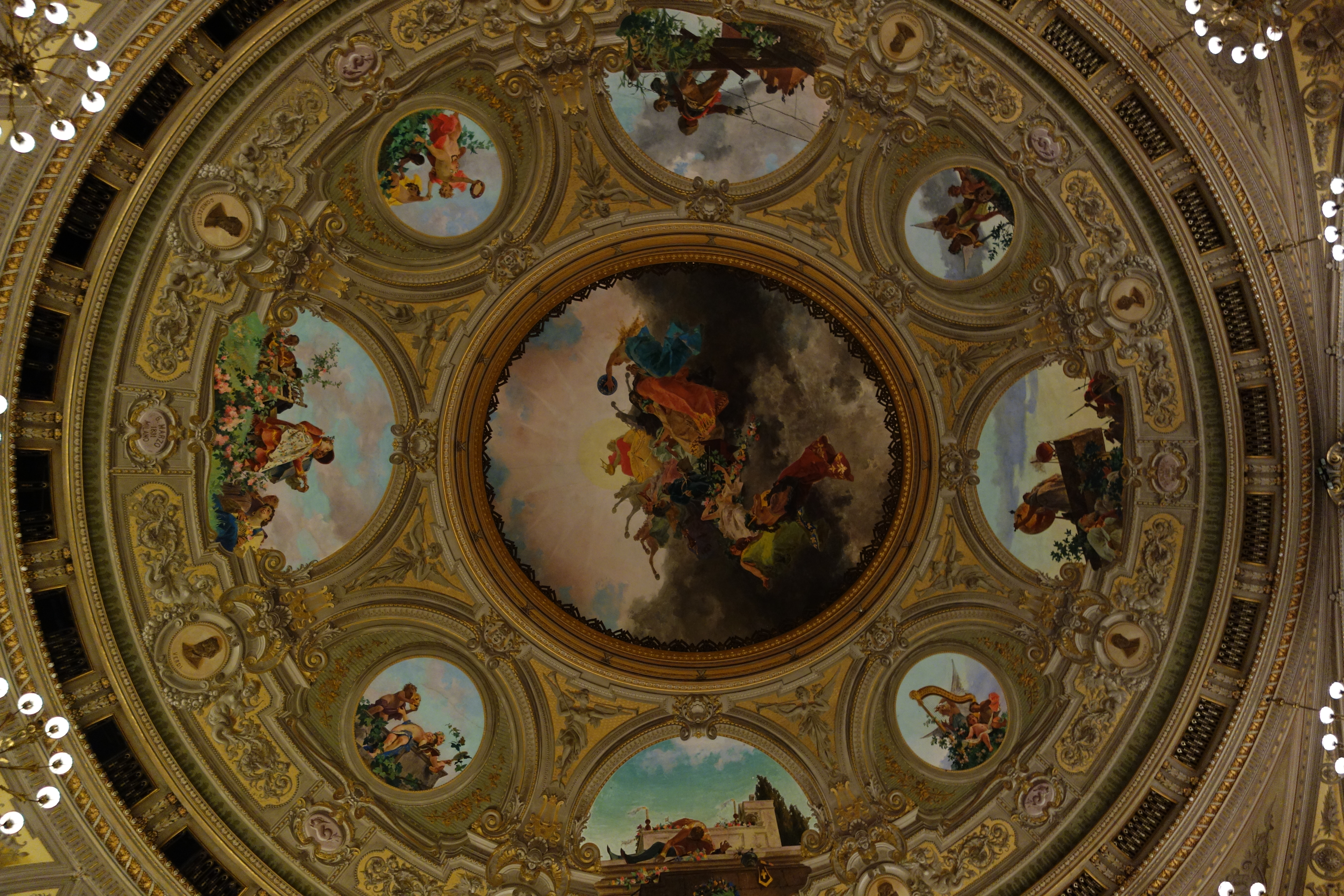
Detail of the ceiling of the large theater hall

Throughout its history, the opera house has performed almost all of Bellini's work. From its beginnings, a wide variety of operas have been performed by some highly renowned singers. In 1951, to mark the 150th anniversary of the birth of Bellini, Maria Callas sang Norma, repeating her success in 1952 and 1953.

In recent years, there has been an infusion of about $2 million, leading to the celebration of the Bellini bicentennial during the 2001 season and to a major renovation of the house.

The theater also operates the nearby smaller Teatro Sangiorgi, used for recitals, operetta, cinema, and drama.
