= The Modern Rake =

Anonymous erotic novel published in 1824

The Modern Rake is an anonymous erotic novel with nine coloured illustrations which was printed at London by J. Sudbury in 1824. The title page describes the plot: The Modern Rake; or, the Life and Adventures of Sir Edward Walford: Containing a Curious and Voluptuous History of his luscious intrigues, with numerous women of fashion, his laughable faux pas, feats of gallantry, debauchery, dissipation, and concubinism! His numerous rapes, seductions, and amatory scrapes. Memoirs of the Beautiful Courtezans with whom he lived; with some Ticklish Songs, Anecdotes, Poetry, &c. Enriched with many Curious Plates (J. Sudbury, Printer, Gate Street. 1824).

== Plot ==
Son of a lusty footman by the young wife of a debilitated old baronet, the hero displays early precocity, and having one day witnessed, himself unseen, the amorous encounter of a dustman and his "blowen", he returns home with his dress in disorder, and his erect member uncovered. The door is opened to him by a servant girl, with whom he at once proceeds to have connection. His father surprises the imprudent young couple, turns the girl out of doors, and determines to send the youth on a journey with his tutor. This gentleman proves to be a thorough libertine. On the packet they pick up a French courtesan, who accompanies them to Paris, and recounts her own adventures, which embrace some flagellation scenes, together with anecdotes of George IV, and of Rover, manager of Drury Lane Theatre. At Paris the hero lives very happily with his mistress, until one night he is robbed at a brothel, and has to regain his home in a state of complete nudity. His mistress is indignant at such conduct, and leaves him, being unwilling, as she writes, to "submit to have the leavings of any common strumpet". Tiring of Paris, young Walford passes into Spain, where he is captured by brigands. He manages however to effect his escape together with the niece of a Spanish nobleman. Hearing now of his mother's death, he hastens back to England, and is well received by his father, who, however, soon after expires. Sir Edward now reforms, and becomes a happy, married man.

== Appraisal ==
Henry Spencer Ashbee thinks the nine coloured illustrations "spirited, characteristic, and very obscene". The account of the French courtesan in the early part of the novel is "perhaps the most interesting part of the book" in his view. "Although no literary talent is displayed," he concludes, "the tale is fairly entertaining." Mention is made in the course of the story of Fanny Hill, Bawdy House Dialogues, Letters of Two Cousins, Intrigues of a Lady of Fashion, The Ladies Tell Tale, and Chevalier de Faublas.

== Printing ==
When printed by J. Sudbury in 1824, the book was advertised for the considerable sum of 3 guineas. The work was apparently reprinted a few years later by J. B. Brookes, with slight alterations in the wording of the title, the word "Adventures", for instance, being replaced by "Voluptuous Intrigues".

John Sudbury carried on business from about 1820 to 1830, chiefly at No. 252, High Holborn, and did not hesitate to attach his name to the erotic books he published. John Benjamin Brookes had a shop in the Opera Colonnade, whence he removed to 9, New Bond Street; he died in 1839.

== Sources ==
- Ashbee, Henry Spencer [Pisanus Fraxi] (1885). Catena Librorum Tacendorum. London: privately printed. pp. 125–6.
- Skipp, Jenny (2016). "'The man of penetration and the girl of capacity': negotiating power in erotic culture". In Storey, John (ed.). The Making of English Popular Culture. Directions in Cultural History. Routledge. p. 26.
