= Ernesto Bellandi =

Italian painter (1842–1916)

Ernesto Bellandi (January 1842 – 1916) was an Italian painter.

== Biography ==
He was born in Florence, Grand Duchy of Tuscany. He trained at the Academy of Fine Arts of Florence. While he had been offered a teaching post in Urbino, he began decorating a private house, for a counterfeiter of money, thus Bellandi's wages were without value. He continued to work as a decorator in Florence, often painting nymphs, sphinxes, and satyrs and other mythologic figures.

External decorations for Thermal Baths at Livorno

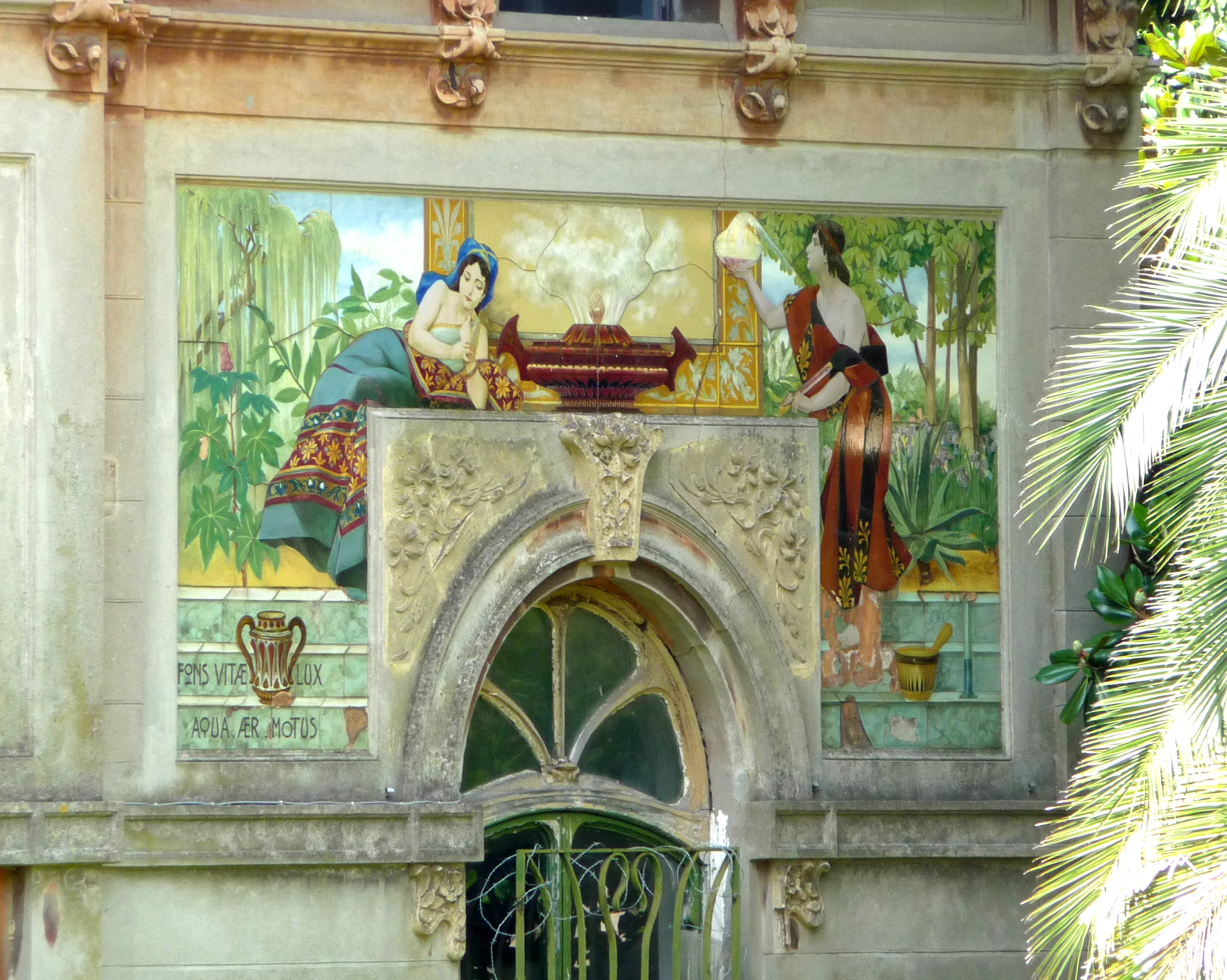

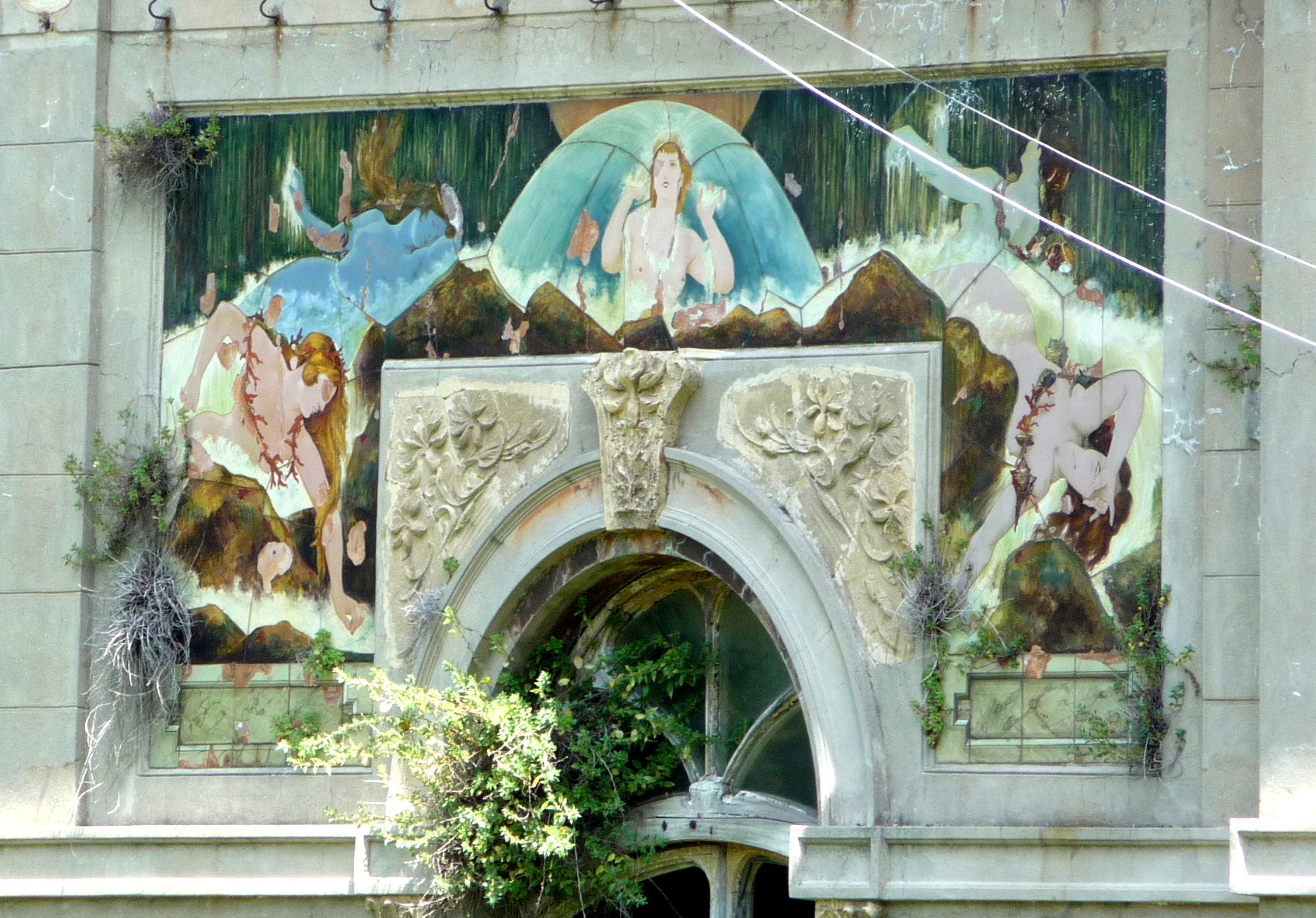

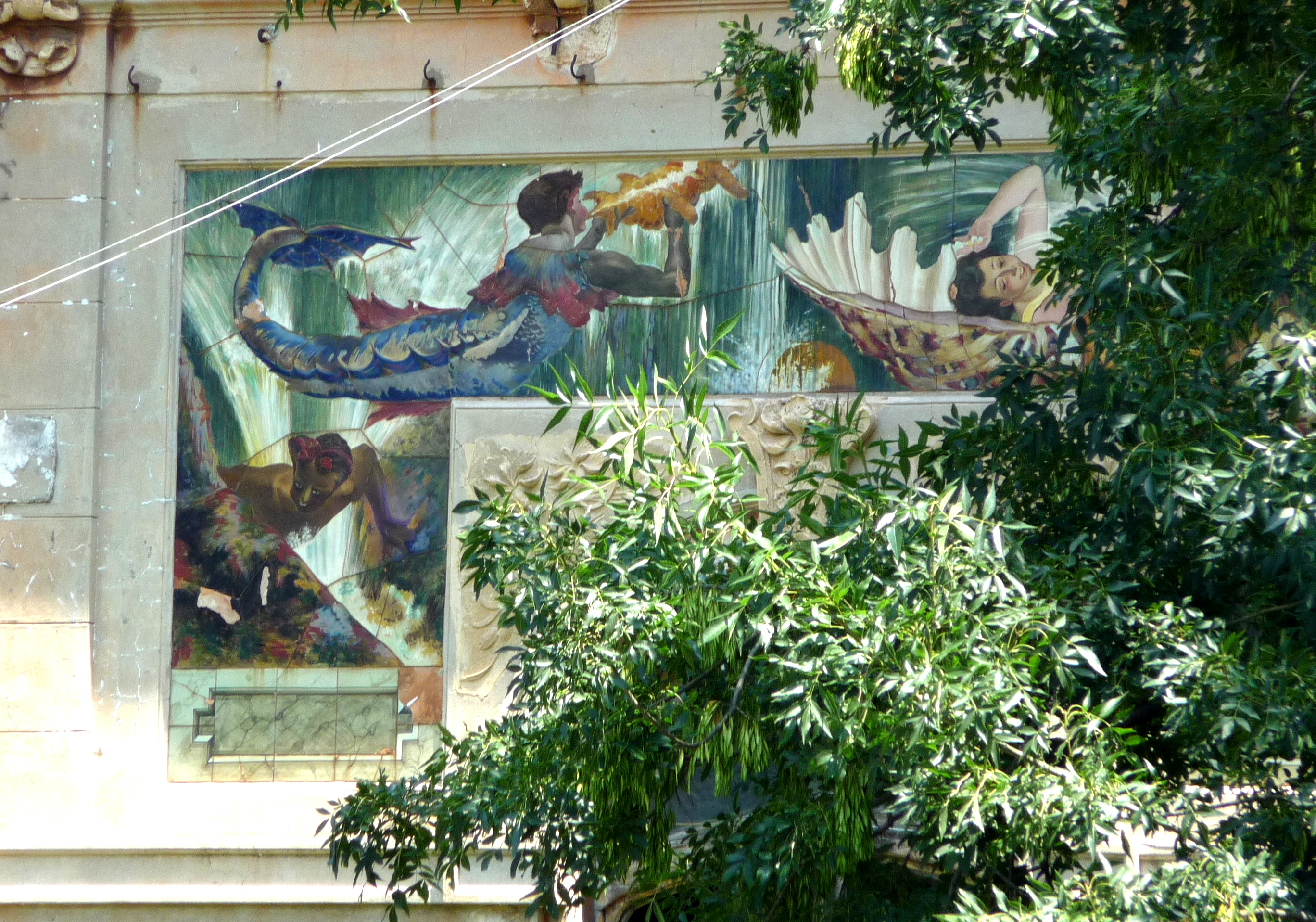

During 1871–72, Bellandi painted some lunettes at Villa Oppenheim, From there, he traveled to Bastia in Corsica to paint. In the summer of 1873, he went in Lower Austria, where he painted six large frescos, well regarded, but which were lost to inclemency and the site. In 1875, he painted in Rome a tempera depicting the Encounter of Ceaser and Cleopatra. He returned in 1877 to Bastia, on the vaults of the new theater he painted a series of flying figures. For the villa of a famous singer painted a frieze with about twenty-five figures in perspective, posing on the frame set around the room, each figure represents characters in melodramatic works of all the most famous masters. In the year 1880, Bellandi traveled to Catania to decorate the central dome of the vault of the Teatro Massimo Bellini, where he painted Vincenzo Bellini standing near the floor, with the pen in his right hand, a few sheets of music in his left, surrounded by the Muses. The surrounding frieze has putti and subjects from some of the composer's works. It appears that local newspapers questioned the quality of the work, to Bellandi's embarrassment, but a subsequent inquest cleared his name.

In 1884 he painted the vault from sotto in su of a large room of a private residence. In some frames were written the verse of Ariosto, and strong feminine characters from various novels like Lucia from Manzoni, Thecla from Schiller's Wallenstein Trilogy; Esmeralda from The Hunchback of Notre-Dame, by Victor Hugo, and the Ines of Camoens.

In the chapel of the family of brothers Orlando of Livorno, Bellandi had to paint a nonreligious subject. His clients wanted to depict their commitment to charity by giving other work. Bellandi painted two large allegorical figures, and in the distance, the construction of an iron ship and the swarm of workers illustrating the motto: In labore virtus.
