= Charles Maturin =

Irish Protestant clergyman and writer (1780–1824)

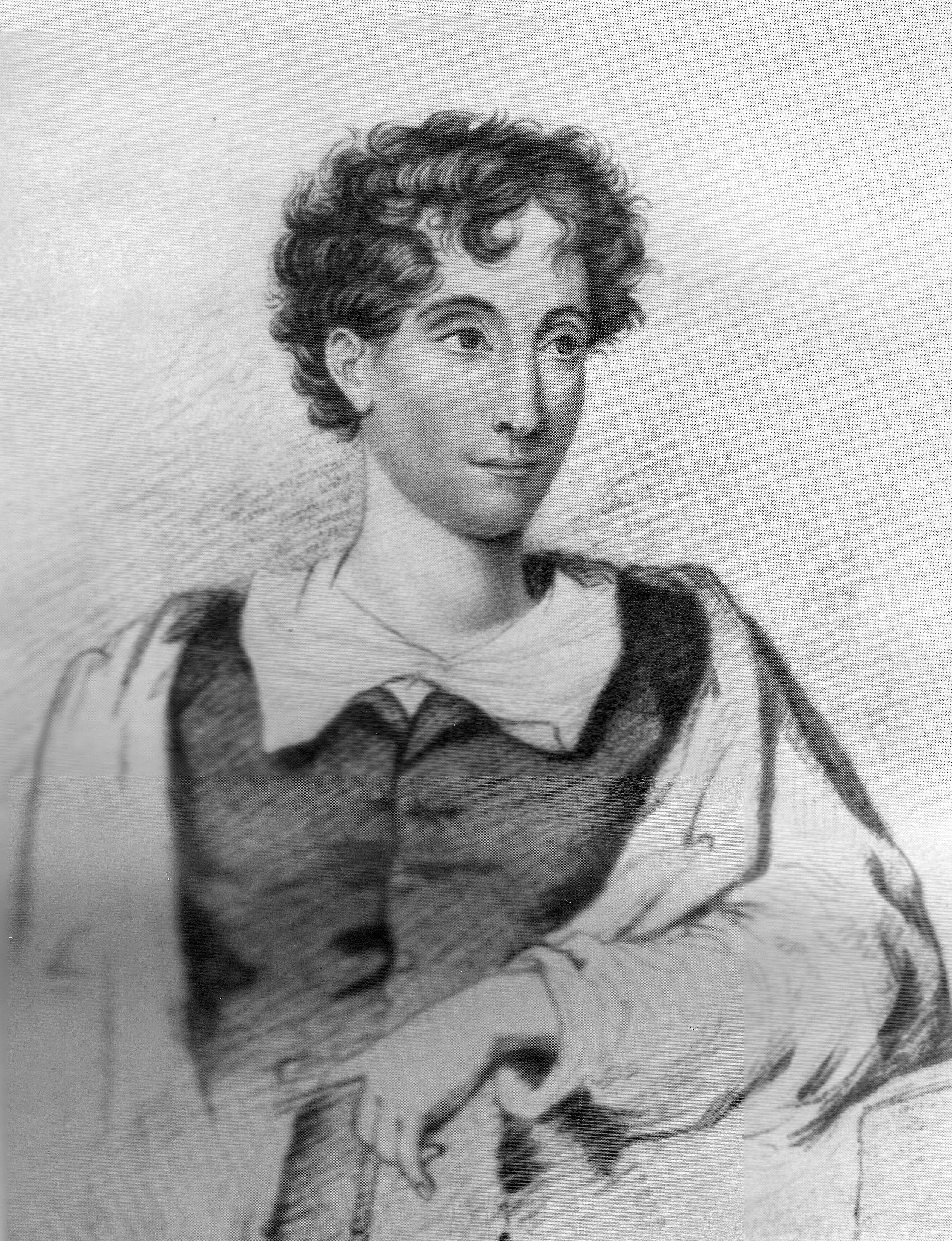
- 1819 engraving
- Born: Charles Robert Maturin; 25 September 1780; Dublin, Ireland
- Died: 30 October 1824 (aged 44); Dublin, Ireland
- Other name: C. R. Maturin
- Education: Trinity College, Dublin
- Occupations: Clergyman; writer
- Children: Edward Maturin

Charles Robert Maturin, also known as C. R. Maturin (25 September 1780 – 30 October 1824), was an Irish Protestant clergyman (ordained in the Church of Ireland) and a writer of Gothic plays and novels. His best known work is the novel Melmoth the Wanderer, published in 1820 which made a great impact on writers such as Balzac, Baudelaire and Poe.

== Early life ==
Maturin was descended from Huguenot émigrés who left France and found shelter in Ireland in the anti-Protestant persecution which followed the revocation of the Edict of Nantes in the late seventeenth century. One of these descendants was Gabriel Jacques Maturin, who became Dean of St Patrick's Cathedral, Dublin after Jonathan Swift in 1745. Charles Robert Maturin was born in Dublin and attended Trinity College. Shortly after being ordained as curate of Loughrea, County Galway, in 1803, he moved back to Dublin as curate of St Peter's Church. He lived in York Street with his father William, a Post Office official, and his mother, Fedelia Watson, and married on 7 October 1804 the acclaimed singer Henrietta Kingsbury. On 7 October 1803, Maturin and Kingsbury were involved in a marriage settlement, in which Maturin was noted as living in Banagher in the King's County (modern-day County Offaly) at the time.

In January 1805, Maturin acted as a witness to a deed in which his father William signed a lease taking on a property on the south side of York Street, Dublin for 50 years from one "James Switsir of the City of Kilkenny". The transaction had been made "in Consideration of the Sum of £500 to (Switsir) partly paid, and partly secured to be paid, by William Maturin". In March 1805, William sub-leased the same property to a "Patrick Sharkey, Doctor of Physic", and in May 1805 took out another lease on a separate property on the north side of "Fitzwilliams Street", Dublin. Further property dealings were made in subsequent years by William Maturin concerning property on Lower Mount Street, Dublin.

In a deed of assignment from August 1810, William assigned to his son Charles a property on the north side of York Street, "in Consideration of the sum of £900 to him in hand paid by said Charles [...] and in Consideration of being released from a sum of £500 then due on foot of a mortgage therein recited." This may be evidence of Charles having released his father from the earlier Switsir lease of 1805. The deed went on to further clarify that Charles Maturin "did thereby for himself, his Executors, Administrators and Assigns for Ever remise, release and Discharge the said William Maturin of, and from, the therein and hereinbefore mentioned sum of £500 due on the Mortgage [...] and from all Interest due, and to grow due, thereon". The £900 that Charles paid to his father was in fact trust money from his marriage settlement, which his trustees legally advanced to him in a Deed of Trust dated 1 August 1810.

Maturin registered a Deed of Annuity between himself and a "Catherine Rhames of the City of Dublin, Widow" in August 1812 in which it specified Rhames was to receive one annuity of fifty pounds seven shillings and three pence sterling "for and during the Natural life of the said Charles Robert Maturin, payable half yearly [...] over and above all deductions whatsoever, at the Royal Exchange in the City of Dublin or at such other place or places in the said City as She or they shall Appoint for that purpose." It is unclear who the woman was, or what her relationship with Maturin had been.

== Works ==
His first three works were Gothic novels published under the pseudonym Dennis Jasper Murphy, and were critical and commercial failures. They did, however, catch the attention of Sir Walter Scott, who recommended Maturin's work to Lord Byron. With their help, Maturin's play Bertram was staged in 1816 at the Drury Lane for 22 nights, with Edmund Kean starring in the lead role as Bertram. Financial success, however, eluded Maturin, as the play's run coincided with his father's unemployment and another relative's bankruptcy, both of them assisted by the fledgling writer. To make matters worse, Samuel Taylor Coleridge publicly denounced the play as dull and loathsome, and "melancholy proof of the depravation of the public mind", going nearly so far as to decry it as atheistic.

The Church of Ireland took note of these and earlier criticisms and, having discovered the identity of Bertram's author (Maturin had shed his nom de plume to collect the profits from the play), subsequently barred Maturin's further clerical advancement. Forced to support his wife and four children by writing (his salary as curate was £80–90 per annum, compared to the £1000 he made for Bertram), he switched back from playwright to novelist after a string of his plays met with failure. He produced several novels in addition to Melmoth the Wanderer, including some on Irish subjects and The Albigenses, a historical novel which features werewolves. Various poems have also been ascribed to Maturin on dubious grounds and appear to be the work of others. The prize-winning "Lines on the Battle of Waterloo" was published in 1816 under the name of the university graduate John Shee. "The Universe" appeared with Maturin's name on the title page in 1821, but is now thought to be almost completely the work of James Wills.

The exaggerated effectiveness of Maturin's preaching can be gauged from the two series of sermons that he published. On the occasion of the death of Princess Charlotte, he declared: "Life is full of death; the steps of the living cannot press the earth without disturbing the ashes of the dead – we walk upon our ancestors – the globe itself is one vast churchyard." A contemporary account records that there had seldom been seen such crowds at St Peter's. "Despite the severe weather, people of all persuasions flocked to the church and listened spellbound to this prince of preachers. In his obituary it was said that, 'did he leave no other monument whereon to rest his fame, these sermons alone would be sufficient'."

Maturin died in Dublin on 30 October 1824. A writer in the University Magazine was later to sum up his character as "eccentric almost to insanity and compounded of opposites – an insatiable reader of novels; an elegant preacher; an incessant dancer; a coxcomb in dress and manners."

In July 1834, a decade after his death, the Christian Examiner, and Church of Ireland Magazine praised the late Rev. Maturin, declaring that "his five sermons on the errors of the Roman Catholic Church have been considered masterpieces" and that "they attracted, in the course of their delivery, extraordinary crowds, and derive(d) an additional and melancholy interest from the fact of their being [..] the last sermons that man of eloquence and genius ever composed". The periodical lamented the fact that Maturin had spent so much of his lifetime writing novels and plays and not enough time advancing the Protestant religion, "of which he was... so bright and so able an advocate".

== International reputation ==
In 1821 Maturin's successful play was adapted into French as Bertram, ou le Pirate by Charles Nodier and Baron Isidore Justin Séverin Taylor, and ran successfully for 53 nights in the following year. This version was the source for the even more successful opera Il pirata, with a libretto by Felice Romani and music by Vincenzo Bellini, premiered at La Scala of Milan in 1827. Victor Hugo admired the play and Alexandre Dumas based his Antony upon its hero in 1831. The play was also printed and frequently produced in the United States.

The novel Melmoth the Wanderer was also published in French translation in 1821 and served as an influential model for writers in France. In 1835 Honoré de Balzac wrote a parody, Melmoth Reconcilié, in which Maturin's hero goes to Paris, where he finds in its banking world an ethos that "has replaced the principle of honour by the principle of money" and easily finds someone to accept damnation in his place. In Balzac's eyes, "this novel is taken up with the same idea to which we already owe the drama of Faust and out of which Lord Byron has cut his cloth since Manfred". Charles Baudelaire was also an admirer of Maturin's novel, equating it with the poetry of Byron and Edgar Allan Poe.

== Family connections ==
A sister of Maturin's wife married Charles Elgee, whose daughter Jane Francesca became the mother of Oscar Wilde. Thus Charles Maturin was Oscar Wilde's great-uncle by marriage. Wilde discarded his own name and adopted the name of Maturin's novel, Melmoth, during his exile in France.

Maturin's eldest son, William Basil Kingsbury Maturin, followed him into the ministry, as did several of his grandsons. One of these, Basil W. Maturin, died in the sinking of RMS Lusitania in 1915. The second son was Edward Maturin, who emigrated to the United States and became a novelist and poet there.

William Maturin (1803–1887), a Tractarian, was the Church of Ireland priest at Grangegorman and also librarian of Archbishop Marsh's Library, Dublin, from 1872 until 1887.

== Opera ==
- Six Lextures on the Events of Holy Week (Oxonii, 1860)
- The Blessedness of the Dead in Christ (Londinii, 1888)

== Known works ==
=== Novels ===
- The Fatal Revenge; or, the Family of Montorio (1807)
- The Wild Irish Boy (1808)
- The Milesian Chief (1812)
- Women; or, Pour et Contre; a Tale (1818)
- Melmoth the Wanderer (1820)
- The Albigenses (1824)

=== Short Story ===
- Leixlip Castle (1825)

=== Plays ===
- Bertram; or The Castle of St. Aldobrand (1816)
- Manuel (1817)
- Fredolfo (1819)
- Osmyn the Renegade (fragments published posthumously in 1830, but in rehearsal at Covent Garden in 1822. Staged in Dublin in 1830 and Edinburgh in 1831)

=== Sermons ===
- Sermons (1819)
- Five Sermons on the Errors of the Roman Catholic Church (1824)
