= Joachim Pettoletti =

European composer

Gioacchino (Joachim) Pettoletti (born 1792) was a European composer who lived in Copenhagen, St. Petersburg, and possibly elsewhere.
