= Charles Holland (actor, born 1768) =

English actor

- Born: 1768
- Died: 1849?
- Occupation: Actor

Charles Holland (1768–1849?) was an English actor.

== Biography ==
Holland was the son of Thomas Holland of Chiswick, and the nephew of Charles Holland. After playing for some time in the country he appeared at Drury Lane, 31 October 1796, as Marcellus in ‘Hamlet.’ At this theatre he remained until the season of 1819–1820, getting few chances and failing to improve his position. His debut attracted some attention, and his portrayal of Trueman in The London Merchant—opposite Mrs. Siddons as Milwood—was described in the Monthly Mirror (vol. ii, p. 499) as ‘a chaste, manly, and feeling performance’. On 15 February 1798, on the death of Palmer, who was replaced by Barrymore, he portrayed the character of Count Wintersen in the ‘Stranger’. During the illness of Charles Kemble he performed Alonzo in ‘Pizarro,’ in which piece he was the original Centinel, 24 May 1799. He also essayed Palmer's character of Sydenham in the ‘Wheel of Fortune,’ and was said to have proved ‘that his talents were entitled to more attention and encouragement from the managers.’ He acted many subordinate parts in unimportant dramas by Whalley, Cherry, S. Sotheby, Cumberland, and others at Drury Lane. On 15 June 1800, he played Cassio, and on 20 November 1800 the Dauphin in ‘King John.’ On 25 April 1801 he was the original Infirmier in ‘Julian and Agnes,’ by Sotheby. On 6 June 1809, as Steinfort in ‘The Stranger,’ he made his first appearance at the Haymarket, where, 25 July 1810, he was the original Henry Mortimer in Eyres's ‘High Life in the City.’ He accompanied the Drury Lane company in its migration to the Lyceum, and on the opening of the new theatre, 10 October 1812, was Horatio to Elliston's Hamlet. Holland supported Kean in many plays, was York to Kean's Richard II, the original Hassan to his Selim in the ‘Bride of Abydos,’ the original Mendizabel to Kean's Manuel in Maturin's play of ‘Manuel,’ 8 March 1817, and Buckingham to Kean's Richard III, 8 November 1819. He was the Earl of Angus in ‘Flodden Field,’ an adaptation of ‘Marmion,’ and Cedric in the ‘Hebrew,’ Soane's adaptation of ‘Ivanhoe.’ On 24 April 1820 he played Gloucester to Kean's Lear, repeating the character on several succeeding nights. Gilliland speaks of him as having a delicacy of nerve that interfered with his success, says his intellect was under the direction of a refined education, and adds that his figure was not ungraceful and his deportment not inelegant. A contributor to ‘Notes and Queries’ recalls him as a fine-looking man, and says ‘he died in 1849.’ His sister Elizabeth married Joseph Constantine Carpue.
