= Giovanna Gray =

Opera by Nicola Vaccai

- Opera by Nicola Vaccai
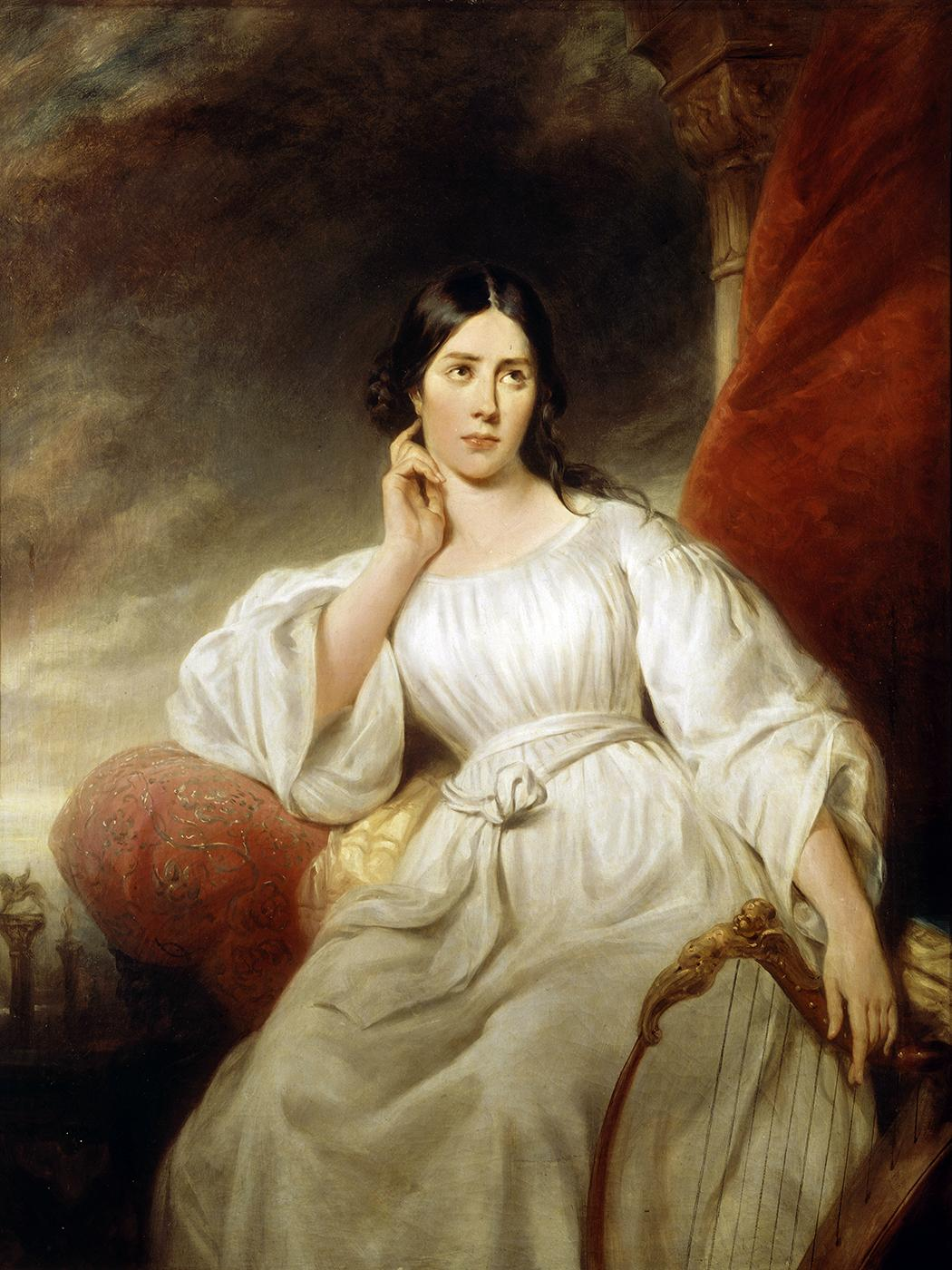
- Maria Malibran, who sang the title role at the opera's premiere
- Librettist: Carlo Pepoli
- Premiere: 23 February 1836; La Scala, Milan

Giovanna Gray is a tragic opera (tragedia lirica) in three acts composed by Nicola Vaccai. The libretto by Carlo Pepoli is based on the last days of the English noblewoman Lady Jane Grey who was executed for treason in 1554. The opera premiered on 23 February 1836 at La Scala, Milan, with Maria Malibran in the title role. It was a failure at its premiere, and the work never entered the repertoire. Malibran's performances in Giovanna Gray were the last time she appeared on the stage of La Scala.

== Background ==
Giovanna Gray marked Vaccai's return to opera composing after a hiatus of almost 8 years. He composed it specifically for Maria Malibran who had often sung Romeo in his earlier opera (and his only major success), Giulietta e Romeo. As a vehicle for one of the reigning prima donnas of the day, the tragic story of Lady Jane Grey was an apt one and had been the inspiration for numerous plays, poems, and paintings. Donizetti had thought of using it when his opera Maria Stuarda ran into trouble with the censors in Naples and Milan. Vaccai's librettist, Carlo Pepoli, based the libretto on Nicholas Rowe's 1715 play The Tragedy of Lady Jane Grey. According to Jean Marsden, a scholar of Restoration and 18th century literature, Rowe's play typified the dramatic subgenre of "she-tragedy", plays which focus on "the suffering and death of a female protagonist, whose protracted 'distress' represents the tragedy's main action." Vaccai's operatic version was no exception. As the critic from Teatri, arti e letteratura noted, the climax of the second act and the entire third act rested entirely on the shoulders of Malibran.

== Premiere and reception ==
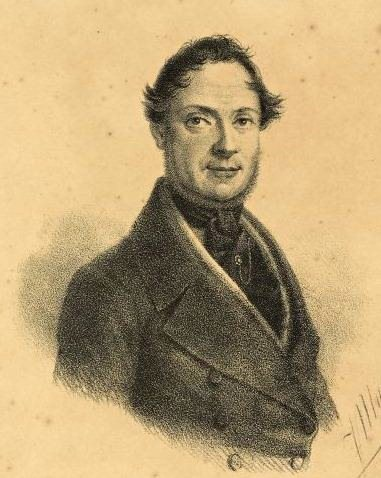
Composer Nicola Vaccai

Giovanna Gray premiered at La Scala on 23 February 1836 in a production with sets designed by Baldassarre Cavallotti and Domenico Menozzi and lavish costumes by Giovanni Mondini. The audience applauded Malibran's performance, if not the opera itself, although applause did break out briefly for Vaccai after the orchestral introduction and at the end of the opening chorus. Malibran herself had not been happy with the opera according to her lover, Charles de Bériot, in a letter written to Auguste de Louvois on the day before the premiere. The press reviews of the opening night were scathing.

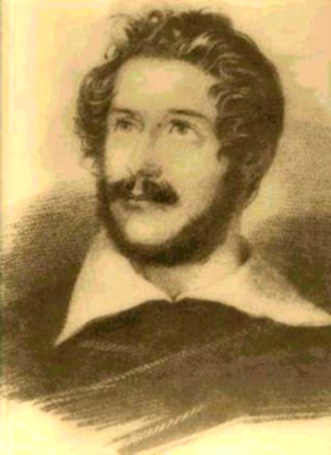
Librettist Carlo Pepoli

The critics complained that the opera was over-long and boring and that the four main characters (three of whom are dead by the end) failed to generate much sympathy from the audience. The critic from Glissons n'appuyons pas noted that Malibran gave her all to a role which was very long and tiring, but in vain. The audience was applauding her effort rather than her success. The tenor Domenico Reina (who played Giovanna's husband) was pronounced weak and out of tune and Ignazio Marini (who played her father) in poor voice and obviously not singing willingly. While there was some praise for the opera's orchestral introduction, described by the critic from Teatri, arti e letteratura as the most "luminous" piece in the score, the rest of the music was criticized for its lack of imagination and originality. However, it was Carlo Pepoli's libretto that came in for the worst criticism. La Moda wrote that "it seems impossible that Maestro Vaccai, who lacks neither intelligence nor experience, would consent to set a mess like this to music." Teatri, arti e letteratura described the libretto as "in every aspect, one of the most monstrous productions that has ever come from the pen of a poetaster."

Shortly after the premiere, Casa Ricordi published several excerpts from the opera as sheet music, including the duet sung by Giovanna's husband and father in Act 2, Volgi il guardo intorno (Look around you), and Giovanna's final cavatina of the opera, "Cara deh! asciuga il pianto" (Dear one! Dry your tears). In April 1836, Teatri, arti e letteratura reported rumours that Giovanna Gray would be performed in London by Malibran at the Theatre Royal, Covent Garden and by Giulia Grisi at the Italian Opera House. In the end, neither performance took place. Malibran's appearances in Giovanna Gray marked her last ones at La Scala. She returned to London and created only one more role (Isoline in The Maid of Artois) before her death in September 1836 at the age of 28. Vaccai went on to compose three more operas, but like Giovanna, they soon fell into obscurity.

== Roles ==
Role	Voice type	Premiere cast, 23 February 1836 (Conductor: Eugenio Cavallini)
Giovanna Gray (Lady Jane Grey)	mezzo-soprano	Maria Malibran
Lord Guilford (Lord Guildford Dudley), Giovanna's husband	tenor	Domenico Reina
Enrico Gray (Henry Grey), Giovanna's father	bass	Ignazio Marini
Giovanni Dudley (John Dudley), Lord Guilford's father	bass	Carlo Marcolini
Anna, Giovanna's friend	mezzo-soprano	Felicita de Bayllou-Hilaret
Il Lord Cancelliere, the Lord Chancellor	bass	Bartolomeo Mignani
Arturo, commandant of the Tower of London	tenor	Napoleone Marconi
Peers of the realm, courtiers, soldiers, guards, Giovanna's ladies-in-waiting

== Synopsis ==
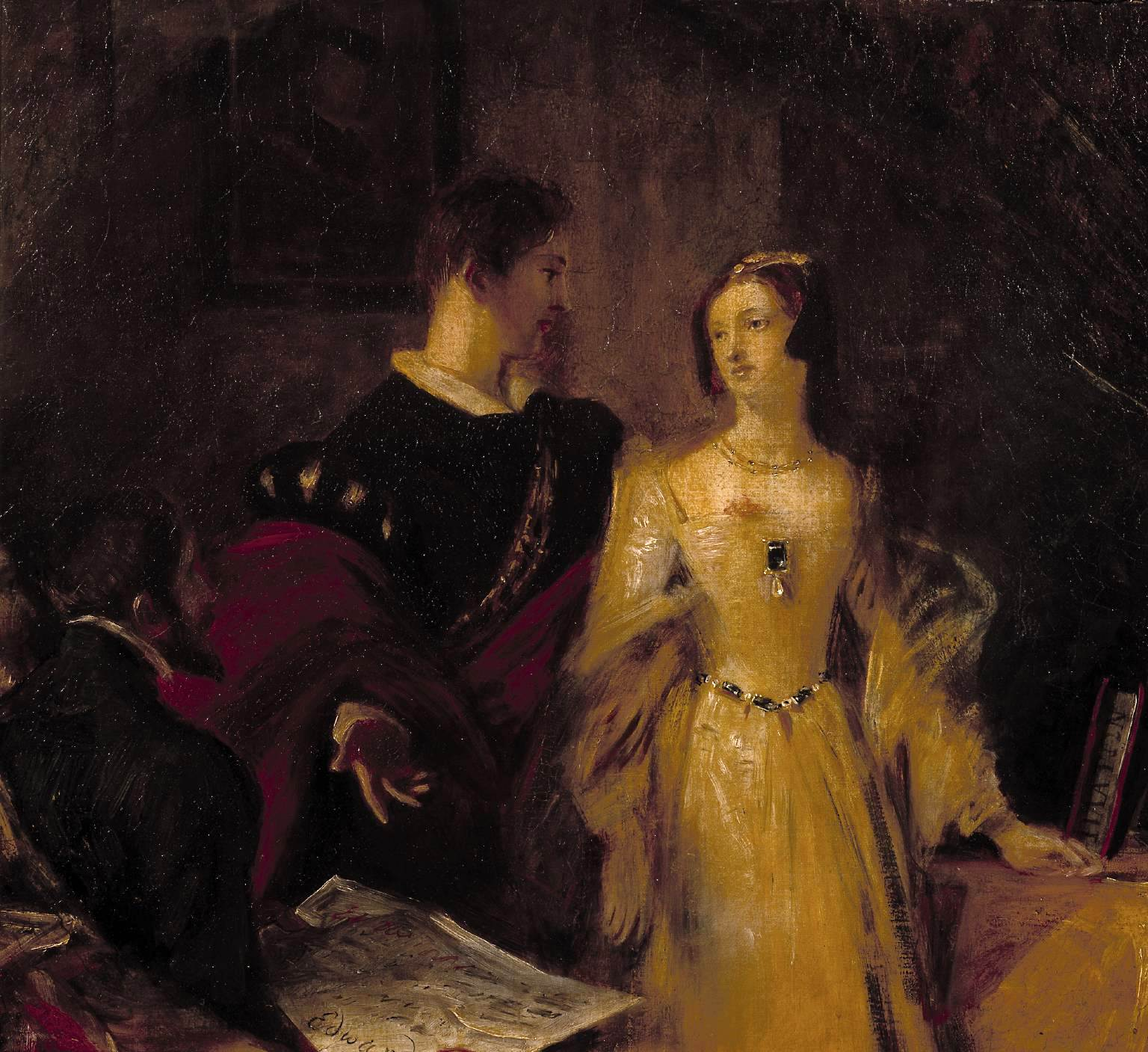
Lady Jane Grey Prevailed on to Accept the Crown by Charles Robert Leslie, 1827. She is depicted here with her husband, Guildford Dudley

London, 1553-1554

Act 1

Late at night in a courtyard of the King's palace, a chorus of noblemen and peers of the realm sing of the impending death of the young King Edward VI. Enrico Gray (Giovanna's father) recounts his visit to Edward's death bed. Later, trumpets sound and the doors to the royal apartments open. Lords, heralds, and guards descend the stairs from the apartment, followed by courtiers bearing torches and finally Guilford Dudley (Giovanna's husband) and Giovanni Dudley (his father). The king's death is announced. All lament and proclaim their loyalty to Giovanna, whom Edward has named as his heir.

In Giovanna's apartments her ladies-in-waiting, some of them playing harps, sing praises to her beauty, learning, and virtue. Giovanna and her friend Anna enter. She reflects on the death of the king and her own future with a sense of foreboding. Later, Guilford and his father discuss the threat posed by Edward's half-sister Mary who wants the throne at all costs. In her mother's apartments Giovanna, Guilford, and his father discuss the future. She is reluctant to assume the throne, but is eventually convinced by her husband. Enrico expresses his joy at the turn of events. Giovanni Dudley returns, accompanied by Lords, heralds, and officials bearing the royal regalia. Giovanna is proclaimed Queen as all present sing her praises. She vows to serve virtuously and be worthy of their trust.

Act 2

Giovanna and her court have taken up residence in the royal apartments of the Tower of London. Meanwhile, her rival, Mary, has assembled troops outside the city in an effort to gain the throne. In a vast gallery, the courtiers and privy councilors discuss the news of Giovanni Dudley's defeat in the battle with Mary's supporters and worry about their own fate. They decide to switch sides and proclaim their loyalty to Mary. Enrico laments their betrayal. Guilford enters and joins Enrico in his lament at the betrayal and Mary's impending victory: "Volgi il guardo intorno" (Look around you). He then vows to defend Giovanna with his life. Later, Giovanna seeks out Enrico, followed by her ladies-in-waiting. He appears troubled and she tries to find out why. Enrico attempts to hide the truth. Then Guilford arrives, distraught, to announce that his father has been beheaded and all appears lost. Giovanna, too, becomes distraught.

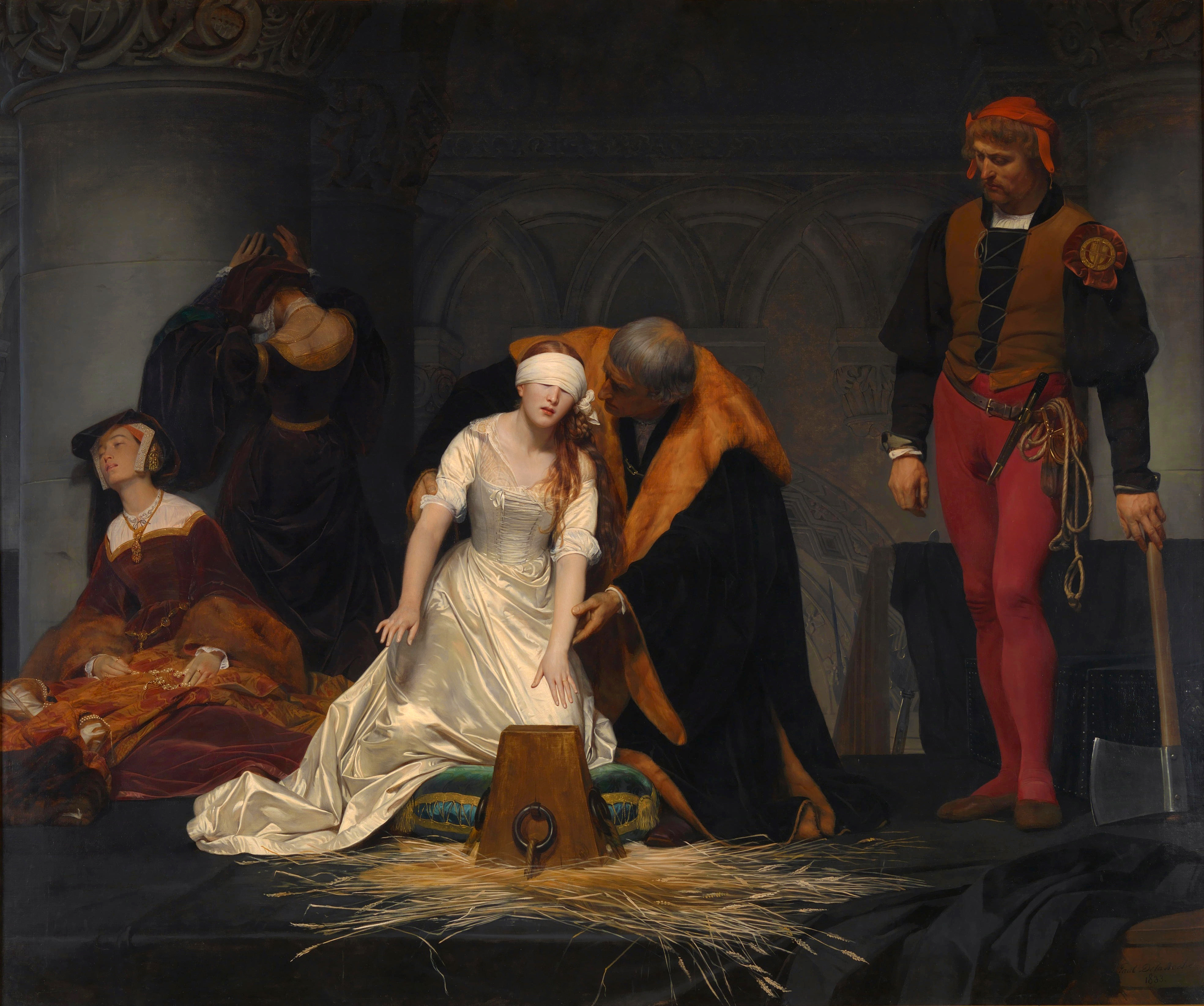
The Execution of Lady Jane Grey, by Paul Delaroche, 1833

Outside, a chorus of soldiers who support Mary rejoice at her victory. Giovanna, Guilford, and Enrico reflect on the events and Giovanna insists that she will remain queen. Anna and Giovanna's ladies-in-waiting become terrified at the shouts of the soldiers outside. The Lord Chancellor enters to the sound of drumbeats. He is accompanied by soldiers, led by Arturo, the commandant of the Tower. The Lord Chancellor informs Giovanna that she has been deposed. In a lengthy finale, Giovanna accepts her fate, asks that only she be punished and that her husband and father be spared. She bids them all farewell.

Act 3

Giovanna is imprisoned in the dungeon of the Tower of London. She and her husband Guilford have been tried and sentenced to death for treason. Some of her relatives and the Lord Chancellor are present. Anna is asleep beside her. Giovanna's family deplore her fate. After they leave, the Lord Chancellor asks why Giovanna is dressed all in white. Anna tells him that her friend wishes to be dressed as a bride when she joins her husband in heaven. Giovanna becomes distraught and delusional, mistaking Anna for her mother. Anna bursts into tears. Giovanna recovers her composure and comforts her: "Cara deh! asciuga il pianto" (Dear one! dry your tears). Drums and a funeral march are heard outside the cell door. Guilford is being led to his execution. He and Giovanna bid each other farewell through the closed door as he passes her cell.

In the final scene, the cell door opens to reveal a staircase leading to the castle courtyard. It is lined with soldiers bearing torches. Judges and family members are gathered at the foot of the stairs. Arturo tells Giovanna that the hour of her execution has come. After singing a final prayer and farewell, Giovanna ascends the stairs. All present pray for her. She believes them to be a chorus of angels and sings to her dead husband. Her final words are "I'm coming to you dear bridegroom!" (The curtain falls.)

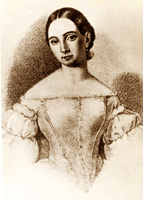
Luigia Abbadia who sang the title role in Pasini's Giovanna Grey

== Musical numbers ==
- Symphony

=== Act I ===
- N. 1 - Introduction Dalla reggia ov'è lutto e terror (Chorus, Enrico, Dudley, Guilford)
- N. 2 - Chorus and Cavatine Chi non vide Giovanna la bella - Delle cetre e dell'arpe il bel suono (Giovanna, Chorus)
- N. 3 - Quartet Voce del Ciel divina (Giovanna, Dudley, Enrico, Guilford)
- N. 4 - Finale Act I Se tu nieghi, ah! Tu ben sai - Figlia, è pur ver? (Guilford, Giovanna, Enrico, Dudley, Chorus)

=== Act II ===
- N. 5 - Introduction Ansanti e perplessi gli araldi son spessi! (Chorus, Arturo)
- N. 6 - Duet Volgi, volgi il guardo intorno (Guilford, Enrico)
- N. 7 - Trio Dimmi, s'è ver che m'ami (Giovanna, Enrico, Guilford)
- N. 8 - Chorus Oh patria! Oh popolo! plaudi, ti desta
- N. 9 - Finale Act II Turbato nell'anima (Chancellor, Giovanna, Chorus, Guilford, Enrico, Chorus)

=== Act III ===
- N. 10 - Introduction Dormi, infelice, posati (Chorus, Chancellor)
- N. 11 - Chorus and Final Air Ai cantici del duolo - A me, diletto sposo... (Giovanna, [Chancellor, Anna, Arturo], Chorus)

== Other operas about Jane Grey ==
In reporting the poor reviews received by Giovanna Gray, the Revue et gazette musicale de Paris expressed astonishment that such an interesting and tragic subject had not been set by a composer capable of making it a dramatic success and suggested Meyerbeer, Rossini, or Halévy as possibilities. Several minor composers did subsequently attempt operas about Jane Grey but with little success. Antonio d'Antoni composed a version in 1848 for the opera house in Trieste, but it was never performed. Timoteo Pasini's version, Giovanna Grey, set to a libretto by Giovanni Pennacchi, had a "triumphant" premiere at the Teatro Comunale in Ferrara in 1853 with Luigia Abbadia in the title role. It was performed again in Jesi at the Teatro Pergolesi the following year, but did not remain in the repertoire. Giuseppe Menghetti's Giovanna Gray, which re-used Pepoli's libretto and premiered in Trieste during the carnival season of 1859, was soon forgotten. A similar fate befell Henri Büsser's Jane Grey which premiered in 1891. Arnold Rosner tackled the subject with The Chronicle of Nine, composed in 1984 to a libretto based on the stage play of the same name by Florence Stevenson. Rosner's work received a full recording in February 3 and 4, 2020, at Mechanics Hall in Worcester, Massachusetts, by Odyssey Opera with the soprano Megan Pachecano as Lady Jane Gray and the contralto Stephanie Kacoyanis as Lady Mary, then Queen Mary of England , more than six years after the composer's death in November 8, 2013.
