= Lady Jane Grey (play) =

1715 play

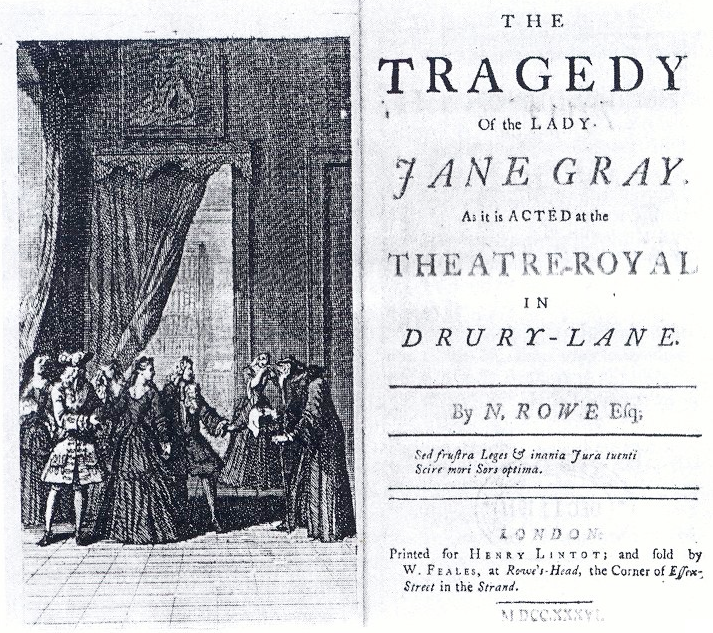
- Original language: English
- Written by: Nicholas Rowe
- Genre: Tragedy

Premiere
- Date: 20 April 1715
- Place: Drury Lane Theatre

The Tragedy of Lady Jane Grey, often shortened to Lady Jane Grey, is a 1715 tragedy by the British writer Nicholas Rowe. It portrays the brief reign of Lady Jane Grey, a pretender to the English throne following the death of Edward VI and her defeat and execution by Mary I in 1554. The title role was played by the prominent actress Anne Oldfield. The cast also included John Mills as the Duke of Northumberland, Barton Booth as Lord Guilford Dudley and Lacy Ryan as the Earl of Sussex, Colley Cibber as Bishop Gardiner, James Quin as the Lieutenant of the Tower and Mary Porter as the Duchess of Suffolk.

Rowe was a staunch Whig and wrote the play in the wake of the Hanoverian Succession where George I had taken the throne ahead of his Catholic Jacobite rival James Stuart, who launched an unsuccessful rebellion later in 1715. Rowe dedicated the work to Caroline, Princess of Wales drawing comparisons between her and Lady Jane Grey as a rightful Protestant heir. Shortly afterwards he was appointed Poet Laureate.

It was the final play written by Rowe. Although not his most successful play, it was revived on a number of occasions during the following century. The 1836 opera Giovanna Gray, with a libretto by Carlo Pepoli, was based on the play.

== Bibliography ==
- Burling, William J. A Checklist of New Plays and Entertainments on the London Stage, 1700-1737. Fairleigh Dickinson Univ Press, 1992.
- Dennison, Matthew. The First Iron Lady: A Life of Caroline of Ansbach. HarperCollins, 2017.
