= I puritani =

Opera by Vincenzo Bellini

- Opera by Vincenzo Bellini
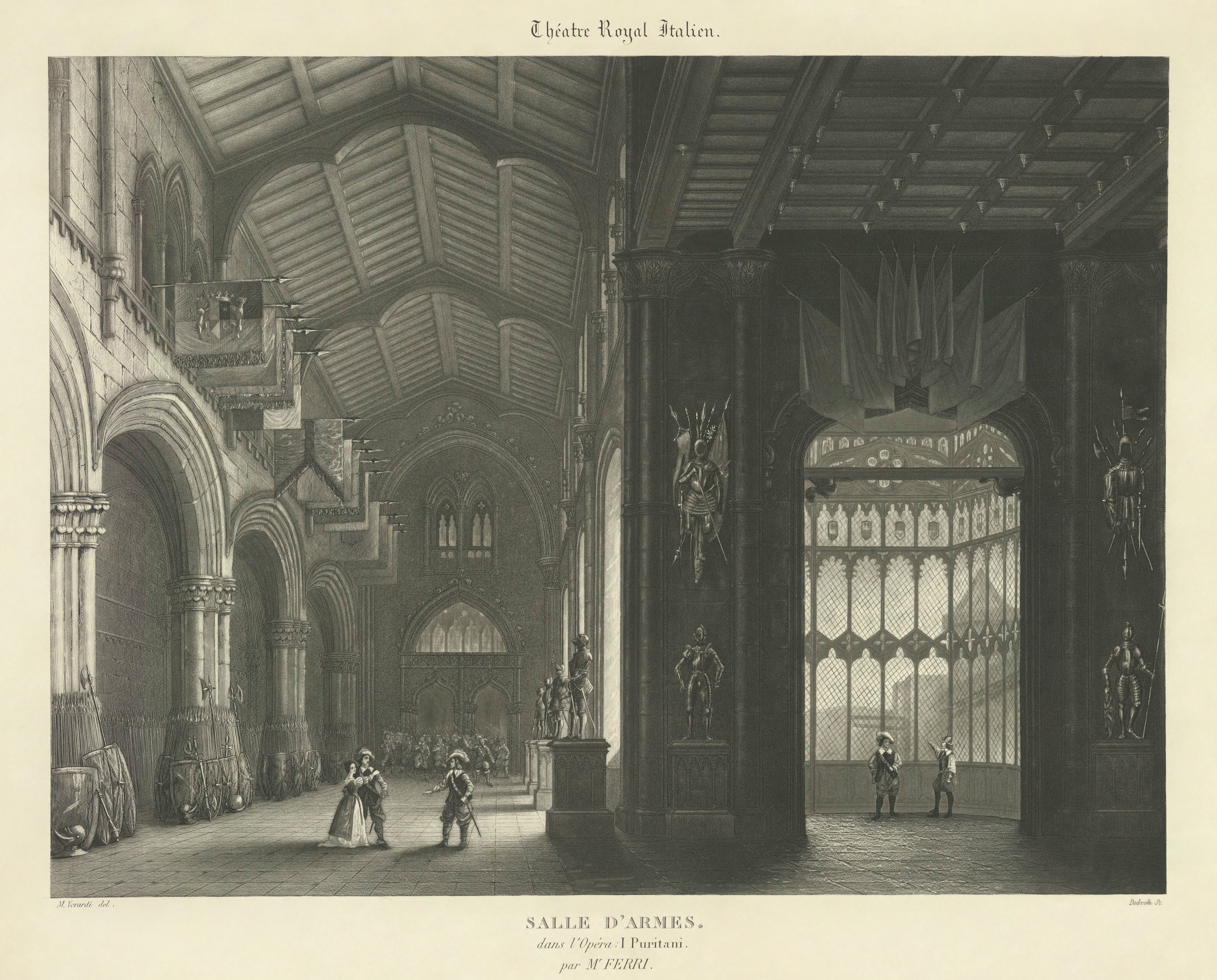
- The Hall of Arms (act 1, scene 3) in the original 1835 production
- Librettist: Carlo Pepoli
- Language: Italian
- Based on: Têtes Rondes et Cavalieres by Jacques-François Ancelot and Joseph Xavier Saintine
- Premiere: 24 January 1835; Théâtre-Italien, Paris

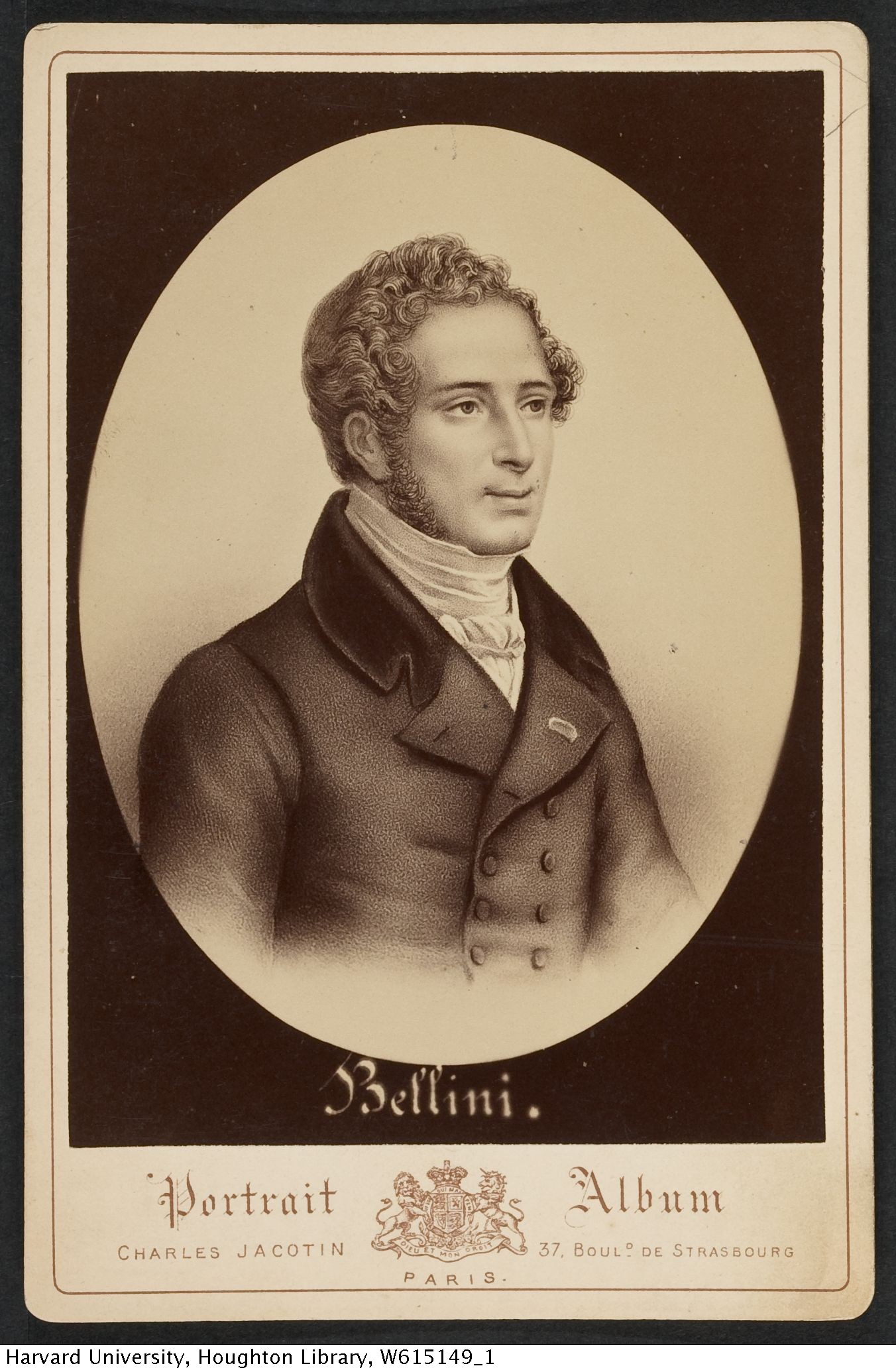
Vincenzo Bellini

I puritani (The Puritans) is an 1835 opera by Vincenzo Bellini. It was originally written in two acts and changed to three acts before the premiere on the advice of Gioachino Rossini, with whom the young composer had become friends. The music was set to a libretto by Count Carlo Pepoli, an Italian émigré poet whom Bellini had met at a salon run by the exile Princess Belgiojoso, which became a meeting place for many Italian revolutionaries. The opera is based on Têtes Rondes et Cavaliers (Roundheads and Cavaliers), a historical play written by Jacques-François Ancelot and Joseph Xavier Saintine and set in the English Civil War. Except for its title, the opera is not in any way based on Walter Scott's 1816 novel Old Mortality (translated into Italian in 1825 as I Puritani di Scozia), despite some claims to the contrary.

When Bellini arrived in Paris in mid-August 1833, he had intended to stay only about three weeks, the main aim being to continue the negotiations with the Paris Opéra which he had begun on his way to London a few months earlier. These negotiations came to nothing, but by October he had decided to spend the winter in Paris, especially as both Il pirata and I Capuleti e i Montecchi were to be given by the Théâtre-Italien that season. The offer from the Théâtre came in January 1834; he accepted because "the pay was richer than what I had received in Italy up to then, though only by a little; then because of so magnificent a company; and finally so as to remain in Paris at others' expense."

Taking from April until its premiere the following January, Bellini had time to ensure that the opera was as close to perfection as possible. After the premiere, Bellini reported to his friend Francesco Florimo in Naples that:

The French had all gone mad; there were such noise and such shouts that they themselves were astonished at being so carried away ... In a word, my dear Florimo, it was an unheard of thing, and since Saturday, Paris has spoken of it in amazement

It was to be Bellini's final work; he died in September 1835 at the age of 33.

== Composition history ==
=== Search for a suitable source for a libretto ===
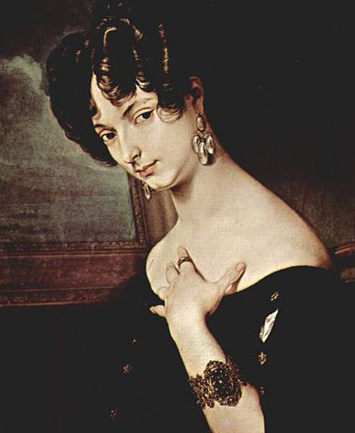
Cristina Trivulzio Belgiojoso 1832, by Francesco Hayez (detail)

Upon his arrival in Paris, Bellini quickly entered into the fashionable world of the Parisian salons, including that run by Princess Belgiojoso whom he had met in Milan. In addition to the many writers of the time, among the musical figures which he would have encountered were several Italians such as Michele Carafa and Luigi Cherubini, then in his seventies. Thus, for most of the remainder of 1833, Bellini's musical activity was very limited. He pleaded guilty in the letter to Florimo in March 1834 noting that the city's attractions were immense.

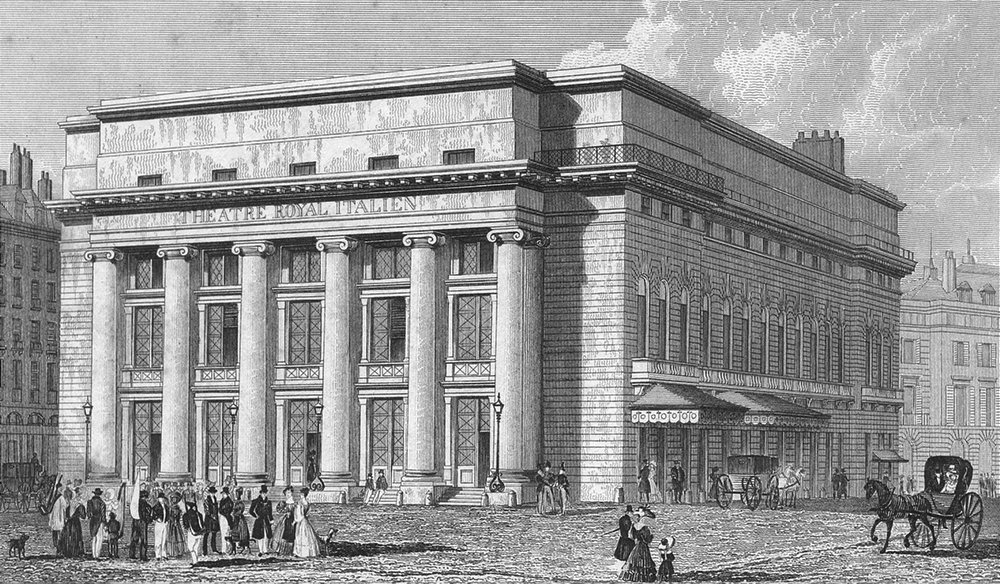
In 1829 the Théâtre-Italien was performing in the first Salle Favart

The contract to write a new opera for the Théâtre-Italien, which was signed in January 1834, called for it to be presented at the end of that year. Once it was signed, Bellini began to look around for a suitable subject and, in a letter to Florimo of 11 March 1834, he expresses some frustrations, noting: "I am about to lose my mind over the plot of the opera for Paris, as it has been impossible to find a suitable subject for my purpose and adaptable to the company".

In the same letter he tells of working towards finding a subject with the Italian émigré, Count Pepoli, who had not written a libretto before. However, on 11 April he is able to say in a letter to Ferlito that he was well and that "I have chosen the story for my Paris opera; it is of the times of Cromvello [Cromwell], after he had King Charles I of England beheaded." The chosen source of the libretto was identified as a play performed in Paris only six months before in September 1833. When first shown the play and other possible subjects by Pepoli, in the opinion of writer William Weaver, "it was clearly the heroine's madness that attracted the composer and determined his choice.

=== Working with Pepoli ===
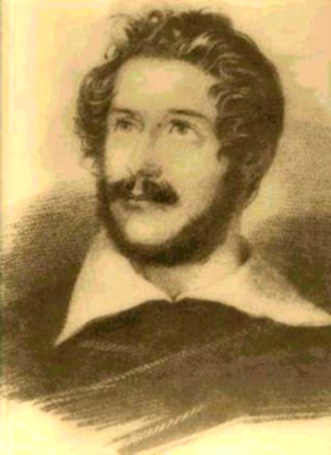
Librettist Carlo Pepoli

In his letter to Ferlito of 11 April, Bellini provides a synopsis of the opera, indicating that his favourite singers, Giulia Grisi, Luigi Lablache, Giovanni Battista Rubini, and Antonio Tamburini, would all be available for the principal roles, and that he would begin to write the music by 15 April if he had received the verses. Before the collaboration had got underway and initially impressed by the quality of Pepoli's verses in general, Bellini had prepared the way for his librettist by providing him with a scenario of thirty-nine scenes (thus compressing the original drama into manageable proportions), reducing the number of characters from nine to seven and at the same time, giving them names of a more Italianate, singable quality.

But a month later, he comments to Florimo on what it takes working on the libretto with Pepoli: "keeping [Pepoli] moving ahead costs me a lot of weariness; he lacks practice which is a great thing [to have]." For Bellini, the process of both overseeing the writing of the libretto and working with Pepoli was a struggle, added to by a period of illness. But, to balance the situation, William Weaver comments that "to some extent Bellini could compensate for Pepoli's deficiencies with his own first-hand theatrical experience" and suggests that some of that experience had been "acquired from Romani."

Continuing to work on the yet-unnamed I puritani, Bellini moved from central Paris, and at some time in the late Spring (specific date unknown) Bellini wrote to Pepoli to remind him that he should bring his work with him the following day "so that we can finish discussing the first act, which...will be interesting, magnificent, and proper poetry for music in spite of you and all your absurd rules..." At the same time, he laid out one basic rule for the librettist to follow:

Carve into your head in adamantine letters: The opera must draw tears, terrify people, make them die through singing

By late June, there had been considerable progress and, in a letter copied into one written to Florimo on 25 July, Bellini writes in reply to Alessandro Lanari, now the director of the Royal Theatres of Naples, telling him that the first act of Puritani is finished and that he expects to complete the opera by September, in order that he may then have time to write a new opera for Naples for the following year. Finally, Bellini stated that he did not want "to negotiate with anybody until I see what success my opera will have". This included a proposal from the Opéra-Comique in Paris for a new opera for that company.

When nothing came of negotiations with Naples for a new opera, Bellini composed an alternative version intended for the famous Maria Malibran, who was to sing Amina (in La sonnambula) at the Teatro di San Carlo in Naples in 1835. However, she died exactly a year to the day after the composer, and so this version was not performed on stage until 10 April 1986 at the Teatro Petruzzelli in Bari, with Katia Ricciarelli in the title role.

==== Critical reaction to Pepoli's work on Puritani ====
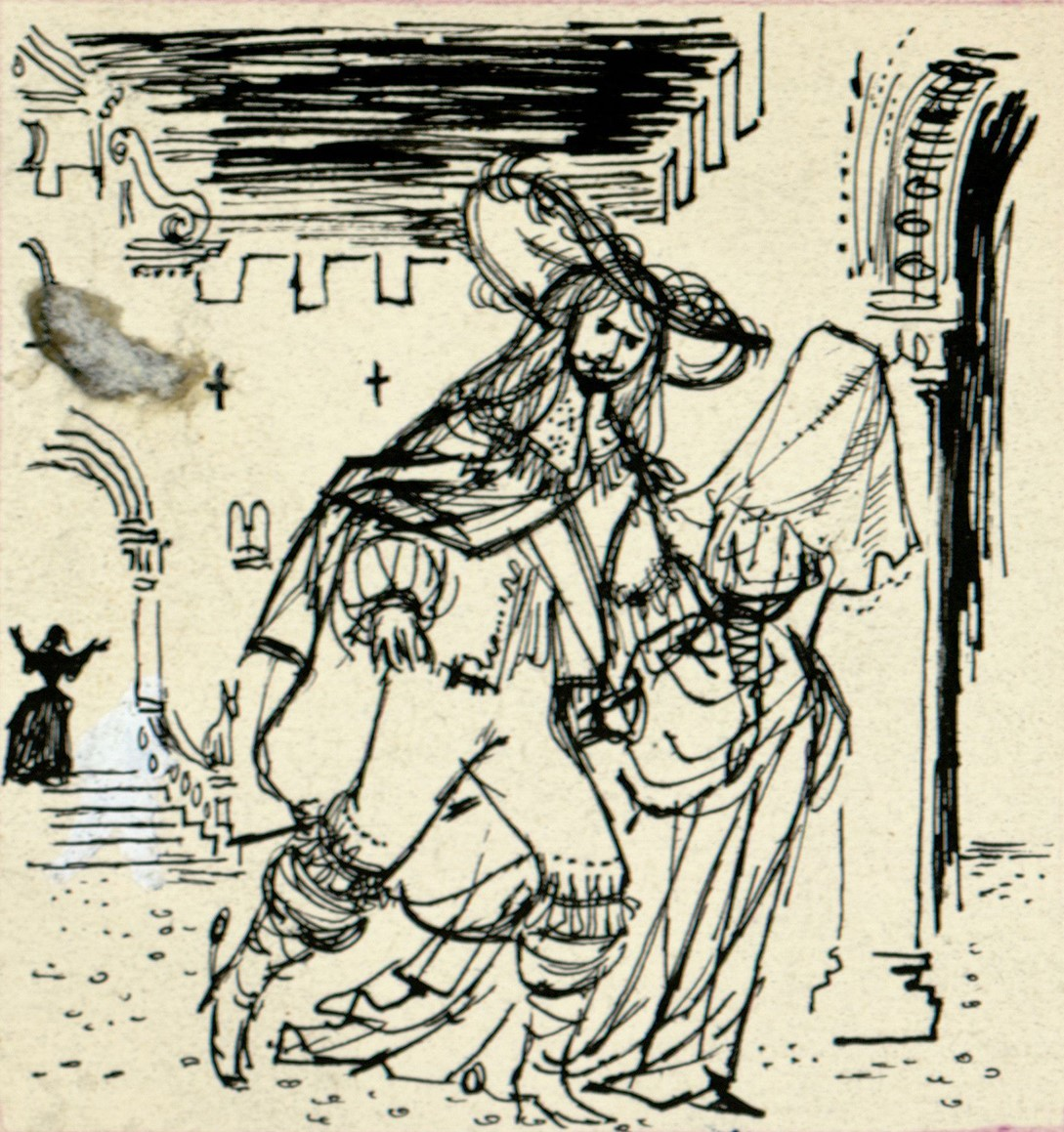
Drawing for a cover of I puritani (undated)

Given Bellini's own expressions of frustration at working with a new librettist for the first time, one musicologist, Mary Ann Smart, provides a different point of view in regard to Pepoli's approach to writing a libretto. Firstly, she addresses the issue of Pepoli's inexperience:

An address that Pepoli delivered to prize-winning students in Bologna in 1830 reveals not only a surprisingly broad grasp of operatic repertoire but also some forceful ideas about how music could provoke political feeling. Pepoli adopts a modern aesthetic agenda, condemning vocal ornamentation as a dilution of dramatic sense and attacking imitation as cheapening music's inherent, nonverbal language. After touching on exemplary passages from operas by Francesco Morlacchi, Nicola Vaccai, and Vincenzo Bellini, Pepoli turns to the "Marseillaise", arguing that it melds music and poetry perfectly to arouse feeling and provoke action.

Quoting Pepoli, Smart continues: "for this song [the "Marseillaise"] the people fight, win, triumph: Europe and the world shouted Liberty!". Smart then examines the relationship between Pepoli's 1830 views and how they appear to be manifested in what he wrote for I puritani:

The Italian phrase Pepoli uses here, [i.e. in discussing the "Marseillaise"] gridavano Libertà, strikingly anticipates the duet "Suoni la tromba" in I puritani, in which the two basses step outside of the opera's dreamy and non teleological plot for an isolated moment of patriotic fervor. For their homeland they will take up arms and gladly face death: Suoni la tromba, e intrepido/ Io pugnerò da forte/ Bello è affrontar la morte gridando "Libertà" ("Let the trumpet sound, and fearless I'll fight with all my strength. It is beautiful to face death shouting 'liberty')."

Then she recounts how Bellini reacted to what she describes as Pepoli's "hotheaded patriotism" which appears in librettist's poetry. When he wrote to Pepoli that his "liberal bent..terrifies me", Bellini's other concern, which proved to be correct, was that words such as libertà would have to be removed if the opera was to be performed in Italy.

Nevertheless, the Suoni la tromba which Bellini described as his "Hymn to Liberty" and which had initially been placed in the opera's first act was enthusiastically received by the composer: "My dear Pepoli, I hasten to express my great satisfaction with the duet I received by post this morning ... the whole is magnificent..."

=== Perceived competition from Donizetti ===
Around the middle of April 1834, Bellini became concerned when he learned that Gaetano Donizetti would be composing for the Théâtre-Italien during the same season as the one for which he was writing. According to Weinstock, quoting letters sent to Florimo in Italy at around that time (and continuing almost up to I puritani's premiere), Bellini perceived this to be a plot orchestrated by Rossini and expressed his frustrations in a long, rambling letter of 2,500 words to Florimo of 11 March 1834. As it transpired, Bellini's total success vastly outshone Donizetti's moderate one (Marin Faliero, given in March 1835, two months after I puritani).

=== The score is completed ===
By September Bellini was writing to Florimo of being able to "polish and re-polish" in the three remaining months before rehearsals and he expresses happiness with Pepoli's verses ("a very beautiful trio for the two basses and La Grisi") and by around mid-December he had submitted the score for Rossini's approval.

Rossini is known to have recommended one change to the placement of the "Hymn to Liberty", which had initially appeared in the first act but which Bellini had already realised could not remain in its written form if the opera was to be given in Italy. Instead of two acts, with the "Hymn" appearing midway in the second act, Rossini proposed that it be a three-act opera with Suoni la tromba ending act 2, arguing that the effect would always be likely to create an ovation, something which he rightly foretold.

Throughout his stay in Paris, Bellini had cultivated the older composer and had maintained a friendship with him: "I have always adored Rossini, and I succeeded, and happily ... [having] tamed Rossini's [perceived] hatred, I no longer was frightened and finished that work of mine which won me so much honour". Later, the successful dress rehearsal, he wrote: "... my very dear Rossini ... now loves me as a son".

With rehearsals planned for late December/early January, the dress rehearsal took place on 20 January 1835. It was attended by "all of high society, all the great artists, and everyone most distinguished in Paris were in the theatre, enthusiastic." Bellini's ecstatic letter to Florimo which followed the dress rehearsal recounts the enthusiastic reception of many of the numbers throughout the performance, most especially the second act bass duet, so that, by its end:

The French had all gone mad; there were such noise and such shouts that they themselves were astonished at being so carried away ... In a word, my dear Florimo, it was an unheard of thing, and since Saturday, Paris has spoken of it in amazement ... I showed myself to the audience, which shouted as if insane ... How satisfied I am! [He concludes by noting the success of the singers]: "Lablache sang like a god, Grisi like a little angel, Rubini and Tamburini the same."

It was upon Rossini's advice and after the dress rehearsal that the opera was changed from two acts to three, the second act ending after the Suoni la tromba duet for the two basses.

The premiere, postponed by two days, took place on 24 January 1835.

== Performance history ==
19th century

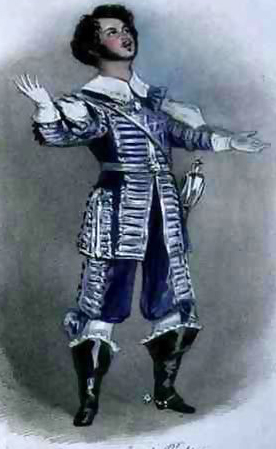
Rubini as Arturo in I puritani, Paris 1835

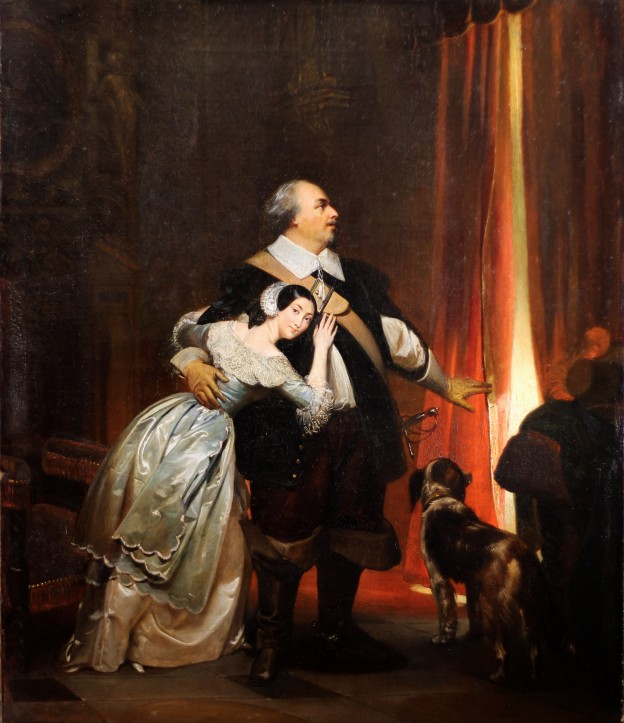
Grisi and Lablache in I puritani, King's Theatre, London, 1835

The opera became "the rage of Paris" and was given 17 performances to end the season on 31 March.

Herbert Weinstock's chapter on I puritani devotes four pages to details of performances which followed the premiere in Paris, although the Théâtre-Italien gave it over 200 times up to 1909. In 1835, London saw it in May, La Scala (in what Weinstock thinks of as a "pirate edition") in December. In Palermo it was given as Elvira e Arturo during the following season and La Fenice presented it in April 1836 as I puritani e i cavalieri with Giuseppina Strepponi as Elvira. It took until January 1837 before it was seen at the San Carlo in Naples; Messina saw it in 1838. Weinstock recounts details of hundreds more, including being given in Rome in 1836 as Elvira Walton, and during that year he details performances in Berlin, Vienna, Madrid, and Bologna (with Giulia Grisi as Elvira). Between 1836 and 1845 (with no details provided before 20th century performances are discussed), the opera was presented every year in different cities.

20th century and beyond

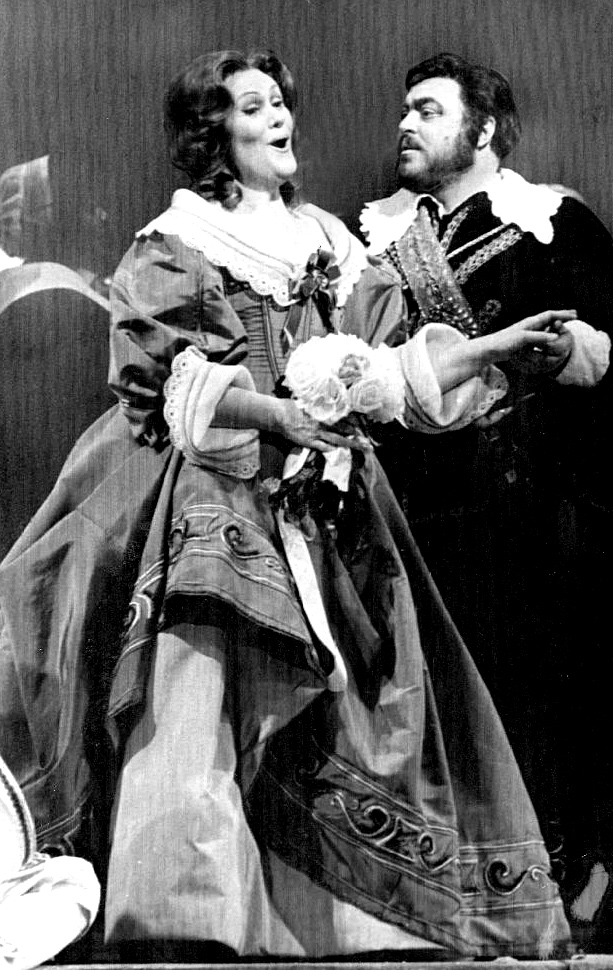
Joan Sutherland and Luciano Pavarotti, 1976 performance at the Metropolitan Opera

Details from 1906 forward are provided by Weinstock. In that year the opera appeared at the Manhattan Opera House in New York, followed by stagings at the Metropolitan Opera in February 1917, but in New York it was not revived for many years. Various performances are reported to have taken place in 1921, 1933, 1935, and 1949 in different European cities, but it was not until 1955 in Chicago that Puritani re-appeared in America with Maria Callas and Giuseppe Di Stefano in the major roles. The 1960s saw a variety of performances in the years between 1960 (Glyndebourne Festival with Joan Sutherland which was recorded) and 1969 when Weinstock's account ends. However, he does include a section on performances from the 19th century forward at the Royal Opera House in London up to Joan Sutherland's 1964 assumption of the role of Elvira. The article's "Recordings" section indicates some other performances which may have been recordings of live performances, although the one DVD from the Metropolitan Opera in January 2007 came from a Metropolitan Opera Live in HD presentation.

Welsh National Opera put on Puritani at the New Theatre, in Cardiff, in 1982. That performance was directed by Jonathan Eaton and produced by Andrei Serban and revived for the Royal Opera House in London in 1992.

In 2025 the Metropolitan Opera again staged Puritani in a new production directed by Charles Edwards featuring Lisette Oropesa in the role of Elvira, Lawrence Brownlee as Arturo, and Artur Ruciński as Riccardo. In 2026, Oropesa returned to the role of Elvira in a new production directed by Richard Jones for the Royal Opera House in London. This was the first new performance of the opera in Covent Garden since Franco Zeffirelli's production of 1964.

== Roles ==
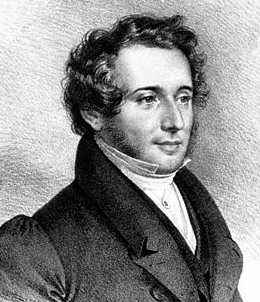
Antonio Tamburini sang Riccardo – Lithograph by Josef Kriehuber

Roles, voice types, premiere cast
Role	Voice type	Premiere cast, 24 January 1835
Lord Arturo Talbo	tenor	Giovanni Battista Rubini
Elvira, betrothed to Arturo	soprano	Giulia Grisi
Sir Riccardo Forth, the Puritan leader in love with Elvira	baritone	Antonio Tamburini
Sir Giorgio Valton, Elvira's uncle	bass	Luigi Lablache
Lord Gualtiero Valton, Elvira's father and Giorgio's brother	bass	Luigi Profeti
Sir Bruno Roberton	tenor	M. Magliano
Enrichetta di Francia, widow of Charles I	mezzo-soprano	Maria Amigo
Soldiers, heralds, armigers, Puritans, lords and ladies, pages, servants

== Synopsis ==
Place: England during the English Civil War
Time: 1640s

=== Act 1 ===
Scene 1: A fortress near Plymouth, commanded by Lord Gualtiero Valton

At daybreak, the Puritan soldiers gather in anticipation of victory over the Royalists. Prayers are heard from within, and then shouts of joy as the ladies and gentlemen of the castle come out announcing news of Elvira's wedding. Left alone, Riccardo shares with Bruno his plight: Riccardo had been promised Elvira's hand in marriage by her father Lord Valton but, returning to Plymouth the previous evening, he has found that she is in love with Arturo (a Royalist), and will marry him instead. He confides in Bruno. (Aria: Ah! Per sempre ...Bel sogno beato / "Ah! Forever have I lost you, flower of love, oh my hope; ah! life from now on will be full of sorrow".) As he pours out his sorrows to Bruno, Riccardo is called upon by his soldiers to lead them but he declares "I am aflame, but the flame is love, not glory".

Scene 2: Elvira's apartments

Elvira welcomes Giorgio, her uncle. He treats her with fatherly love, but when he tells her that she will soon be married, she is horror-struck. (Aria, then extended duet: Sai com'arde in petto mio / bella fiamma onnipossente / "You know that my breast burns with overwhelming passion".) She continues, stating a determination never to be married. But when Giorgio tells her that her cavalier, Arturo, will be coming, he reveals that it was he who persuaded her father, Lord Valton, to grant Elvira's wish. She is overjoyed. Then the sound of trumpets is heard announcing Arturo's arrival; he is welcomed by all.

Scene 3: The Hall of Arms

Arturo and his squires come into the hall and are joined by Elvira, Valton, Giorgio and the ladies and gentlemen of the castle. After a general welcome from all assembled, Arturo expresses his new-found happiness. (Aria, Arturo; then Giorgio and Valton; then all assembled: A te, o cara / amore talora / "In you beloved, love led me in secrecy and tears, now it guides me to your side".)

Valton tells everyone that he will not be able to attend the wedding ceremony and he provides Arturo with a safe conduct pass. A mysterious lady appears, and Valton tells her that he will be escorting her to London to appear before Parliament. Arturo is curious. Giorgio tells him that she is suspected of being a Royalist spy. As Elvira leaves to prepare herself for the wedding and the others depart in various directions, Arturo hangs back and finds the mysterious lady alone. He discovers that she is Enrichetta (Henrietta Maria), widow of the executed King Charles I. Insisting that she not be concerned about Elvira, Arturo vows to save her: (Aria, Arturo; then Enrichetta; then together: Non parlar di lei che adoro, / di valor non mi spogliar / "Do not speak of her whom I adore; do not take away my courage. You shall be saved, oh unhappy woman.")

Observed by Arturo and Enrichetta, Elvira appears singing a joyful polonaise (Son vergin vezzosa / "I am a pretty maiden dressed for her wedding"), but she engages the Queen in conversation asking for help with the ringlets of her hair. To allow that to happen, she removes her wedding veil and places it over Enrichetta's head. Both Arturo and Enrichetta realise that this may allow them to escape, and as they proceed, they are challenged by Riccardo who believes the woman to be Elvira. He almost provokes a fight with Arturo until he discovers that she is not Elvira; then, he is content to allow them to pass, swearing not to reveal any information.

When the wedding party enters, they ask for Arturo, then learn, largely from Riccardo, that he has fled with Enrichetta. Pursuit is organised. Becoming increasingly distraught, Elvira believes that she sees Arturo: (Aria; then ensemble: Oh, vieni al tempio, fedele Arturo / "Ah! come, ah! come! Oh! come to the church, faithful Arturo"). It is increasingly clear that she has gone mad.

=== Act 2 ===
A room in the fortress

As the ladies and gentlemen of the castle are mournful for Elvira's totally downcast state of mind, Giorgio describes her madness: (Aria: Cinta di fiori / "Garlanded with flowers and with her lovely hair disheveled, sometimes the beloved maiden wanders about...") and he describes her flights into madness and her pleas for Arturo to return. Riccardo brings the news that Arturo is now a fugitive who has been condemned to death by Parliament for allowing Enrichetta to escape. Giorgio states that the only hope for Elvira will be a sudden joyous experience. Elvira is heard outside, still deranged but longing for Arturo: "Either give me back hope, let me die" she cries. As she enters, she expresses all her longing in a mad scene: Elvira, aria: Qui la voce ... / "Here his sweet voice called me...and then vanished. Here he swore to be true, here he swore it, and then, cruel man, he fled!".

Entering, she confronts her uncle and Riccardo, whom she fails to recognise, even in her moments of lucidity. She addresses him as if he were Arturo: (Elvira, cabaletta: Vien, diletto, è in ciel la luna / "Come, beloved, the moon is in the sky, Everything is silent, until the dawn breaks in the sky"). The two men encourage Elvira to return to her room.

For Elvira's sake, Giorgio encourages Riccardo to help save his rival, advising that he will forever be pursued by their phantoms. Riccardo rejects the request: (Giorgio, then Riccardo, then duet: Il rival salvar tu déi, / il rival salvar tu puoi / "You must save your rival, you can save your rival"), but gradually Riccardo comes around to accept that idea. However, he states that if in the following day's battle, Arturo appears, he will perish at his hand. The two men now have an agreement: (Finale: Giorgio, then Riccardo, then together: Suoni la tromba / "Let the battle-cry be: country, victory, and honour. Let the trumpets sound, and I shall fight strongly, fearlessly").

=== Act 3 ===
A wooded area near the fortress, three months later

Arturo is still on the run. He is exhausted and has returned seeking Elvira. Suddenly he hears the sounds of singing coming through the woods: (Elvira, aria: A una fonte afflitto e solo / s'assideva un trovator / "A troubadour sat sad and lonely by a fountain"). He calls out, but gets no response and, recalling how the couple used to sing together in the woods, he also sings the troubadour melody until the sound of drumbeats and the shouting of soldiers silences him. He covers himself and hides as a group of soldiers passes, then emerges and decides to continue singing to the same melody: (Arturo, aria: Corre a valle, corre a monte / l'esiliato pellegrin / "Through the valleys, over the mountains, hastens the exiled pilgrim")

Unseen, Elvira emerges from the trees and stops to listen. She is saddened when the singing stops, and she sorrowfully wonders where Arturo is. Suddenly, he is standing before her and they are reunited in a spirited duet in which they declare that they will always be together after the long months of being apart. Still a little confused, Elvira believes that Arturo has married the woman whom he escorted from the fortress; he assures Elvira that he has always loved her, that the lady who was in great danger was the queen. Having determined that they love each other and that they will always remain together, they enter into an ecstatic duet. (Arturo: Vieni fra queste braccia / "Come, come to my arms"; Elvira: Caro, caro, non ho parole / "Dearest, dearest, I cannot find the words to express my happiness"; then together).

At the sound of drums being heard, Elvira appears to be returning to a state of madness, fearing that they will again be parted. Then soldiers' voices are heard close by and Riccardo, Giorgio, and the ladies and gentlemen of the fortress enter announcing Arturo's death sentence. With that, she finally comes to her senses.

An ensemble, beginning with Arturo (Credeasi, misera / "Unhappy girl, she believed that I had betrayed her") extends to all assembled, each expressing his or her anguish, with even Riccardo being moved by the plight of the lovers. For this extended piece, Bellini wrote a high F-natural above C_{5} for Arturo's ... crudeli, crudeli! / Ella è tremante, / ella è spirante; / anime perfide, / sorde a pietà! / "cruel men, cruel men! She is trembling, she is fainting, perfidious souls, deaf to pity!"

The soldiers continue to demand Arturo's execution, but the sounds of a herald arriving are heard. He brings letters which are opened by Riccardo and Giorgio. They announce that although the Royalists have been defeated, Oliver Cromwell has pardoned all prisoners. The ensemble expresses its general and its personal joy.

== Music ==
Two specific examples of Bellini's distinctive musical style appear in this opera.

In act 3, an ensemble (Credeasi, misera) develops, during which Bellini writes an in alt F-natural above C_{5} for Arturo. Most tenors would typically sing a D-flat instead of an F. However some tenors, like Nicolai Gedda, William Matteuzzi, Gregory Kunde, Francesco Demuro and Alasdair Kent, did manage to tackle the challenging high F. In the seldom performed Malibran version, it is Elvira (i.e., the soprano) who sings, in a higher octave, the principal part of Credeasi, misera.

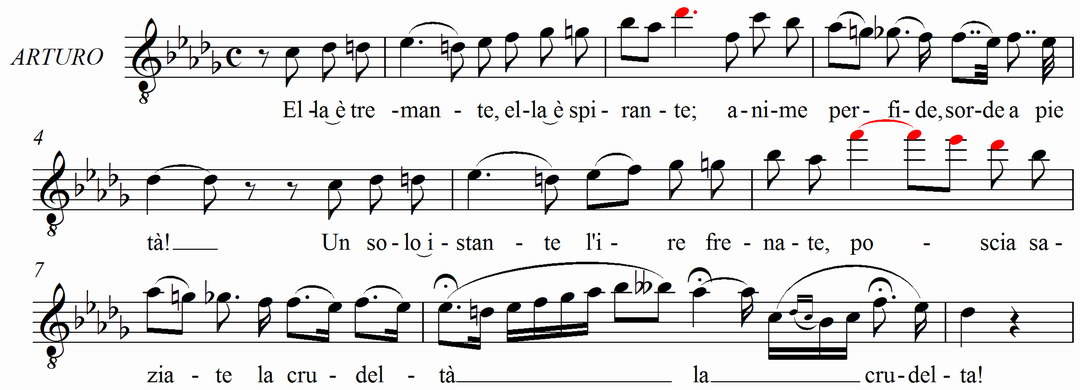
An excerpt from "Credeasi, misera", act 3. The notes highlighted (above the high C) are among the highest demanded in tenor operatic repertoire and are usually sung falsetto or altogether transposed.

In regard to the impact of the act 2 finale number and its significance in librettist Carlo Pepoli's work as well as in Bellini's music so far, Mary Ann Smart provides one explanation for the power of Suoni la tromba by referring to work of another musicologist, Mark Everist, who, she states "has plausibly suggested that the frenzy was provoked more by the buzzing energy of the two bass voices combined, an unprecedented sonority at the time, than by the duet's political message".

But, she continues to analyse other aspects of the duet:

We should also factor in the force of Pepoli's verses with their promotion of martyrdom and the utter regularity of the music's march-like phrasing, rare in Bellini's ethereal style. Suoni la tromba is a perplexing historical anomaly: an almost isolated example of an extroverted, overtly political statement heard at the Théâtre-Italien, and an equally rare link between Pepoli's political persona and his role as poet-for-hire. But such overt calls for revolution represent just one possible 'political' style. They are not necessarily the most forceful or influential variety of intervention.

== Cultural references ==
I puritani, to which she referred as "dear Puritani", was Queen Victoria's favourite opera and the first which she attended in the company of Prince Albert before their marriage. The 2009 film The Young Victoria includes an episode in which Albert and Victoria discuss the opera, as well as a scene showing Victoria attending a performance.

In the film Fitzcarraldo, the cast of I puritani are being transported on Fitzcarraldo's boat. They perform parts of the opera in full costume and sing "A te, o cara" (from act 1, scene 3) as Fitzcarraldo makes his triumphal return to Iquitos.
