= Carlo Pepoli =

Italian politician

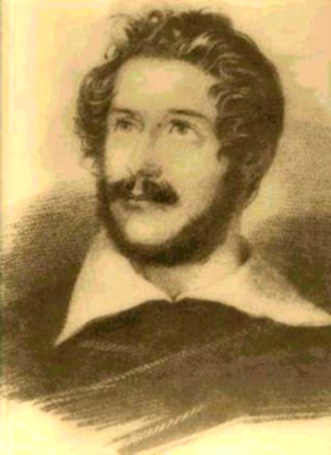
Carlo Pepoli as a young man

Count Carlo Pepoli (22 July 1796 – 7 December 1881) was an Italian politician and journalist. He was also acclaimed as a poet, his most well-known work being the libretto for Vincenzo Bellini's final opera, I puritani which was given its premiere in Paris in January 1835.

Born in Bologna to the aristocratic Pepoli family, he was active in the movement opposing Austrian rule of Italy before being imprisoned and forced into exile in France after 1831. He spent a large portion of his adult life as an exile in both Paris, where he initially taught Italian. He also lived in England, where between 1839 and 1848, he was "Professore di Letteratura italiana" at University College, London. He returned to Italy briefly in 1848, then from 1859 resumed his political activities which continued to within a year of his death which took place in 1881 in his native city at the age of 85.

== Political activity in Italy ==
Smart describes his activities in both Italy and France, and the connections between them, as follows:

Perhaps the most important link between the aristocratic world of the Théâtre-Italien [in Paris in the 1830s] and that of the political exiles [in that city] was the poet Carlo Pepoli.....The oldest son and heir of a prominent Bolognese land-owning family, Pepoli fell in with the revolutionary generation of the 1820s and served in the provisional government that briefly held power in the province of Romagna after the 1831 uprising. When the rebellion was quashed, the positions Pepoli had held as head of the Guarda provinciale and as prefect for the cities of Pesaro and Urbino earned him imprisonment in the Spielberg, a sentence that was commuted to exile thanks to French intervention.

Pepoli had married Elizabeth Fergus in England and, they returned to Italy for a short time in 1848 where he was commissioner with civil and military powers in Rome and a Deputy of the Roman Assembly.

With the ending of Austrian rule, he was able to return to Italy in 1859 and, with the country close to unification, he became a professor at the University of Bologna in 1860 and was elected deputy of the Constituent Assembly of Romagna, again becoming politically active up to 1880, serving as the mayor of Bologna from 1862 to 1866, and as a Senator of the Kingdom of Italy.

== Activities in Paris ==
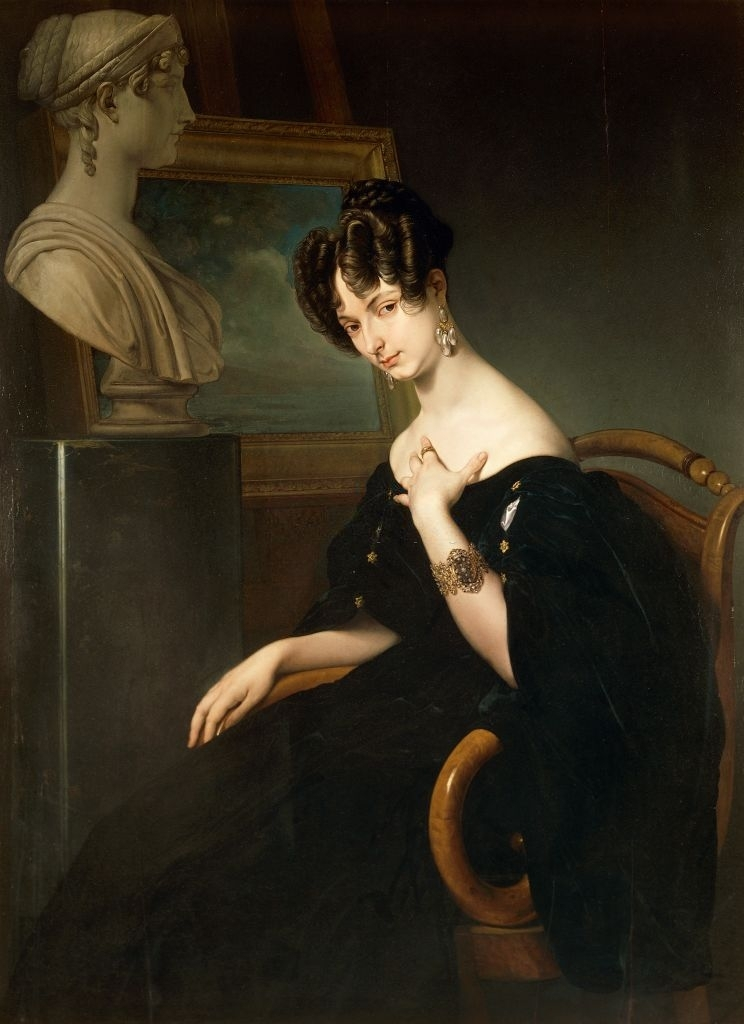
Portrait of Cristina Trivulzio Belgiojoso by Francesco Hayez, 1831

Smart notes that "once he arrived in Paris he renewed his acquaintance with Gioachino Rossini and took on a few libretto commissions to supplement his main income as a tutor of Italian." Of these, he became best known for the libretto he prepared for Bellini's I puritani, written between 1834 and its premiere in January 1835.

In Paris from 1832, he contributed to L'Esule, the newspaper of the Italian exiles printed in Paris and he is known to have been a part of one of the most important salons of these years, which became a meeting place for Italian revolutionaries such as Vincenzo Gioberti, Niccolò Tommaseo, and Camillo Cavour. It was run by the exile Princess Belgiojoso who "was by far the most overtly political of the salonnières. Like Carlo Pepoli, she lived in Paris under duress", states Smart. Bellini quickly became involved with the princess' salon after his arrival in 1833 and it is there that he met Pepoli.

Along with the major operatic work, Smart notes that Pepoli "picked up" additional work including writing the poetry for two sets of song cycles, one each for Rossini (in 1835) and for the Italian composer Saverio Mercadante in 1836: Smart sees "the link between the two collections [as being] revealed first of all by their titles: Rossini's rather generic Soirées musicales becomes in Mercadante's hands the more evocative Soirées italiennes". In addition, the Rossini set is supplemented by four settings of texts by Metastasio.

German composer Georgina Schubert (1840-1878) also used Pepoli's text for her lieder "Barcarole."
