= Domenico Reina =

Swiss singer (1796–1843)

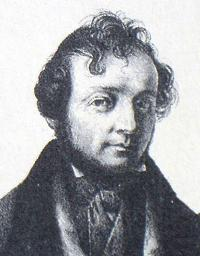
Tenor Domenico Reina

Domenico Reina (14 July 1796 – 29 July 1843) was a Swiss bel canto tenor, notable for creating roles in the operas of Vincenzo Bellini, Gaetano Donizetti, Saverio Mercadante, and other Italian composers.

He was born in Lugano, studied in Milan and made his operatic debut in 1820. He joined John Ebers's company at the King's Theatre, Haymarket and in 1823 sang in the first London performances of Gioachino Rossini's operas Ricciardo e Zoraide, La donna del lago and Matilde di Shabran.

Reina returned to Italy and sang in the theatres of Rome, Venice, Turin, Bologna, Parma and Livorno. At La Scala, Milan, he created in 1829 the leading role of Arturo in Bellini's La straniera, in 1834 that of Tamas in Donizetti's Gemma di Vergy and in 1835 that of Leicester in his Maria Stuarda. At the Teatro San Carlo, Naples, he created the role of Decio in Mercadante's La vestale in 1840. Other Mercadante operas in which Reina created roles were Il conte di Essex (La Scala, 1833), Uggero il danese (Bergamo, 1834) and La gioventù di Enrico V (La Scala, 1834).

Other composers in whose operas Reina sang at the first performances were:

- Carlo Coccia: Caterina di Guisa (1833), La figlia dell'arciere (1834)
- Giacomo Cordella and others: Il dono a Partenope (1840)
- Giuseppe Lillo: Cristina di Svezia (1841)
- Giovanni Pacini: Ivanhoe (1832), Irene ossia L'assedio di Messina (1833), Fernando duca di Valenza (1833)
- Cesare Pugni: Il disertore svizzero o La nostalgia (1831)
- Luigi Ricci: Annibale in Torino (1830), La neve (1831)
- Giuseppe Staffa: La battaglia di Navarino (1838).
- Nicola Vaccai: Giovanna Gray (1836)

In other operas by Bellini, he sang Pollione (Norma), Elvino (La sonnambula), Tebaldo (I Capuleti e i Montecchi) and Orombello (Beatrice di Tenda). His Donizetti roles included the title role in Roberto Devereux, Riccardo Percy (Anna Bolena), Alamiro (Belisario) and Fernando (Marino Faliero). In Rossini operas, he also sang Almaviva in The Barber of Seville, the title-roles in Otello and Maometto II, Antenore in Zelmira, Idreno in Semiramide, Osiride in Mosè in Egitto, Amenofi and Elisero in the revision (Mosè e Pharaone) and Norfolk in Elisabetta, regina d'Inghilterra. For other composers, he sang Comingio in Pacini's Adelaide e Comingio, Appio Diomede in his L'ultimo giorno di Pompeii and the title role in his Furio Camillo, Medoro in Stefano Pavesi's Ser Marcantonio and Pisano in Mercadante's Il bravo.

Domenico Reina died in Milan in 1843.
