= Giuseppe Bardari =

Giuseppe Bardari (27 May 1817 – 22 September 1861) was an Italian lawyer and writer. Although chiefly known today for having written the libretto for Donizetti's 1835 opera, Maria Stuarda, he played a prominent role in the judiciary of Naples in the years leading up to the unification of Italy.

== Biography ==
Pizzo, the small seaside town in southern Italy, where Giuseppe Bardari was born in 1817.

Giuseppe Bardari was born in Pizzo and studied in Monteleone (now Vibo Valentia) before going to Naples to study law. During his student days in Naples, he also wrote poetry and frequented the city's salons where he came into contact with the liberal ideals of the Italian Risorgimento. He earned a reputation as a promising literary figure and he was only 17 years old when Donizetti engaged him as the librettist for Maria Stuarda. It was Bardari's only known libretto. Ashbrook has speculated that the censorship problems he encountered (which resulted in the work being banned in Naples and demands for drastic changes in Milan) may have led him to pursue his legal career instead.

He returned to his law studies and eventually became a magistrate in Monteleone. However, he lost that position in 1848 following his anti-government activities during an uprising in Calabria. He returned to private practice as a lawyer and became a close friend of Liborio Romano, an important figure in the Risorgimento. Towards the end of Bourbon rule in southern Italy, he returned to public life and became the Prefect of Police for Naples. On 6 September 1860, he published a manifesto announcing the departure of King Francis II and his court, as Garibaldi and his troops advanced on the city. In his manifesto, he reminded the Neapolitans of their duties as citizens during the period of change, and urged them to remain calm and support the new government. According to Pagnotta, he was also the author of the King's own farewell proclamation to the Neapolitans, as well as his address to the nations of Europe.

After Naples finally fell under the control of Garibaldi on 7 September 1860, the provisional government appointed Bardari Councillor of the Gran Corte dei Conti (the financial court of Naples, similar in function to the French Cour des comptes). He was also appointed President of the commission administering the former assets of the Jesuit Order in the territory comprising the Kingdom of the Two Sicilies. Considered an Italian patriot by Garibaldi despite his service under Francis II, Giuseppe Bardari was on the brink of a new political career in the unified Kingdom of Italy when he died in Naples at the age of 44.

== Sources ==
- Ashbrook, William, Donizetti and His Operas, Cambridge University Press, 1983, pp. 583–584. ISBN 0-521-27663-2
- Atti del governo estratti dal giornale officiale di Napoli, Issues 1-27, 1860 (in Italian)
- Fagnano, Claudia, "Vicissitudini di un libretto perseguitato", Il Giornale dei Grandi Eventi, Anno XII, Numero 19–22, March 2006 (in Italian)
- Garibaldi, Giuseppe, Vita e memorie di Giuseppe Garibaldi, Santi Seraglini e Compagni, 1860 (in Italian)
- Pagnotta, Giuseppe Bardari, Giuseppe, 2006 (in Italian)
