= Ignazio Marini =

Italian opera singer

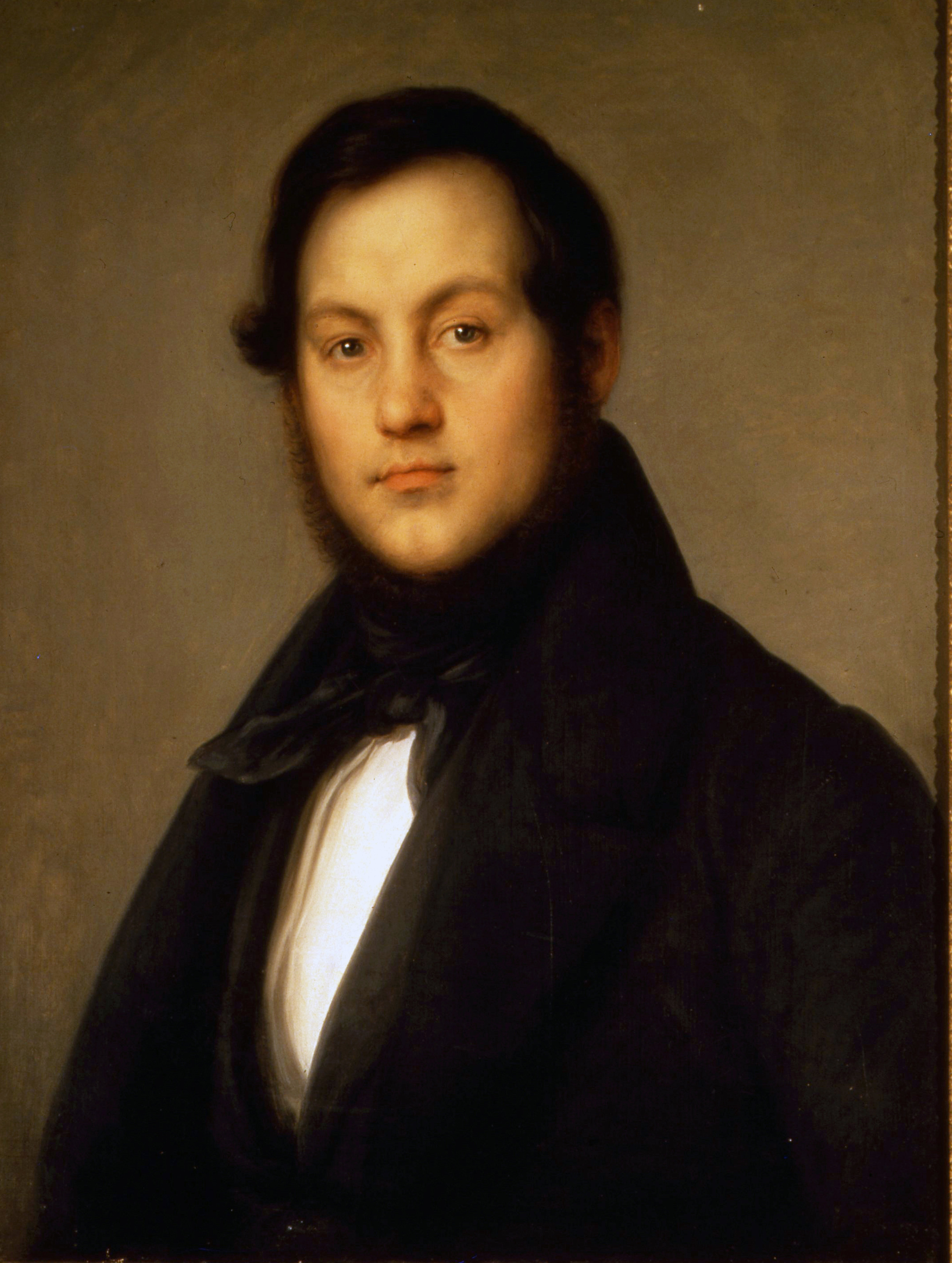
Bass Ignazio Marini

Ignazio Marini (28 November 1811 – 29 April 1873) was an Italian operatic bass. He sang in the world premieres of several operas by Gaetano Donizetti, Saverio Mercadante, and Giuseppe Verdi and appeared as a guest artist in major opera houses throughout Europe and in New York City, Mexico City and Cairo.

== Biography ==
Ignazio Marini was born in Tagliuno near Bergamo and made his stage debut in Brescia in 1832. In 1834 he became a principal singer at La Scala where he sang for the next thirteen years and created, amongst other roles, Guido in Donizetti's Gemma di Vergy (1834), Talbot in Donizetti's Maria Stuarda (1835), Enrico Gray in Vaccai's Giovanna Gray, and the title role in Verdi's Oberto (1839). He also created the title role in Verdi's Attila in its 1846 premiere at La Fenice and the Alcalde in the 1862 premiere of La forza del destino.

Marini died in Milan in 1873 at the age of 61. His wife and frequent stage partner was the soprano Antonietta Marini-Rainieri.
