= Timoteo Pasini =

Italian composer

Timoteo Pasini (7 August 1829 – 13 June 1888) was an Italian composer, conductor, and pianist. He was born in Ferrara and died in Buenos Aires. Although no longer in the repertoire, his operas Imelda de' Lambertazzi and Giovanna Grey had considerable success in their day. His compositions in Buenos Aires included a funeral march for Giuseppe Garibaldi.

== Life and career ==
Pasini was born in Ferrara and studied first in his native city under Padre Francesco Zagagnoni (1767–1844), a former monk, then in Rome under Basili and in Naples under Mercadante. He was the chief conductor at the Teatro Comunale in Ferrara for many years as well as teaching singing there. In 1870 he was named the first director of the city's newly established music conservatory. He left that post in 1874 when he went to Montevideo to conduct operas at the Teatro Solis. He eventually settled in Buenos Aires where he continued to teach and compose until his death at the age of 59.

He composed two operas which were successful in their day, but are now forgotten. Imelda de' Lambertazzi (libretto by Camillo Boari) premiered in 1850 at the Teatro Bonacossi in Ferrara. Giovanna Grey (libretto by Giovanni Pennacchi) premiered in 1853 at Ferrara's Teatro Comunale. He also composed two Masses and many pieces of church music, marches, songs, fantasias, and piano transcriptions. In Argentina, he composed a funeral march for Giuseppe Garibaldi which was first played in Buenos Aires on 18 June 1882 by a 200 piece band.
