= Portrait of Cristina Trivulzio Belgiojoso =

Painting by Francesco Hayez

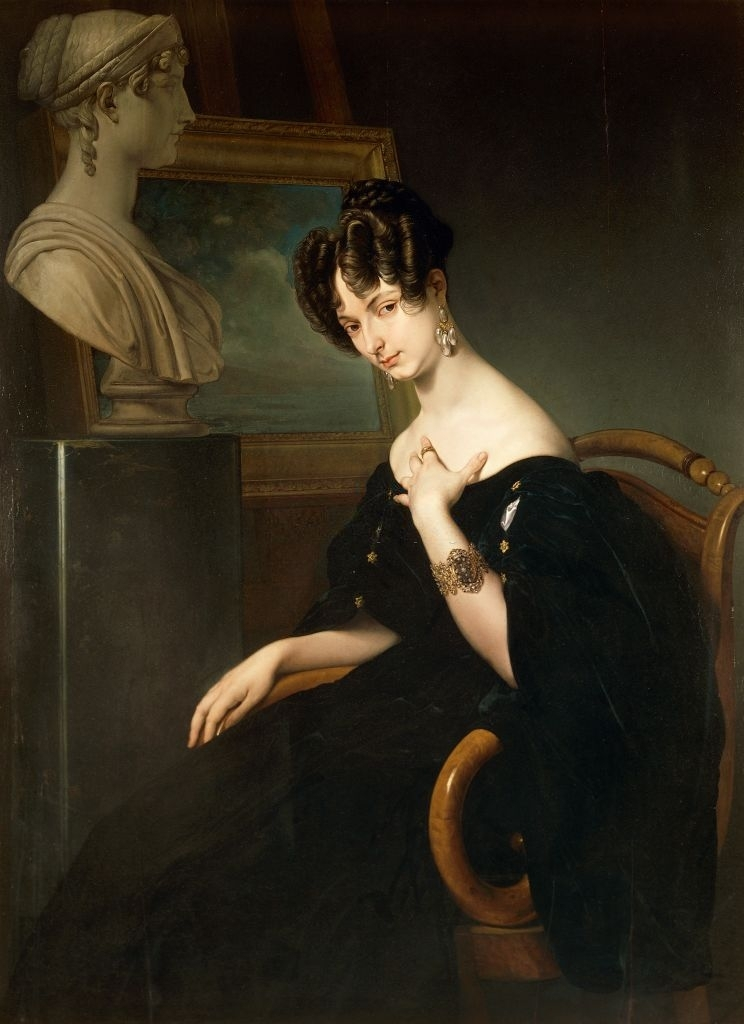
- Artist: Francesco Hayez
- Year: 1831
- Type: Oil on canvas, portrait painting
- Dimensions: 136 cm × 101 cm (54 in × 40 in)
- Location: Private collection

Portrait of Cristina Trivulzio Belgiojoso (Italian: Ritratto di Cristina Trivulzio Belgiojoso) is an 1831 portrait painting by the Italian artist Francesco Hayez. It depicts the Italian writer Cristina Trivulzio Belgiojoso. A noted campaigner for the Unification of Italy she was subsequently a supporter of the unsuccessful 1848 Revolution. Hayez was a leading figure in the Romantic movement based in Milan. It was displayed at the 1831 exhibition at the city's Pinacoteca di Brera. Today it is held in a private collection in Florence.

== Bibliography ==
- Gattey, Charles Neilson . A Bird of Curious Plumage: Princess Cristina Di Belgiojoso, 1808-1871. Constable, 1971.
- Mazzocca, Fernando . Francesco Hayez: catalogo ragionato. F. Motta, 1994.
- Fugazza, Mariachiara & Rorig, Karoline. La prima donna d'Italia. Cristina Trivulzio di Belgiojoso tra politica e giornalismo. FrancoAngeli, 2010.
