= Maria Stuarda =

Opera by Gaetano Donizetti

- Tragic opera by Gaetano Donizetti
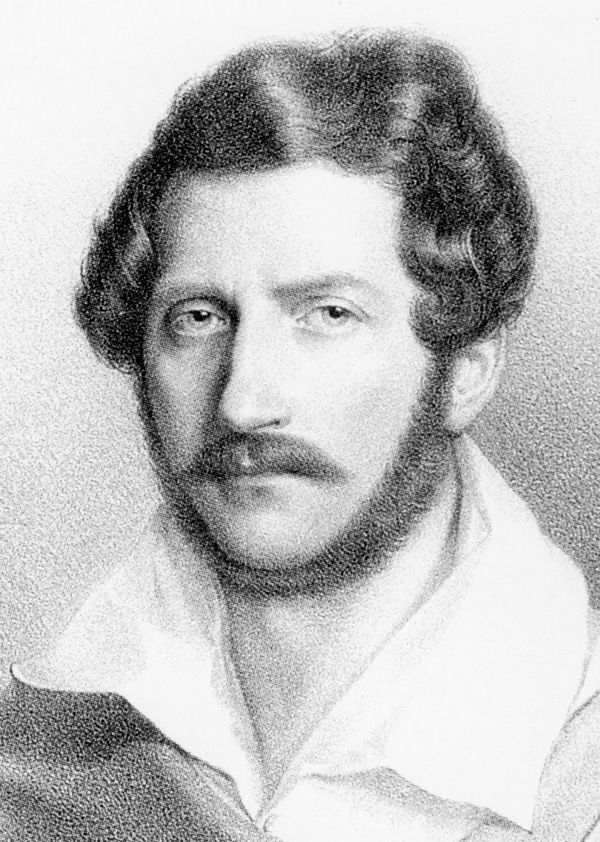
- The composer in 1835
- Librettist: Giuseppe Bardari
- Language: Italian
- Based on: Maria Stuart by Friedrich Schiller
- Premiere: 30 December 1835; La Scala, Milan

Maria Stuarda (Mary Stuart) is a tragic opera (tragedia lirica), in two acts, by Gaetano Donizetti, to a libretto by Giuseppe Bardari, based on Andrea Maffei's translation of Friedrich Schiller's 1800 play Maria Stuart.

The opera is one of a number of operas by Donizetti which deal with the Tudor period in English history, including Anna Bolena (named for Henry VIII's second wife, Anne Boleyn), Roberto Devereux (named for a putative lover of Queen Elizabeth I) and Il castello di Kenilworth. The lead female characters of the operas Anna Bolena, Maria Stuarda, and Roberto Devereux are often referred to as the "Three Donizetti Queens". The story is loosely based on the lives of Mary, Queen of Scots (Mary Stuart) and her cousin Queen Elizabeth I. Schiller had invented the confrontation of the two Queens, who in fact never met.

After a series of problems surrounding its presentation in Naples after the final dress rehearsal – including having to be re-written for a totally different location, a different time period, and with Buondelmonte as its new title – Maria Stuarda as we know it today premiered on 30 December 1835 at La Scala in Milan.

== Composition history ==
=== The appeal of Mary Stuart and Scottish history in 19th-century Italy ===
In a variety of areas – drama, literature (fiction or otherwise) – England in the Tudor era (and Scotland at the time of Mary Stuart and beyond in particular, Donizetti's own Lucia di Lammermoor being an example) exerted a fascination upon continental Europeans in an extraordinary way. In literature, it has been noted that more than 20,000 books have appeared about Mary's life and that, within two years of her death, stage plays also began to appear. In addition to Schiller's Maria Stuart, there had been another influential play, Count Vittorio Alfieri's Maria Stuarda written in 1778 in which "that unfortunate queen is represented unsuspicious, impatient of contradiction and violent in her attachments."

When it came to what had been handed down about Elizabeth I to Donizetti and other Italian composers, opera stage director Stephen Lawless notes that the continental view would have been very different from the Anglo-centric one of Elizabeth as Good Queen Bess, as Gloriana, and as the one who routed Catholicism from England's shores. But from an Italian perspective, Elizabeth was a heretic and, indeed, a bastard since "her father Henry VIII had never obtained an annulment from the Pope to end his marriage to Catherine of Aragon in order to marry his second wife (Elizabeth's mother) Anne Boleyn" Therefore, to European Catholics, Mary was a martyr and the legitimate ruler of England, a sympathetic character contrasted with Elizabeth, who was traditionally cast in a darker role, often "as unrestrainedly jealous, willful, and easily over-wrought. This is the portrait of Elizabeth found, not too unexpectedly, in Bardari's libretto".

As far as Italian opera of the primo ottocento is concerned, these attitudes found their way into the works which poured forth: they covered a large portion of the Tudor era, including works about Henry VIII's first daughter, Mary, who became Queen Mary I, known as "Bloody Mary" for enforcing the country's strict return to Catholicism. The appeal of these operas has been expressed by Professor Alexander Weatherson in the 2009 Donizetti Society Newsletter as follows (with the addition of relevant opera titles associated with the named composers):

Scotland’s soil was about to be profaned by a stream of operas that bore the footprint of [Elizabeth’s] rival……without Mary Stuart, Scotland might have been left in peace....In Italy alone in the earliest decades of the nineteenth century there was a Scotch broth of operas by Asap; Capecelatro; Carafa [I solitari di Scozia, 1815, and Elisabetta in Derbyshire ossia Il castello di Fotheringhay, 1818]; Carlini [Maria Stuarda, regina di Scozia, 1818]; Casalini; Casella [Maria Stuarda, 1812]; Coccia [I solitari, 1811, and Maria Stuart, regina di Scozia, 1827]; Donizetti [the subject of the Newsletter article]; Ferrari; [The Belgian], Fétis [Marie Stuart en Ecosse]; Gabrielli [Sara ovvero La pazza delle montagne di Scozia, 1843]; Mazzucato [La fidanzata di Lammermoor, 1834]; Mercadante [Maria Stuarda, regina di Scozia, 1825]; Neidermeyer [Marie Stuart, Paris 1844]; Nicolini; Pacini [Vallace, 1820, Malvina di Scozia]; Pavesi; Pugni; Rajentroph; the Ricchis [ Federico Ricci and Luigi Ricci ] [La prigione di Edimburgo, 1838]; Rossini [Elisabetta, regina d'Inghilterra, 1815]; Sogner [Maria Stuarda ossia I carbonari di Scozia, 1814]; and Vaccai [I solitari di Scozia, 1815] – and this is just a scratch upon the surface of the European infatuation with the decapitated Stuart and/or her northern fastness which boiled-up in the bloodbath finale of the eighteenth century, operas often rabid and inconsequential, full of fashionable confrontations and artificial conflicts, politically motivated, repetitious and soon forgotten.

But Weatherson concludes:

At the heart of the plot, however, lay an Italian, the pulp plays and novels of Camillo Federici (1749–1802) [the pen name of Giovanni Battista Viassolo] a former actor whose prolific vulgarizations of Schiller and August von Kotzebue set Italian librettists scribbling for four decades. Indeed, without him it is to be suspected that Sir Walter Scott would never have captured the imagination of so many poets, nor for so long.

=== The libretto for Maria Stuarda ===
Having seen Schiller's play in Milan in an Italian translation, Donizetti approached the famed librettist Felice Romani, who had written a successful libretto in 1830 for Anna Bolena, the opera which secured the composer's place as one of the leaders of his day. Wanting a strong and powerful subject for his new work, the composer's idea was to have Romani prepare a libretto about Mary Stuart, but the librettist appears to have ignored him, perhaps because of his desire to get away from writing for the theatre, which he increasingly found to be distasteful.

Therefore, the composer sought the services of Giuseppe Bardari (1817–1861), a seventeen-year-old law student with no experience, who became the librettist, thus giving Donizetti the opportunity to work closely with him, or to even write entire scenes himself and to greatly influence the structure of the work. Schiller's play had been translated into Italian by Andrea Maffei (who also translated a number of others as well) and it was this translation upon which Bardari relied. Although he was forced to eliminate "almost all of the play's political and religious references and (reduce) the number of characters from 21 to six, the libretto does adds the love story of Mary Stuart and Robert Dudley, 1st Earl of Leicester, which had no basis in fact, albeit that Leicester had been considered by Elizabeth to be a possible husband for Mary. At the time of the events portrayed, Dudley was actually 55, Elizabeth was 53 and Mary was 44.

However, the libretto does retain the fictional meeting between Mary and Elizabeth in a very dramatic confrontation. While its musical elements are noted below, "the confrontation....so essential to the dramatic structure of both play and opera, it is, surely, a translation into action of a clash which was implicit in history – of a clash which took place in the letters the queens exchanged".

=== Maria Stuarda becomes Buondelmonte ===
An incident occurred at a rehearsal of the opera which is recounted by Harold Rosenthal:

Ronzi De Begnis was to sing Queen Elizabeth (soprano) and Anna Del Serre the mezzo-soprano title-role. At one of the rehearsals an incident occurred [which Donizetti expert, William Ashbrook describes as 'one of the famous scandals of the day']. In the second act of the opera, Mary Stuart rounds on Queen Elizabeth with these words:
Figlia impura di Bolena, / parli tu di disonore? / Meretrice indegna e oscena, / in te cada il mio rossore. / Profanato è il soglio inglese, / vil bastarda, dal tuo piè!
[Translated as: "Impure daughter of Boleyn, do you speak of dishonour? Prostitute — unworthy and obscene, I blush for you. The throne of England is sullied by your feet, vile bastard!"]
At the rehearsal, Anna Del Serre declaimed these lines with such passion, that Ronzi Di Begnis took them as a personal insult and rushed at Del Serre, pulling her hair, punching her, biting her and hitting her on her face and breast. Del Serre returned in kind, but the soprano got the better of her rival, and Del Serre was carried fainting from the theatre.

The rehearsal continued, she sang, the matter went no further. After its successful dress rehearsal, the King of Naples suddenly banned performances of the opera "perhaps because his Queen, Maria Christina, was a direct descendant of Mary Stuart" or "the sight of one queen calling another 'vile bastard' on the stage of the Teatro San Carlo […] was too much for the Neapolitan sensibility". But it has also been simply noted by Professor Weatherson that "politics were the cause" in that reputed secret seditious behavior against Elizabeth I by Mary "made the decapitated monarch unpopular in Bourbon Naples".

Donizetti responded to the ban by suggesting another subject, that being Giovanna Gray ("Lady Jane Gray"), but after it was also rejected, he set about revising and removing large segments of the score and, by quickly employing Pietro Salatino as new librettist, created a different work. He named it Buondelmonte referring to a character who appears in Dante's Paradiso "who apparently caused a war between the Guelphs and the Ghibellines". But prior to its first performance, the composer expressed his concerns in a letter to librettist Jacopo Ferretti (as quoted by Ashbrook):

There used to be six characters in all? Now there are 10 or more. You can imagine what the opera has become! The same scenery, appropriate or not, will be used. I haven't been able to bring myself to ask whether it works or not…

Inevitably perhaps, when Buondelmonte was first given on 18 October 1834 in Naples, it was not successful; it received only six performances and it was never performed again.

When forced to simplify part of the music for the original Elisabetta, Donizetti scribbled on the margin "But it's ugly!", and further on refused a change, writing "Do it, and may you live for a hundred years!"

== Performance history ==
=== Maria Stuarda appears in Italy: its 19th–century rise and fall ===
Although there was an attempt to mount Maria Stuarda at La Scala in late 1834, it came to nothing and, finally, the opera was planned to be given on 28 December 1835 at La Scala, Milan with the famous mezzo-soprano Maria Malibran (a singer who often sang soprano parts) in the title role. Donizetti "tailored that role" for her with "improved recitatives, and extended scenes". In addition, he created a new overture. The censor had approved the libretto, although Ashbrook speculates that some of the original wording had been changed to gain that approval.

In the end, the opening night performance was postponed due to Malibran's indisposition, but when it did occur on 30 December, it was clear that both lead role singers were in poor voice. Donizetti described the evening as "painful, from start to finish". It was quickly clear that the audience disapproved, as did the authorities for different reasons because, instead of singing donna vile as the substitute language for vil bastarda ("vile bastard"), Malibran rejected the censor's revisions and sang the original words. Several better-performed presentations later, the Milan censors clamped down, imposed conditions which Malibran would not accept, and she withdrew. Realizing the difficulties of a run in Italy, a London première was planned, but Malibran's death at the age of 28 in 1836 cancelled the project.

Except for the several performances of the Buondelmonte version noted above, productions of Maria Stuarda were staged in Reggio Emilia and Modena (1837), in Ferrara and Malta (1839–40), in Florence, Ancona, Venice and Madrid (1840), Bologna (1841), Porto (1842), Granada, Málaga, and Barcelona plus Venice and Padua (1843), Lisbon (1844), and finally Pesaro (1844–45), all variously trimmed versions. Naples finally heard the opera in 1865, but the work was ignored for the next 130 years. It has been suggested that, with the exception of Venice and Naples, most of these locations "were of peripheral importance" and therefore the opera "never found its way to the stages of Vienna, Paris, or London", the Italian reception being a major requirement to launch an international success.

=== Revivals in the 20th century and beyond ===
Prior to the discovery of the original autograph in Sweden in the 1980s, the only performances which began the 20th century revival were those of what Ashbrook described as 19th Century "sanitized" versions. The first one of the century was that given in 1958 in Bergamo. The United States premiere was given on 16 November 1964 at Philharmonic Hall, New York in a semi-staged production by the Concert Opera Association that was directed by Edwin Levy. It featured the Little Orchestra Society led by Thomas Scherman. Irene Jordan sang the title role with Grace Hoffman as Elisabetta, Josef Traxel as Roberto, and William Metcalf as Cecil. The premiere in England took place on 1 March 1966 in London. There was also a Maggio Musicale Fiorentino production in 1967 which starred Leyla Gencer and Shirley Verrett.

By the late 1980s, after a critical edition was prepared from the autograph, what was revealed at that point was that Donizetti had re-used a couple of numbers in La favorite, and that in post-Favorite performances, starting with one in Naples in 1865, they had been replaced by different numbers from his other lesser-known operas. The critical edition was first given in Bergamo in 1989 in a two-act version.

The first staged performance in the US took place at the San Francisco Opera on 12 November 1971 with Joan Sutherland in the title role, while the first staged performances of the "Three Queens" operas together in the US took place in 1972 at the New York City Opera, all three operas staged by Tito Capobianco. Presentations of the trio earned some degree of fame for American soprano Beverly Sills who took the starring role in each. Dame Janet Baker sang the title role (in English translation) in a production at English National Opera conducted by Sir Charles Mackerras beginning in 1973, which was recorded and filmed.

The opera has been given in a variety of European and North American locations in recent times, which begin to increasingly establish it as part of the standard repertoire. A production which was noted as "no longer a display piece for rival divas, nor does it maintain the simplistic view that the opera presents Mary as noble victim and Elizabeth as vengeful monster [but] here, the rival queens are both profoundly tragic, complex figures", was given by English Touring Opera in 2005 and Maria Stuarda was presented at both the Teater Vanemuine in Estonia and Pacific Opera in Victoria, B.C. during the 2011/12 season. Between 1 January 2011 and 31 December 2013, the opera has seen 86 performances of 18 productions in 16 cities, according to Operabase.

Other US companies have presented some or all of the "Three Donizetti Queens" operas. Among them has been the Dallas Opera with both Anna Bolena and Maria Stuarda to date. The Minnesota Opera staged all three between 2009 and 2012. In April 2012, the Houston Grand Opera presented the Minnesota Opera's production of the work, but casting mezzo-soprano Joyce DiDonato in the title role. (A mezzo singing the role is not uncommon today, as has been noted below.) She had sung the role of Elisabetta in Geneva in 2005 and, when the Metropolitan Opera gave Maria Stuarda in January/February 2013, it also starred DiDonato as Maria. As with Anna Bolena, which preceded it in 2011, this was the company's first staging of the work.

Welsh National Opera presented all three of Donizetti's "Queens" operas throughout the UK from September to November 2013. This historic season was premiered in Cardiff then toured to venues in England and Wales in 2013.

== Roles ==
Role	Voice type	Premiere cast, 30 December 1835 (Conductor: Eugenio Cavallini)
Maria Stuarda, Queen of Scotland	soprano	Maria Malibran
Elisabetta, Queen of England	soprano or mezzo-soprano	Giacinta Puzzi Toso
Anna Kennedy, Maria's companion	mezzo-soprano	Teresa Moja
Roberto, Earl of Leicester	tenor	Domenico Reina
Lord Guglielmo Cecil, Chancellor of the Exchequer	baritone	Pietro Novelli
Giorgio Talbot, Earl of Shrewsbury	bass	Ignazio Marini
A herald	tenor	

=== The casting of Maria and Elisabetta ===
Originally the roles of Maria and Elisabetta were written for sopranos. However, given the precedent of Malibran singing the role of Maria, many modern-day productions, dating from the late 1950s onwards, cast a mezzo-soprano as either Maria or Elisabetta. The role of Maria was written for Giuseppina Ronzi de Begnis, who sang the soprano roles of Donna Anna, in Don Giovanni, and Norma but also the mezzo-soprano role of Rosina, in The Barber of Seville.

After the King of Naples banned the opera when it was in rehearsal, it became Buondelmonte with one or other of the queens (probably Elisabetta) turned into the tenor title-role and de Begnis singing a role called Bianca. Malibran (who sang Norma but also Leonore and Cenerentola and had a range of G3-E6) then decided that she wanted to sing Maria Stuarda, which she did until it was banned again. It was performed for a time subsequently in "sanitised" form and was eventually revived in 1958, still sanitised.

== Music ==
As musicologist and Donizetti expert William Ashbrook notes, in many respects the musical structure of the opera is fairly straightforward and follows many of the conventions of the day. For example, Elisabeth, Mary, and Leicester "are each given a "double-aria" (a cantabile followed by a cabaletta) at their first appearances and Mary is also given one at the opera's end. However, the composer's strength lies in being able to tailor the framework to "a specific set of dramatic circumstances". Singled out is Maria's Oh nube! che lieve per l'aria t'aggiri ("Oh cloud, that wanders light upon the breeze") which appears in her entrance scene.

Therefore, adapting to many of the conventions of 19th Century Italian opera, which had become the tradition before he began composing, Donizetti's work increasingly shows a shift to more dramatically complex musical forms, the aim of which is to enhance the often-dramatic confrontations between the characters in his operas. Ashbrook notes two of these conventions: the tradition of the soprano's aria di sortita (given upon her first appearance onstage) and the typical, often florid, aria which becomes the opera's finale. Therefore, in the case of the soprano's entrance aria, Ashbrook observes:

As if to counteract [these dramatic limitations], through much of his composing life Donizetti worked to expand the expressive potential of duets. The broad spectrum of dramatic situations possible for duets appealed to his strong theatrical sense, and they came to occupy an increasingly important place in his designs. It is consistent with the rising tide of Romanticism in Italian opera during the 1830s and the growing emphasis on melodramatic elements that new prominence should be placed upon duets, especially those of confrontation.

Examples occur in Anna Bolena and Maria Padilla, both of which precede this opera, but Ashbrook recognized at least two instances which evidence Donizetti's distinctive musical genius in Maria Stuarda. One is the Leicester-Elizabeth duet (beginning with Leicester's Era d'amor l'immagine / "She was the picture of love") which appears before Maria's entrance and where Leicester pleads for Maria while Elizabeth's "ironic interjections provide a contrast of rhythmic emphasis and melodic pattern to the tenor's balanced lyric phrases".

Most significantly, the other is in the great dramatic scene (unusually long and elaborate tempo di mezzo, between the pezzo concertato and the stretta) at the end of act 1 (act 2 in some productions) – the confrontation between the two queens – which gives "the climactic moment something of the immediacy of the spoken theatre. In any sense, this dialogue is one of the most original and powerful passages that Donizetti ever composed" or, as another critic puts it, "so that the outrageous text is heard in shocking relief."

In regard to the music of the ending of act 2, in the dramatic action it has been noted as fitting to the "sparse, clearly-constructed action leading to an inescapable end. And since that end is the focus of all interest, it is not surprising that the final act is musically as well as dramatically the culmination of the work, growing out of but eclipsing all that has gone before".

With the delay between the cancelled performances in Naples and the premiere of Maria Stuarda in Milan almost a year and a half later, Donizetti was to replace the prelude with a full overture and added a new version of a duet between Elizabeth and Leicester using previously written music.

== Synopsis ==
Place: Palace of Westminster, London and Fotheringhay Castle, Northamptonshire, England.
Time: The year 1587.

=== Act 1 ===
Scene 1: Elisabetta's court at Westminster

The Lords and Ladies of the Court enter after a tournament to honor the French ambassador, who has brought a marriage proposal to Queen Elizabeth from the Dauphin François. They express their joy as Elizabeth enters. She considers the proposal, one which would create an alliance with France, but she is reluctant to give up her freedom and also pardon her cousin Mary Stuart, the former Queen of Scots, whom she has imprisoned because of various plots against her throne (Cavatina: Ahi! quando all'ara scórgemi / "Ah! when at the altar a chaste love from heaven singles me out"). Elizabeth expresses her uncertainty while at the same time, Talbot and the courtiers plead for Mary's life (Cabaletta: Ah! dal Ciel discenda un raggio / "Ah! may some ray descend from heaven").

Just as Elizabeth inquires where Leicester is, he enters and Elizabeth tells him to inform the French ambassador that she will indeed marry François. He betrays no signs of being jealous, and the Queen assumes that she has a rival.

Alone with Leicester, Talbot reveals to him that he has just returned from Fotheringay and gives a letter and a miniature portrait of Mary. Joyously, Leicester recalls his love for Mary (Aria of Leicester, then duet with Talbot: Ah! rimiro il bel sembiante / "Ah! Again I see her beautiful face"). Talbot asks what he intends to do and Leicester swears to try to free her from her imprisonment (Vuò liberarla! Vuò liberarla! / "I want to set her free").

Talbot leaves and, as Leicester is about to do so, Elizabeth enters. Clearly knowing what has gone on between the two men, she questions him, asks about a letter from Mary, and then demands to see it. Reluctantly, Leicester hands it over, noting that Mary has asked for a meeting with her cousin and he pleads with the Queen to agree to do so. Also, upon her questioning, he confesses his love for Mary (Duet of Leicester and Elizabeth: Era d'amor l'immagine / "She was the picture of love"). Told that Elizabeth can join a hunting party on the estates where Mary is imprisoned, she agrees to the meeting, albeit with revenge on her mind (Cabaletta to the duet: Sul crin la rivale la man mi stendea / "Over my head my rival stretched out her hand").

Scene 2: Fotheringay Castle

[In many modern performances this scene is called Act 2, with the final act becoming Act 3. Donizetti scholar William Ashbrook in Grove Dictionary notes that the opera is "in two or three acts".]

Mary reflects on her youth in France with her companion, Anna (Cavatina: Oh nube! che lieve per l'aria ti aggiri / "Oh cloud! that wanders light upon the breeze"). The sounds of a royal hunt are heard and, hearing the hunters cry out that the Queen is close by, Mary expresses her disgust (Cabaletta: Nella pace del mesto reposo / "In the peace of my sad seclusion, she would afflict me with a new terror"). To her surprise, Leicester approaches and warns Mary of Elizabeth's imminent arrival, counseling her to behave humbly towards the Queen, who is then despondent (Duet: Da tutti abbandonata / "Forsaken by everyone… my heart knows no hope"). But assuring Mary that he will do whatever is necessary to obtain her freedom, Leicester leaves her to meet Elizabeth. He then attempts to plead with the Queen for her forbearance.

When Mary is brought in by Talbot, Elizabeth reacts with hostility (È sempre la stessa: superba, orgogliosa / She is always the same, proud, overbearing") and, after each character collectively expresses his or her feelings, Mary approaches and kneels before the Queen (Aria: Morta al mondo, ah! morta al trono / "Dead to the world, and dead to the throne… I come to beg your pardon"). The confrontation soon becomes hostile. Elizabeth accuses Mary of having murdered her husband, Lord Darnley, as well as acts of treason and debauchery, all the while Leicester attempting to calm both sides. Stung by Elizabeth's false accusations, Mary calls her the Figlia impura di Bolena ("Impure daughter of Boleyn") and continues with the final insult: Profanato è il soglio inglese, vil bastarda, dal tuo piè! ("The English throne is sullied, vile bastard, by your foot"). Elizabeth is horrified and demands that the guards take Mary away, declaring "The axe that awaits you will show my revenge". Mary is returned to captivity.

=== Act 2 ===
Scene 1: A room in Elisabetta's apartments

Cecil enters with the death warrant and attempts to persuade her to sign it. While she hesitates, Elizabeth contemplates the situation (Trio: Quella vita a me funesta / "That life, so threatening to me"). Cecil urges her to sign it "so that every ruler will know how to pardon you for it" and, as she is about to do so, Leicester arrives. Seeing him, Elizabeth exclaims "you are hastening the execution" and signs the death warrant. Leicester pleads for mercy, Elizabeth rejects the plea, and Cecil urges her to remain firm (Trio Deh! per pietà sospendi l'estremo colpo almeno / "Alas! For pity's sake spare the final blow at least"). The confrontation ends with Elizabeth holding firm despite Leicester's accusations of cruelty; she orders him to witness Mary's execution.

Scene 2: Maria's room

Mary contemplates her fate, and that of Leicester also: "I have brought misfortune to all". Talbot and Cecil enter and Cecil tells Mary that he holds her death warrant. After Cecil leaves the room, Talbot informs her that Leicester has been ordered to witness her execution. Beside herself with grief, Mary imagines that the ghost of Lord Darnley is in the room with her, while Talbot offers comfort (Duet: Quando di luce rosea il giorno a me splendea / "While with the light of dawn my life still sparkled"). However, Talbot then presses her about "one more sin": her "unity with" ("uniti eri") Babington, to which she initially responds "Ah! be silent; it was a fatal error", but, when he insists, adds that "dying my heart affirms it."

Scene 3: The courtyard at Fotheringay

People gather at the site of the execution, lamenting that a queen's death will bring shame upon England. Mary enters and says her farewells to the crowd, which includes Talbot, telling them she will be going to a better life. She calls them to a final prayer (Mary, with Chorus: Deh! Tu di un úmile preghiera il suono odi / "Ah! May Thou hear the sound of our humble prayer") and, together, she and the crowd pray for God's mercy. When Cecil arrives to tell her that the time for her execution has come, he informs her that Elizabeth has granted her final wishes, including allowing Anna to accompany her to the scaffold. Then Mary offers a pardon to the queen (Mary, Anna, Talbot, Cecil, chorus: Di un cor che more reca il perdóno / "From a heart that is dying, may pardon be granted"). Leicester comes to bid her farewell. Both are distraught and he expresses outrage. Mary asks him to support her at the hour of her death and protests her innocence once again (Aria: Ah! se un giorno da queste ritorte / "Ah! Though one day from this prison your arm wanted to abduct me, now you lead me to my death"). She is then led to the scaffold.

== Recordings ==
Year	Cast (Maria, Elisabeta, Leicester, Talbot, Cecil)	Conductor, Opera House and Orchestra	Label
1967	Leyla Gencer, Shirley Verrett, Franco Tagliavini, Agostino Ferrin, Giulio Fioravanti	Francesco Molinari Pradelli, Maggio Musicale Fiorentino Orchestra e Chorus	CD: Hunt Productions; Cat: HUNTCD 543-2 (Live performance of 2 May 1967)
1971	Beverly Sills, Eileen Farrell, Stuart Burrows, Louis Quilico, Christian du Plessis	Aldo Ceccato, London Philharmonic Orchestra with John Alldis Choir	CD: Deutsche Grammophon; Cat: 289 465961-2 (Part of "3 Queens" box set)
1974/75	Joan Sutherland, Huguette Tourangeau, Luciano Pavarotti, Roger Soyer, James Morris	Richard Bonynge, Teatro Comunale di Bologna Orchestra and Chorus	CD: Decca; Cat:00289 425 4102
1982	Dame Janet Baker, Rosalind Plowright, David Rendall, John Tomlinson, Alan Opie,	Charles Mackerras, English National Opera Orchestra and Chorus	CD: Chandos; Cat: CHAN 3017(2)
1989	Edita Gruberová, Agnes Baltsa, Francisco Araiza, Simone Alaimo, Francesco Ellero d'Artegna	Giuseppe Patanè, Münchner Rundfunkorchester	CD: Phillips; Cat: 426233-2
2001	Carmela Remigio, Sonia Ganassi, Joseph Calleja, Riccardo Zanellato, Marzio Giossi	Fabrizio M. Carminati, Orchestra Stabile di Bergamo "G.Donizetti"	DVD: Dynamic; Cat:33407
2007	Maria Pia Piscitelli, Laura Polverelli, Roberto De Biasio, Simone Alberghini, Mario Cassi	Riccardo Frizza, Orchestra Filarmonica Marchigiana	DVD: Naxos; Cat: 2.110268
2008	Mariella Devia, Anna Caterina Antonacci, Francesco Meli, Simone Alberghini, Piero Terranova	Antonino Fogliani, Teatro alla Scala orchestra and chorus	DVD: ArtHaus Musik; Cat: 101 361; CD: Premiere Opera Ltd, Cat: CDNO 2836-2
2015	Joyce DiDonato, Elza van den Heever, Matthew Polenzani, Matthew Rose, Joshua Hopkins	Maurizio Benini, Metropolitan Opera orchestra and chorus	DVD: Erato Records; Cat:2564605475
2020	Diana Damrau, Salome Jici, Paolo Fanale, Nicolas Testé, André Courville	Enrique Mazzola, Zurich Opera orchestra and chorus	Opernhaus Zurich, Streaming on various platforms
