= Cristina Trivulzio Belgiojoso =

Italian noblewoman and princess of Belgiojoso

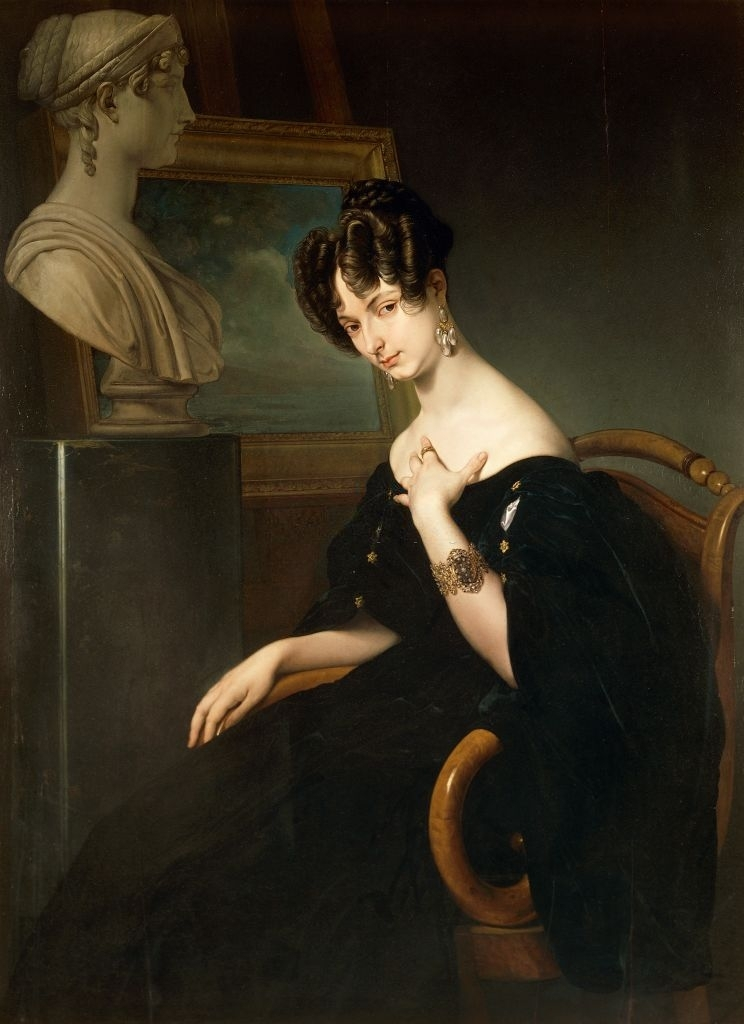
Portrait of Cristina Trivulzio Belgiojoso by Francesco Hayez, 1831

Cristina Trivulzio di Belgiojoso (Italian pronunciation: [kriˈstiːna triˈvultsjo di beldʒoˈjoːzo, -oːso]; 28 June 1808, Milan, Lombardy, Italy – 5 July 1871, near Milan) was an Italian noblewoman, the princess of Belgiojoso, who played a prominent part in Italy's struggle for independence. She is also notable as a writer and journalist.

== Life ==
Cristina Trivulzio was the daughter of Girolamo Trivulzio and the Vittoria dei Marchesi Gherardini (member of the Gherardini family). Her father died soon after her birth, and her mother remarried to Alessandro Visconti d'Aragona; she had a stepbrother and three stepsisters through this second marriage. By her own account "I was as a child melancholy, serious, introverted, quiet, so shy that I often happen to burst into tears in the living room of my mother because I realized that I was being looked at or that they wanted me to talk." When she was thirteen, her stepfather was arrested since he was allegedly involved in the riots of 1820–21, while Ernesta Bisi, her drawing teacher, was close to the Carboneria secret society.

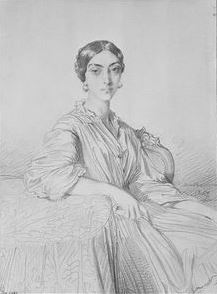
Portrait of princess Christine de Belgiojoso by Théodore Chassériau (Petit Palais, musée des Beaux-arts de la Ville de Paris)

She married at 16, at the Church of St. Fedele in Milan on 24 September 1824. She was considered the richest heiress in Italy, with a dowry of 400,000 francs. Her libertine husband, Prince Emilio Barbiano di Belgiojoso, caused a separation soon after. They did not divorce and remained on cordial terms throughout their lives.

She had begun associating with Mazzinian revolutionaries through her art teacher Ernesta Bisi and stepfather Marquis Alessandro Visconti d'Aragona. This brought her to the attention of the Austrian authorities, and she fled penniless to France. Her husband sent her money, and she bought an apartment close to the Madeleine, although she lived in relative poverty.

Eventually more money was sent, and she moved house and set up a salon. During the 1830s and 1840s her Paris salon became a meeting place for Italian revolutionaries such as Vincenzo Gioberti, Niccolò Tommaseo, and Camillo Cavour. She also associated with the European artistic intelligentsia, including Hector Berlioz, Alexis de Tocqueville, Honoré de Balzac, Frederic Chopin, Alfred de Musset, Victor Hugo, Heinrich Heine, Franz Liszt, and played an important influence in the initial singing career of "Mario the tenor" Giovanni M. de Candia. Other acquaintances were the historians Augustin Thierry and Francois Mignet who would play a major role in her life. It was at her salon that she hosted the famous March 31, 1837 duel between Liszt and Sigismond Thalberg to determine who was the greater pianist. Belgiojoso's judgment was, "Thalberg is the greatest pianist, but there is only one Liszt."

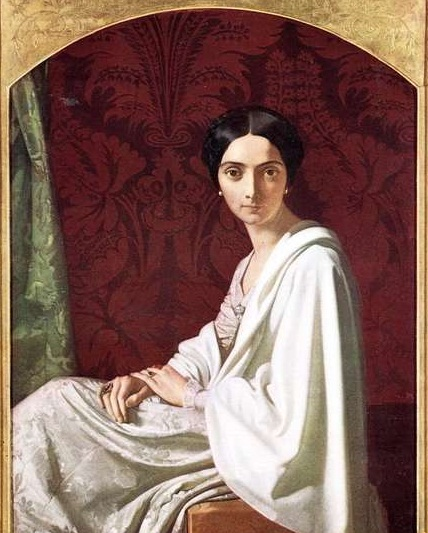
Princess of Belgiojoso, Cristina Trivulzio Belgiojoso, in 1843 by painter Henri Lehmann

In 1838, she had a daughter, Mary. The natural father was certainly not her estranged husband; it has been speculated that he may have been her friend Francois Mignet or her personal secretary Bolognini.

She visited Ireland in 1839. Old Business Records of Leahy's Inn Abbeyfeale, Co. Limerick record that she hired 4 horses – Mouse, Jack, Poll & Nancy – and 2 drivers – Brown & Farrell – for her onward journey by Carriage on 2nd Oct 1839. These are the only known surviving records of her stay in Ireland. A plaque on the site of the inn's location commemorates her visit.

In the 1848 Italian revolutions, she organized and financed a troop of soldiers and fought in the Milanese uprising against the Austrians for Italy's independence. After the insurrection failed, she returned to Paris and published articles in the influential magazine Revue des Deux Mondes describing the struggle in Italy.

In 1849, she returned to Italy to support the Roman Republic formed in the Papal States by Mazzini and others. She became a hospital director during the brief life of the republic until it was suppressed by French troops.

Cristina fled, accompanied by her daughter, first to Malta and then to Constantinople, from where she published an account of the republic and its fall in the French magazine Le National in 1850. She bought land in the remote Çakmakoğlu area and then traveled to Syria, Lebanon and Palestine. Cristina published accounts of her experiences in the orient and found the condition of women there particularly disturbing. She published Of Women's Condition and of their Future (1866) in which she argues that deprived of education, women come to accept the oppressive conditions in which they find themselves.

She lived in exile in Turkey for eight years before returning to Italy in 1856 and working with the statesman Camillo Benso Cavour for Italian unification, which was achieved in 1861.

In 1858 her estranged husband, Emilio—still legally her spouse—died. A few years later, she was finally able to legitimize her daughter, Mary.

Her final years were spent in retirement between Milan and Lake Como in the company of her daughter and son-in-law, Marquis Ludovico, her English governess Miss Parker, and her Turkish servant, a freed slave. During this period, she continued to write and publish until her death at age 63.

== Works ==
- Essai sur la formation du dogme catholique, 1842 (Essay on the Formation of Catholic Dogma)
- L'Italie et la révolution italienne de 1848, 1849 (Italy and the Italian Revolution of 1848)
- Souvenirs dans l'exil, 1850 (Memories in Exile)
- Récits turques, 1856 to 1858 (Turkish Short Stories)
- Asie Mineure et Syrie, 1858 (Asia Minor and Syria)
- Scènes de la vie turque, 1858 (Scenes from Turkish life)
- Della condizione delle donne e del loro avvenire, 1866 (Of Women's Condition and of their Future)
- Osservazioni sullo stato dell'Italia e del suo avvenire, 1868 (Observations on Italy and Its Future)
- Sulla moderna politica internazionale, 1869 (About Modern International Politics)
