= List of operas performed at the Wexford Festival =

List of the operas performed by Wexford Festival Opera since its inception in 1951

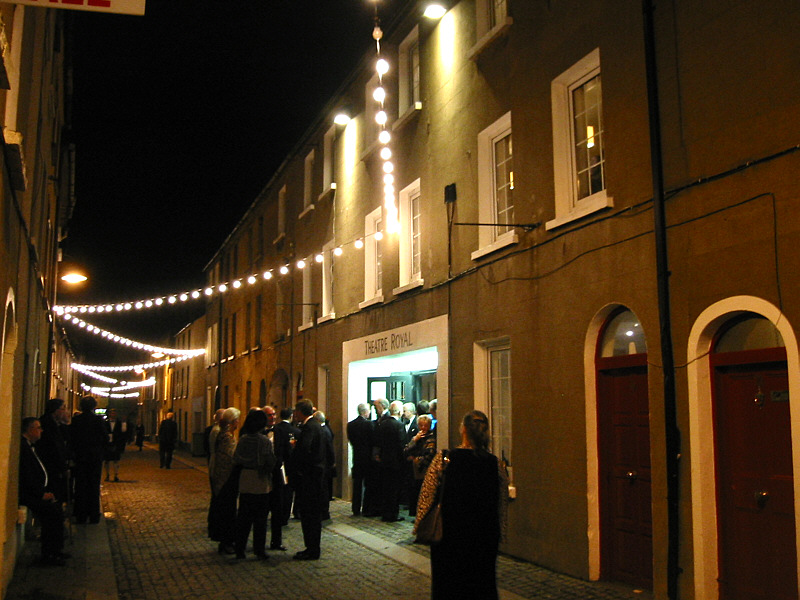
The Theatre Royal during the Wexford Opera Festival

Below is a complete list of the operas performed by Wexford Festival Opera since its inception in 1951 (75 years ago). Only complete operas presented on stage with orchestra are listed; over the years, the Festival has also presented programmes of scenes from operas and one-act operas with piano accompaniment.

Nearly all the performances listed took place at the Theatre Royal, Wexford or (from 2008) at the new Wexford Opera House. After the demolition of the Theatre Royal and during the building of the Opera House, the 2006 season operas were performed at the Dún Mhuire Theatre in Wexford, and the 2007 operas at Johnstown Castle, a few kilometres outside the town.

The Festival has been led by the following Artistic Directors:

- 1951–66: Tom Walsh
- 1967–73: Brian Dickie
- 1974–78: Thomson Smillie
- 1979–81: Adrian Slack
- 1982–94: Elaine Padmore
- 1995–2004: Luigi Ferrari
- 2005–2019: David Agler
- 2020–present: Rosetta Cucchi

== List ==
Year	Opera	Composer	Language	Premiere of opera	Conductor	Director	Designer	Singers
1951	The Rose of Castille	Balfe	English	1857	Dermot O'Hara	Powell Lloyd		Murray Dickie
1952	L'elisir d'amore	Donizetti	Italian	1832	Dermot O'Hara	Peter Ebert	Joseph Carl	Nicola Monti
1953	Don Pasquale	Donizetti	Italian	1843	Bryan Balkwill	Peter Ebert	Joseph Carl	Afro Poli, Nicola Monti
1954	La sonnambula	Bellini	Italian	1831	Bryan Balkwill	Peter Ebert	Joseph Carl	Marilyn Cotlow, Nicola Monti
1955	Der Wildschütz	Lortzing	German	1842	Hans Gierster	Anthony Besch	Peter Rice	Heather Harper, Thomas Hemsley
1955	Manon Lescaut	Puccini	Italian	1893	Bryan Balkwill	Anthony Besch	Peter Rice	
1956	La cenerentola	Rossini	Italian	1817	Bryan Balkwill	Peter Ebert	Joseph Carl	Barbara Howitt, April Cantelo, Patricia Kern, Nicola Monti
1956	Martha	Flotow	German	1847	Bryan Balkwill	Peter Potter	Joseph Carl	Josef Traxel, Constance Shacklock
1957	La figlia del reggimento	Donizetti	French	1840	Bryan Balkwill	Peter Ebert	Joseph Carl	Graziella Sciutti, Geraint Evans, Patricia Kern
1957	L'Italiana in Algeri	Rossini	Italian	1813	Bryan Balkwill	Peter Ebert	Joseph Carl	Barbara Howitt, Paolo Montarsolo, April Cantelo, Patricia Kern
1958	Anna Bolena	Donizetti	Italian	1830	Charles Mackerras	Peter Potter	Michael Eve	Fiorenza Cossotto, Patricia Kern
1958	I due Foscari	Verdi	Italian	1844	Bryan Balkwill	Peter Ebert	Reginald Woolley	Mariella Angioletti
1959	La gazza ladra	Rossini	Italian	1817	John Pritchard	Peter Potter	Osbert Lancaster	Janet Baker, Mariella Adani, Elizabeth Bainbridge, Nicola Monti
1959	Aroldo	Verdi	Italian	1857	Charles Mackerras	Frans Boerlage	Micheál Mac Liammhóir	Aldo Protti, Elizabeth Bainbridge
1960	No Festival – theatre closed for reconstruction							
1961	Ernani	Verdi	Italian	1844	Bryan Balkwill	Peter Ebert	Reginald Woolley	Maria Angioletti, Ragnar Ulfung, Lino Puglisi
1961	Mireille	Gounod	French	1864	Michael Moores	Anthony Besch	Osbert Lancaster	Andréa Guiot, Alain Vanzo, Jean Borthayre, Laura Sarti
1962	L'amico Fritz	Mascagni	Italian	1891	Antonio Tonini	Michael Hadjimischev	Reginald Woolley	Bernadette Greevy, Nicola Monti
1962	I puritani	Bellini	Italian	1835	Gunnar Staern	Peter Ebert	Reginald Woolley	Mirella Freni
1963	Don Pasquale	Donizetti	Italian	1843	Antonio de Almeida	Michael Hadjimischev	Anna Hadjimischev	Margherita Rinaldi
1963	La Gioconda	Ponchielli	Italian	1876	Gunnar Staern	Peter Ebert	Reginald Woolley	Enriqueta Tarres, Anna Reynolds, Giuseppe Gismondo
1963	The Siege of Rochelle	Balfe	English	1835	(piano duo accompaniment)	Douglas Craig	Reginald Wooley	Patricia McCarry, Franco Ventriglia, Anna Reynolds
1964	Lucia di Lammermoor	Donizetti	Italian	1835	Antonio de Almeida	Michel Crochot	Reginald Woolley	Giacomo Aragall
1964	Il conte Ory	Rossini	French	1828	Gunnar Staern	Peter Ebert	Reginald Woolley	Alberta Valentini, Pietro Bottazzo
1964	Much Ado About Nothing	Stanford	English	1901	Courtney Kenny	Peter Ebert	Reginald Woolley	Soo Bee Lee
1965	Don Quichotte	Massenet	French	1910	Albert Rosen	Carl Ebert	Reginald Woolley	Miroslav Čangalović, Ivana Mixová
1965	La traviata	Verdi	Italian	1853	Gunnar Staern	Peter Ebert	Reginald Woolley	Philip Langridge
1965	La finta giardiniera	Mozart	Italian	1775	Gunnar Staern	Peter Ebert	Judith Ebert	Mattiwilda Dobbs, Birgit Nordin, Ugo Benelli
1966	Fra Diavolo	Auber	French	1830	Myer Fredman	Dennis Maunder	Reginald Woolley	Alberta Valentini, Anna Reynolds, Ugo Benelli, Nigel Douglas
1966	Lucrezia Borgia	Donizetti	Italian	1833	Albert Rosen	Frith Banbury	Reginald Woolley	Virginia Gordoni
1967	Otello	Rossini	Italian	1816	Albert Rosen	Anthony Besch	John Stoddart	
1967	Roméo et Juliette	Gounod	French	1867	David Lloyd-Jones	John Cox	Patrick Murray	Richard Van Allan, Anne Pashley, Pamela Bowden, Henri Gui
1968	La clemenza di Tito	Mozart	Italian	1791	Theodore Gushlbauer	John Copley	Michael Waller	
1968	La jolie fille de Perth	Bizet	French	1867	David Lloyd-Jones	Pauline Grant	Robin Archer	Roger Soyer, Henri Gui, John Wakefield, Isabel Garcisanz
1968	L'equivoco stravagante	Rossini	Italian	1811	Aldo Ceccato	John Cox	John Stoddart	Richard Van Allan
1969	L'infedeltà delusa	Haydn	Italian	1773	David Lloyd-Jones	John Copley	John Fraser	Eugenia Ratti, Jill Gomez, Ugo Benelli, Alexander Young
1969	Luisa Miller	Verdi	Italian	1849	Myer Fredman	John Cox	Bernard Culshaw	Bernadette Greevy
1970	Albert Herring	Britten	English	1947	David Atherton	Michael Geliot	Jane Bond	Alan Opie, Enid Hartle
1970	Lakmé	Delibes	French	1833	David Lloyd-Jones	Michael Hadjimischev	John Fraser	Christiane Eda-Pierre, Jacques Mars
1970	L'inganno felice	Rossini	Italian	1812	David Atherton	Patrick Libby	John Fraser	Jill Gomez, Ugo Benelli
1970	Il giovedi grasso	Donizetti	Italian	1829	David Atherton	Patrick Libby	John Fraser	Jill Gomez
1971	Les pêcheurs de perles	Bizet	French	1863	Guy Barbier	Michael Geliot	Roger Butlin/ Jane Bond	Christiane Eda-Pierre
1971	La rondine	Puccini	Italian	1917	Myer Fredman	Anthony Besch	John Stoddart	June Card, Alexander Oliver, Thomas Lawlor
1971	Il re pastore	Mozart	Italian	1775	Kenneth Montgomery	John Cox	Elizabeth Dalton	Norma Burrowes, Anne Pashley
1972	Oberon	Weber	English	1826	Kenneth Montgomery	Anthony Besch	Adam Pollock	John Fryatt
1972	Il pirata	Bellini	Italian	1827	Leone Magiera	Michael Geliot	Jane Venables	Christiane Eda-Pierre
1972	Káťa Kabanová	Janáček	Czech	1921	Albert Rosen	David Pountney	Sue Blane/ Maria Björnson	Ivo Žídek
1973	Ivan Susanin	Glinka	Russian	1836	Guy Barbier	Michael Hadjimischev	Sue Blane	Matti Salminen, Dennis O'Neill
1973	The Gambler	Prokofiev	Russian	1929	Albert Rosen	David Pountney	Maria Björnson	Joseph Rouleau, Dennis O'Neill, Richard Stilgoe
1973	L'ajo nell'imbarazzo	Donizetti	Italian	1824	Kenneth Montgomery	Patrick Libby	Adam Pollock	Richard Stilgoe
1974	Medea in Corinto	Mayr	Italian	1813	Roderick Bryden	Adrian Slack	David Fielding	Margreta Elkins
1974	Thaïs	Massenet	French	1894	Jacques Delacôte	Jeremy Sutcliffe	John Fraser	Ann Murray, Jill Gomez
1974	Der Barbier von Bagdad	Cornelius	German	1858	Albert Rosen	Wolf Siegfried Wagner	Dacre Punt/ Alex Reid	
1975	Eritrea	Cavalli	Italian	1652	Jane Glover	Ian Strasfogel	Franco Colavecchia	Paul Esswood, Philip Langridge, Ann Murray
1975	Le roi d'Ys	Lalo	French	1888	Jean Perrison	Jean-Claude Auvray	Bernard Arnould	Gillian Knight
1975	La pietra del paragone	Rossini	Italian	1812	Roderick Bryden	Adrian Slack	John Bury	Eric Garrett
1976	Giovanna d'Arco	Verdi	Italian	1845	James Judd	Jeremy Sutcliffe	David Fielding	
1976	The Merry Wives of Windsor	Nicolai	German	1849	Leonard Hancock	Patrick Libby	Adam Pollock	Michael Langdon, Alan Opie
1976	The Turn of the Screw	Britten	English	1954	Albert Rosen	Adrian Slack	David Fielding	Jane Manning
1977	Hérodiade	Massenet	French	1882	Henri Gallois	Julian Hope	Roger Butlin	Malcolm Donnelly, Bernadette Greevy, Bonaventura Bottone
1977	Orfeo ed Euridice	Gluck	Italian	1762	Jane Glover	Wolf Siegfried Wagner	Dacre Punt/ Alex Reid	Jennifer Smith
1977	Il maestro di cappella	Cimarosa	Italian	1793?	James Judd	Sesto Bruscantini	Tim Reed	Sesto Bruscantini
1977	La serva e l'ussero	L Ricci	Italian	1836	James Judd	Sesto Bruscantini	Tim Reed	Sesto Bruscantini, Bonaventura Bottone
1977	La serva padrona	Pergolesi	Italian	1733	James Judd	Sesto Bruscantini	Tim Reed	Sesto Bruscantini
1978	Tiefland	d'Albert	German	1903	Henri Gallois	Julian Hope	Roger Butlin	Malcolm Donnelly, Mani Mekler, Bonaventura Bottone
1978	Il mondo della luna	Haydn	Italian	1777	James Judd	Adrian Slack	Axel Bartz	Helen Dixon, Elaine Linstedt, Emily Hastings, Dennis O'Neill, Alan Watt, Ugo Benelli, Gianni Socci
1978	The Two Widows	Smetana	Czech	1874	Albert Rosen	David Pountney	Sue Blane	Felicity Palmer, Elizabeth Gale, Robert White, Joseph Rouleau, Bonaventura Bottone, Dinah Harris
1979	L'amore dei tre re	Montemezzi	Italian	1913	Pinchas Steinberg	Stewart Trotter	Douglas Heap	Bonaventura Bottone
1979	La vestale	Spontini	Italian	1807	Matthias Bamert	Julian Hope	Roger Butlin/ Sue Blane	Mani Mekler, Terence Sharpe, Roderick Kennedy
1979	Crispino e la comare	F & L Ricci	Italian	1850	James Judd	Sesto Bruscantini	Tim Reed	Lucia Aliberti, Sesto Bruscantini, Bonaventura Bottone
1980	Edgar	Puccini	Italian	1889	Robin Stapleton	Roger Chapman	Douglas Heap/ Jane Law	
1980	Orlando	Handel	Italian	1733	James Judd	Wilfred Judd	Kandis Cook/ Alison Meacher	Lesley Garrett, Bernadette Greevy
1980	Of Mice and Men	Floyd	English	1970	John DeMain	Stewart Trotter	John Cervenka	
1981	I gioielli della Madonna	Wolf-Ferrari	Italian	1911	Colman Pearce	Graham Vick	Russell Craig	
1981	Zaide	Mozart	German	1780	Nicholas Cleobury	Timothy Tyrrel	Dermot Hayes	Neil Mackie, Lesley Garrett, Ulrik Cold
1981	Un giorno di regno	Verdi	Italian	1840	James Judd	Sesto Bruscantini	Tim Reed	Angela Feeney, Lucia Aliberti, Sesto Bruscantini
1982	Sakùntala	Alfano	Italian	1921	Albert Rosen	Nicholas Hytner	David Fielding	
1982	L'isola disabitata	Haydn	Italian	1779	Newell Jenkins	Guus Mostart	John Otto	Bernadette Greevy
1982	Grisélidis	Massenet	French	1891	Robin Stapleton	Steven Pimlott	Ariane Gastambide	Sergei Leiferkus
1983	Hans Heiling	Marschner	German	1833	Albert Rosen	Steven Pimlott	David Fielding	Sergei Leiferkus
1983	La vedova scaltra	Wolf-Ferrari	Italian	1931	Yan Pascal Tortelier	Charles Hamilton	Tim Reed	Jill Gomez
1983	Linda di Chamounix	Donizetti	Italian	1842	Gabriele Bellini	Julian Hope	Annena Stubbs	Lucia Aliberti
1984	Le jongleur de Notre-Dame	Massenet	French	1902	Yan Pascal Tortelier	Stefan Janski	Johan Engels	Patrick Power, Sergei Leiferkus
1984	Le astuzie femminili	Cimarosa	Italian	1794	György Fischer	Andy Hinds	John McMurray	Susanna Rigacci, Raúl Giménez
1984	The Kiss	Smetana	Czech	1876	Albert Rosen	Toby Robertson	Bernard Culshaw	John Ayldon
1985	Ariodante	Handel	Italian	1735	Alan Curtis	Guus Mostart	John Otto	Raúl Giménez, Bernadette Greevy
1985	Rise and Fall of the City of Mahagonny	Weill	German	1930	Simon Joly	Declan Donnellan	John Ormerod	Sherry Zannoth, Valentin Jar, John Gibbs, Nuala Willis
1985	La Wally	Catalani	Italian	1892	Albert Rosen	Stefan Janski	Marie-Jeanne Lecca	
1986	Königskinder	Humperdinck	German	1897	Albert Rosen	Michael McCaffrey	Di Seymour	William Lewis, Sergei Leiferkus
1986	Tancredi	Rossini	Italian	1813	Arnold Östman	Michael Beauchamp	William Passmore	Bruce Ford
1986	Mignon	Thomas	French	1866	Yan Pascal Tortelier	Richard Jones	Richard Hudson	Beverly Hoch
1987	Cendrillon	Massenet	French	1899	Stéphane Cardon	Seamus McGrenera	Tim Reed	
1987	La cena delle beffe	Giordano	Italian	1924	Albert Rosen	Patrick Mason	Joe Vaněk	Alessandra Marc, Fabio Armiliato, Miriam Gauci, Mikhail Krutikov
1987	La straniera	Bellini	Italian	1829	Jan Latham Koenig	Robert Carsen	Russell Craig	Mikhail Svetlov (Krutikov)
1988	The Devil and Kate	Dvořák	Czech	1899	Albert Rosen	Francesca Zambello	Neil Peter Jampolis	
1988	Don Giovanni Tenorio	Gazzaniga	Italian	1787	Simon Joly	Patrick Mason	Joe Vaněk	Norman Bailey
1988	Turandot	Busoni	Italian	1917	Simon Joly	Patrick Mason	Joe Vaněk	Norman Bailey
1988	Elisa e Claudio	Mercadante	Italian	1821	Marco Guidarini	David Fielding	David Fielding/ Bettina Munzer	
1989	Der Templer und die Jüdin	Marschner	German	1829	Albert Rosen	Francesca Zambello	Bettina Munzer	William Stone, Greer Grimsley
1989	Mitridate, re di Ponto	Mozart	Italian	1770	Marco Guidarini	Lucy Bailey	Peter J Davison	Patricia Rozario
1989	The Duenna	Prokofiev	Russian	1946	František Vajnar	Patrick Mason	Joe Vaněk	Spiro Malas, Thomas Lawlor
1990	Zazà	Leoncavallo	Italian	1900	Bruno Rigacci	Jamie Hayes	Ruari Murchison	Wojciech Drabowicz
1990	The Rising of the Moon	Maw	English	1970	Simon Joly	Ceri Sherlock	Richard Aylwin	Elizabeth Bainbridge, Thomas Lawlor
1990	La dame blanche	Boieldieu	French	1825	Emmanuel Joel	Jean-Claude Auvray	Kenny MacLellan	Gillian Knight
1991	L'assedio di Calais	Donizetti	Italian	1836	Evelino Pidò	Francesca Zambello	Alison Chitty	Frank Kelley
1991	Der Widerspänstigen Zähmung	Goetz	German	1874	Oliver von Dohnányi	John Lloyd-Davies	John Lloyd-Davies	Stefan Margita, Frank Kelley
1991	La rencontre imprévue	Gluck	French	1764	Richard Hickox	Jamie Hayes	Ruari Merchison	Paul Austin Kelly
1992	Il piccolo Marat	Mascagni	Italian	1921	Albert Rosen	Stephen Medcalf	Charles Edwards	
1992	Gli equivoci	Storace	Italian	1786	Mark Shanahan	Giles Havergal	Russell Craig	Korliss Uecker
1992	Der Vampyr	Marschner	German	1827	Guido Johannes Rumstadt	Jean-Claude Auvray	Kenny MacLellan	
1993	Cherevichki	Tchaikovsky	Russian	1885	Alexander Anisimov	Francesca Zambello	Bruno Schwengl	Vladimir Matorin
1993	Il barbiere di Siviglia	Paisiello	Italian	1782	Carla Delfrate	Lucy Bailey	Simon Vincenzi	
1993	Zampa	Hérold	French	1831	Yves Abel	Tim Hopkins	Charles Edwards	Mary Mills
1994	The Demon	Rubinstein	Russian	1875	Alexander Anissimov	Yefim Maizel	Paul Steinberg	
1994	La bohème	Leoncavallo	Italian	1897	Albert Rosen	Reto Nickler	Russell Craig	
1994	Das Liebesverbot	Wagner	German	1836	Yves Abel	Dieter Kaegi	Bruno Schwengel	Gidon Saks
1995	Iris	Mascagni	Italian	1898	Bruno Aprea	Lorenzo Mariani	Maurizio Balò	
1995	Saffo	Pacini	Italian	1840	Maurizio Benini	Beni Montressor	Beni Montressor	
1995	Mayskaya noch'	Rimsky-Korsakov	Russian	1880	Vladimir Jurowski	Stephen Medcalf	Francis O'Connor	Vladimir Matorin
1996	Parisina	Donizetti	Italian	1833	Maurizio Benini	Stefano Vizioli	Ulderico Manani	Alexandrina Pendatchanska
1996	L'étoile du nord	Meyerbeer	French	1854	Vladimir Jurowski	Denis Krief	Denis Krief	Juan Diego Flórez, Elizabeth Futral
1996	Šárka	Fibich	Czech	1897	David Agler	Inga Levant	Charles Edwards / Brigitte Reiffenstuel	
1997	Rusalka	Dargomyzhsky	Russian	1856	Paul Mägi	Dimitri Bertmann	Igor Nezny/ Tatyana Tulubieva	Alessandro Safina
1997	La fiamma	Respighi	Italian	1934	Enrique Mazzola	Franco Ripa di Meana	Edoardo Sanchi	
1997	Elena da Feltre	Mercadante	Italian	1839	Maurizio Benini	Sonja Frisell	Marouan Dib	
1998	Fosca	Gomes	Italian	1873	Alexander Anissimov	Giovanni Agostinucci	Giovanni Agostinucci	Fernando del Valle
1998	Šarlatán	Haas	Czech	1938	Israel Yinon	John Abulafia	Fotini Dimou	
1998	I cavalieri di Ekebù	Zandonai	Italian	1925	Daniele Callegari	Gabriele Vacis	Francesco Calcagnini/ Hilary Lewis	Joseph Calleja
1999	Die Königin von Saba	Goldmark	German	1875	Claude Schnitzler	Patrick Mailler	Massimo Gasparon	
1999	Straszny Dwór	Moniuszko	Polish	1865	David Jones	Michal Znaniecki	Francesco Calcagnini	
1999	Siberia	Giordano	Italian	1903	Daniele Callegari	Fabio Sparvoli	Giorgio Ricchelli/ Alessandra Torelli	
2000	Orleanskaya deva	Tchaikovsky	Russian	1881	Daniele Callegari	Massimo Gasparon	Massimo Gasparon	Ermonela Jaho
2000	Si j'étais roi	Adam	French	1852	David Agler	Renaud Doucet	André Barbe / Huguette Barbe-Blanchard	Joseph Calleja
2000	Conchita	Zandonai	Italian	1911	Marcello Rota	Corrado d'Elia	Fabrizio Palla / Steve Almerighi	
2001	Alessandro Stradella	Flotow	German	1844	Daniele Callegari	Thomas de Mallet Burgess	Julian McGowan	
2001	Jakobín	Dvořák	Czech	1889	Alexandre Voloschuk	Michael McCaffery	Paul Edwards	Markus Werba
2001	Sapho	Massenet	French	1897	Jean-Luc Tingaud	Fabio Sparvoli	Giorgio Ricchelli / Alessandra Torella	Ermonela Jaho
2002	Mirandolina	Martinů	Italian	1959	Riccardo Frizza	Paul Curran	Kevin Knight	
2002	Il giuramento	Mercadante	Italian	1837	Paolo Arrivabeni	Joseph Rochlitz	Lucia Goj / Silvia Aymonino	
2002	Manon Lescaut	Auber	French	1856	Jean-Luc Tingaud	Jean-Phillippe Clarac / Olivier Deloeuil	Greco	Ermonela Jaho
2003	Švanda dudák	Weinberger	Czech	1927	Julian Reynolds	Damiano Michieletto	Robin Rawstorne	
2003	Die drei Pintos	Weber	German	1888	Paolo Arrivabeni	Michal Znaniecki	Kevin Knight	
2003	María del Carmen	Granados	Spanish	1898	Max Bragado-Darman	Sergio Vela	Cristiana Aureggi/ Violeta Rojas	
2004	Prinzessin Brambilla	Braunfels	German	1931	Danieli Belardinelli	Rosetta Cucchi	Maria Rosaria Tartaglia	
2004	La vestale	Mercadante	Italian	1840	Paolo Arrivabeni	Thomas de Mallet Burgess	Jamie Vartan	
2004	Eva	Foerster	Czech	1899	Jaroslav Kyzlink	Paul Curran	Paul Edwards	
2005	Pénélope	Fauré	French	1913	Jean-Luc Tingaud	Renaud Doucet	André Barbe	Paul Carey Jones
2005	Susannah	Floyd	English	1955	Christopher Larkin	John Fulljames	Conor Murphy	Simon O'Neill
2005	Maria di Rohan	Donizetti	Italian	1843	Roberto Polastri	Charles Edwards	Charles Edwards / Brigitte Rieffenstuel	Eglise Gutiérrez, James Westman
2006	Don Gregorio	Donizetti	Italian	1826	Michele Mariotti	Roberto Recchia	Ferdia Murphy	
2006	Transformations	Susa	English	1973	David Agler	Michael Barker-Caven	Joe Vaněk	
2007	Arlecchino	Busoni	German	1917	David Agler	Lucio Dalla	Italo Grassi	
2007	Rusalka	Dvořák	Czech	1901	Dmitri Jurowski	Lee Blakeley	Joe Vaněk	Kateřina Jalovcová; Bryan Hymel
2007	Der Silbersee	Weill	German	1933	Timothy Redmond	Keith Warner	Jason Southgate	Nigel Richards, Simon Gleeson, Anita Dobson, Paul Carey Jones
2008	Tutti in maschera	Pedrotti	Italian	1856	Leonardo Vordoni	Rosetta Cucchi	Federico Bianchi/ Claudia Pernigotti	
2008	Snegurochka	Rimsky-Korsakov	Russian	1882	Dmitri Jurowski	John Fulljames	Dick Bird	Natela Nicoli, Kateřina Jalovcová
2008	The Mines of Sulphur	Bennett	English	1965	Stewart Robertson	Michael Barker-Caven	Joe Vaněk	Krisztina Szabó
2009	Maria Padilla	Donizetti	Italian	1841	David Agler	Marco Gandini	Mauro Tinti	
2009	The Ghosts of Versailles	Corigliano	English	1991	Michael Christie	James Robinson	Allen Moyer / James Schuette	Krisztina Szabó
2009	Une éducation manquée	Chabrier	French	1879	Christopher Franklin	Roberto Recchia	Lorenzo Cutùli / Claudia Pernigotti	
2009	La cambiale di matrimonio	Rossini	Italian	1810	Christopher Franklin	Roberto Recchia	Lorenzo Cutùli / Claudia Pernigotti	
2010	Virginia	Mercadante	Italian	1866	Carlos Izcaray	Kevin Newbury	Allen Moyer	Angela Meade, Bruno Ribiero, Hugh Russell, Ivan Magri, John Matthew Myers, Marcella Walsh, Gianluca Buratto
2010	The Golden Ticket	Ash	English	2010	Timothy Redmond	James Robinson	Bruno Schwengl / Martin Pakledinaz	Frank Kelley, Kiera Duffy, Wayne Tigges, Bradley Smoak, Abigail Nims, Owen Gilhooly, Noah Stewart
2010	Hubička	Smetana	Czech	1876	Jaroslav Kyzlink	Michael Gieleta	James Macnamara / Fabio Toblini	
2011	Maria	Statkowski	Polish	1906	Tomasz Tokarczyk	Michael Gieleta	James Macnamara / Fabio Toblini	Daria Masiero, Rafał Bartminski
2011	Gianni di Parigi	Donizetti	Italian	1839	Giacomo Sagripanti	Federico Grazzini	Tiziano Santi / Valeria Donata Betella	Edgardo Rocha, Zuzana Marková
2011	La cour de Célimène	Thomas	French	1855	Carlos Izcaray	Stephen Barlow	Paul Edwards	Luigi Boccia, Claudia Boyle, John Molloy
2012	L'Arlesiana	Cilea	Italian	1897	David Angus	Rosetta Cucchi	Sarah Bacon / Claudia Pernigotti	Annunziata Vestri, Dimitry Golovnin
2012	Le roi malgré lui	Chabrier	French	1887	Jean-Luc Tingaud	Thaddeus Strassberger	Kevin Knight / Mattie Ulrich	Luigi Boccia, Liam Bonner, Mathias Vidal
2012	A Village Romeo and Juliet	Delius	English	1907	Rory Macdonald	Stephen Medcalf	Jamie Vartan	John Bellemer, Jessica Muirhead
2013	Il cappello di paglia di Firenze	Rota	Italian	1955	Sergio Alapont	Andrea Cigni	Lorenze Cutùli	Fillipo Adami
2013	La Navarraise	Massenet	French	1894	David Agler	Renaud Doucet	André Barbe	Nora Sourouzian, Philippe Do
2013	Thérèse	Massenet	French	1907	David Agler	Renaud Doucet	André Barbe	Nora Sourouzian, Philippe Do, Brian Mulligan
2013	Cristina, regina di Svezia	Foroni	Italian	1849	Andrew Greenwood	Stephen Medcalf	Jamie Vartan	Helena Dix
2014	Salomé	Mariotte	French	1908	David Angus	Rosetta Cucchi	Tiziano Santi / Claudia Pernigotti	Na'ma Goldman, Nora Sourouzian, Scot Wilde, Igor Golovatenko
2014	Don Bucefalo	Cagnoni	Italian	1847	Sergio Alapont	Kevin Newbury	Vita Tzykun / Jessica Jahn	Filippo Fontana, Marie-Eve Munger, Jennifer Davis
2014	Silent Night	Puts	English, French, German	2011	Michael Christie	Tomer Zvulun	Erhard Rom / Vita Tzykun	Quentin Hayes, Chad Johnson
2015	Koanga	Delius	English	1896	Stephen Barlow	Michael Gieleta	James Macnamara	Norman Garrett, Nozuko Teto, Christopher Robertson, Rachel Croash
2015	Guglielmo Ratcliff	Mascagni	Italian	1895	Francesco Cilluffo	Fabio Ceresa	Tiziano Santi	Angelo Villari, Mariangela Sicilia, Annunziata Vestri, David Stout, Quentin Hayes, Sarah Richmond
2015	Le pré aux clercs	Hérold	French	1832	Jean-Luc Tingaud	Eric Ruf	Laurant Delvert	Marie-Eve Munger, Marie Lenormand, Magali Simard-Galdès, Dominique Côté
2016	Vanessa	Barber	English	1958	Timothy Myers	Rodula Gaitanou	Cordelia Chisholm	Claire Rutter, Rosalind Plowright
2016	Maria de Rudenz	Donizetti	Italian	1838	Andrew Greenwood	Fabio Ceresa	Gary McCann	Gilda Fiume
2016	Herculanum	Félicien David	French	1859	Jean-Luc Tingaud	Stephen Medcalf		Andrew Haji, Olga Busuioc, Daniela Pini
2017	Medea	Cherubini	Italian	1797	Stephen Barlow	Fiona Shaw	—	Lise Davidsen, Raffaella Lupinacci, Adam Lau, Ruth Iniesta
2017	Margherita	Jacopo Foroni	Italian	1848	Timothy Myers	Michael Sturm	—	Giuliana Gianfaldoni, Alessandra Volpe, Matteo d’Apolito, Andrew Stenson, Yuriy Yurchuk
2017	Risurrezione	Franco Alfano	Italian	1904	Francesco Cilluffo	Rosetta Cucchi	Tiziano Santi	Gerard Schneider, Anne Sophie Duprels
2018	L'oracolo & Mala vita	Leoni & Giordano	Italian	1905 & 1892	Francesco Cilluffo	—	—	Joo Won Kang, Elisabetta Farris, Sergio Escobar
2018	Il bravo	Mercadante	Italian	1839	Jonathan Brandani	—	—	Ekaterina Bakanova, Yasko Sato, Rubens Pelizzari and Alessandro Luciano
2018	Dinner at Eight	William Bolcom	English	2017	David Agler	Tomer Zvulun	Alexander Dodge	Mary Dunleavy, Susannah Biller, Brenda Harris
2019	The Veiled Prophet	Stanford						
2019	Don Quichotte	Massenet	French	1904	Timothy Myers	Rodula Gaitanou	takis	Aigul Akhmetshina, Goderdzi Janelidze, Olafur Sigurdarson
2019	Dorilla in Tempe	Vivaldi	Italian	1726	Andrea Marchiol	Fabio Ceresa	Massimo Checchetto	
2019	La Cucina	Andrew Synnott	Italian	2019	Michele Spotti	Rosetta Cucchi	Tiziano Santi	
2021	Ein Wintermärchen	Goldmark	German	1908	Marcus Bosch	Dmitry Bertman	Astrid Janson	Sergei Radchenko; Sophie Gordeladeze; Deanna Breiwick
2021	Le songe d'une nuit d'été	Thomas	French	1850	Guillaume Tourniaire	Walter Le Mals	Tiziano Santi; Gabrielle Mayer	Hasmik Torosyan; Valentina Mastrangelo
2021	Edmea	Catalani	Italian	1886	Francesco Cilluffo	Julia Burbach		Anne Sophie Durprels; Ivan Shcherbatykh, Raffaele Abete
2021	I Capuleti e i Montecchi	Bellini	Italian	1830	Giuseppe Montesano	Conor Hanratty		Anna Brady; Jade Phoenix
2022	La tempesta	Halévy	Italian	1850	Francesco Cilluffo	Roberto Catalano		Nikolay Zemlianskikh; Hila Baggio; Giorgi Manoshvili; Jade Phoenix
2022	Lalla-Roukh	Félicien David	French	1862	Steven White	Orpha Phelan		Gabrielle Philiponet;Pablo Bemsch
2022	Armida	Antonín Dvořák	Czech	1904	Norbert Baxa	Hartmut Schorghofer		Jozef Benci;Jennifer Davis
2022	Cinderella	Alma Deutscher	English	2015	Andrew Synnott	Davide Gasparro		Megan O'Neill; Michael Bell; Richard Shaffrey; Ami Hewitt; Corina Ignat
2022	The Master	Alberto Caruso	English	2022				Thomas Birch; James Wafer; Annabella-Vesela Ellis
2022	The Spectre Knight	Alfred Cellier	English	1878				Jennifer Lee; Thomas Bennett; Monwabisi Lindi; Matthew Nuttall
2023	Zoraida di Granata	Donizetti	Italian	1822	Diego Ceretta			
2023	L'aube rouge	Camille Erlanger	French	1911	Guillaume Tourniaire			
2023	La ciociara	Marco Tutino	Italian	2015	Francesco Cilluffo			
2024	Le maschere	Pietro Mascagni	Italian	1901	Francesco Cilluffo	Stefano Ricci	Stefano Ricci	
2025	Le Trouviere	Giuseppe Verdi	French	1857				
2025	The Magic Fountain	Frederick Delius	English	1895				
2026	Iris	Pietro Mascagni	Italian	1898				
2026	L'Equivoco Stravagante	Giachino Rossini	Italian	1811				
2026	The Gambler	Sergei Prokofiev	Russian	1929				

== Sources ==
- Creative teams and singers for seasons 1951–2007: Lewis, Kevin (2008). What the Doctor Ordered: an Encyclopedia of Wexford Festival Opera since 1951. Dublin: Nonsuch Publishing. ISBN 978-1-84588-597-7.
- Creative teams and singers for the 2008–2012 seasons: the programme books for those years.
- Chronological list of operas: the 2012 Wexford Festival Opera programme book.
- "Operas Performed at the Wexford Festival, 1951-1972". Opera, Autumn 1973, Festival Issue, pp. 18–21.
- The Programme Books for 2019, 2020, 2021 and 2022
