= Eleanor Greenwood =

Australian mezzo-soprano

Eleanor Jean Greenwood is an Australian Soprano best known as an opera singer. She is a graduate of the Royal Academy of Music Opera Studio in London, England.. In 2023, she won the Opera Awards prize for Australian Opera singers adjudicated by soprano Cheryl Barker AO, conductor Simon Kenway and baritone Jose Carbo. Her roles include Turandot, Tosca, Wagner roles such as Sieglinde, and Verdi heroines.

== Career ==
Her debut with Wexford Festival Opera was as Pachole in Maria by Roman Statkowski. She has performed roles including Hänsel in Hänsel und Gretel, Rosina in Il barbiere di Siviglia, Count Orlofsky in Die Fledermaus, La Ciesca in Gianni Schicchi, Endimione in La Calisto, The Wife in Paradise Moscow (Cheryomushki), L'Enfant in L'Enfant et les sortileges. She has performed roles in The Cunning Little Vixen by Janáček. She is the sister of Australian musicologist Andrew Greenwood.
