= Cucina =

Cucina (Italian "cuisine" or "kitchen") or La cucina may refer to:

- La Cucina (film)
- La Cucina (band)
- La Cucina (opera) 2019
