= Tempesta =

Tempesta may refer to:

- La tempesta, The Tempest (Giorgione), a famous Renaissance painting by Italian master Giorgione dated between 1506 and 1508
- La tempesta, Tempest (1958 film)
- La tempesta (opera), an Italian-language opera based on Shakespeare's The Tempest

== See also ==
- Tempesta (surname)
