= Michael Geller-Gieleta =

British director and rights activist

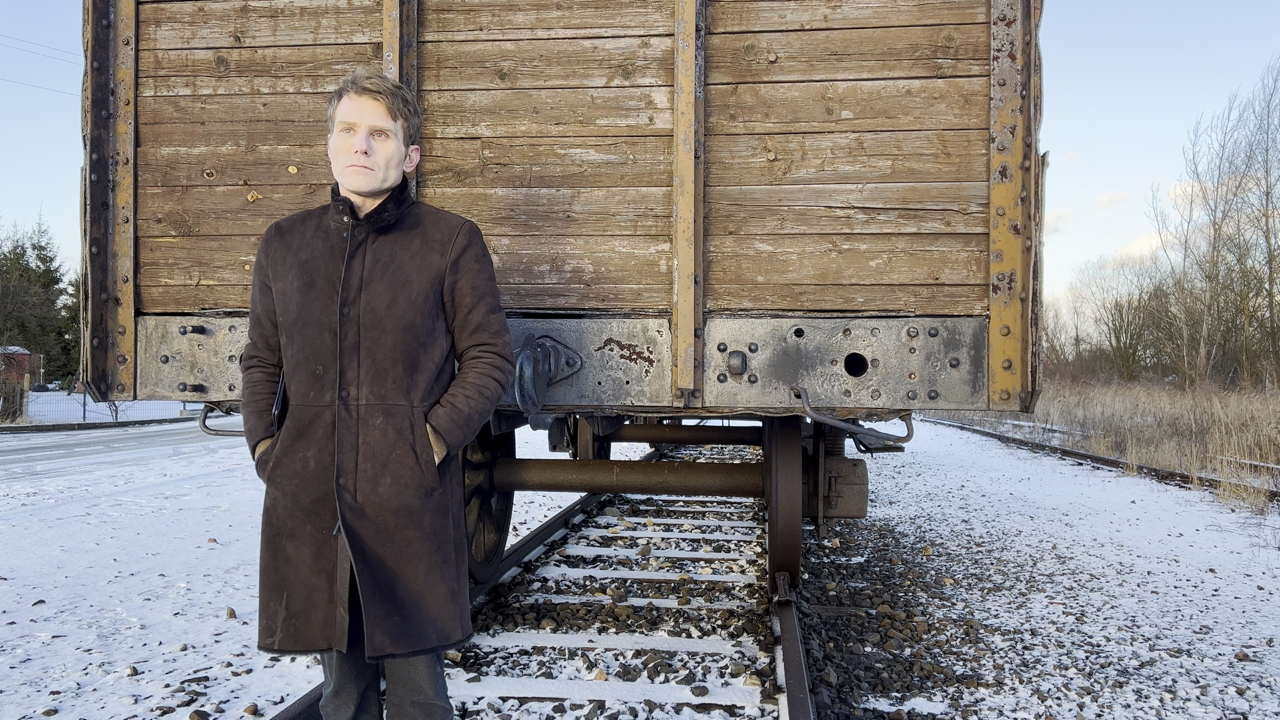
- Geller-Gieleta in 2022
- Born: 16 January 1974 (age 52)
- Occupation: theatre and cinema director; human rights activist
- Education: Oxford University
- Period: 1990s–present

Michael Geller-Gieleta (born 16 January, 1974) is a British stage director and civil-rights advocate. He served as the artistic director of the Cherub Theatre Company, and has directed theatre, opera and film productions internationally, including the production of Tosca. As a rights advocate, Geller-Gieleta founded Theatre Against Antisemitism in November 2023, a non-profit initiative aimed at combatting prejudice in the performing arts industry and beyond.

== Early life and education ==
Geller-Gieleta was born in Rome in 1974; his mother is of Polish-Jewish descent and his father is Italian. He went to primary school in then-Communist Poland, before settling in London. After a brief acting stint in Agnieszka Holland's 1990 film Europa, Europa, (Note: Geller-Gieleta played the role of a young Komsomol Youth League leader) he decided to pursue a directing career solely. At the age 18 Geller-Gieleta spent two terms at the National Theatre Academy of Warsaw. He later studied at Oxford University, graduating with MA(Oxon) in English Language and Literature. He is fluent in French, Italian, Russian, Polish and German. (Note: translated several professionally produced plays from French into English and 18th century French literature into Polish for the TVP Theatre)

In 2003, Geller-Gieleta trained as a director at the National Theatre Studio (London) and then at the Istituto degli Studi Teatrali (Milano University). During his training years, he was mentored by artists including Giorgio Strehler, Franco Zeffirelli, Sir Richard Eyre, Katie Mitchell, Howard Davies, Sir Nicholas Hytner. Geller-Gieleta was an associate artist at the Royal Academy of Dramatic Art, and has directed at the Royal College of Music, Birmingham Conservatoire, Yale University and Rose Bruford College. Geller-Gieleta is also a trained pianist.

== Career ==
=== Theatre ===
Geller-Gieleta's early theatre directing works include Chekhov's The Seagull in 1997 and William Gibson's Two for the Seesaw in 1998, both at the Old Fire Station Theatre in Oxford. He went on to direct three plays at the Minerva Theatre in Chichester: Howard Barker's Scenes from an Execution, Reginald Berkeley's White Chateaux, and August Strindberg's The Stronger. That year, he also directed Terrence McNally's A Perfect Ganesh at the Gielgud Theatre. In 2000 he directed Wally Daly's The Mary's at the Southwark Playhouse (London) and Yvonne Arnaud (Guildford).

In 2000, Geller-Gieleta was the assistant-director at Sir Tom Stoppard's Arcadia with director Peter Wood, and Heartbreak House (with BAFTA-winning director Christopher Morahan), both at the Chichester Festival Theatre. Geller-Gieleta's devised and adapted Kurt Weill's Last Train From Berlin at the Chichester Festival Theatre, and Cy Coleman's Seesaw at the Bridewell Theatre. In 2001, Geller-Gieleta directed the world premiere of the original stage version of Oscar-winning film Judy, Last Song of the Nightingale by Peter Quilter (casting Tracie Bennett). In 2002 he was an assistant director at The Tempest, co-created with RSC Artistic Director Michael Boyd; and in 2003 at the West End play by Pirandello, Absolutely! (perhaps?) in a new adaptation by Martin Sherman, directed by Franco Zeffirelli and starring Dame Joan Plowright.

Geller-Gieleta directed two of Stephen Sondheim's works: Anyone Can Whistle in its British premiere at Bridewell Theatre (starring Olivier-Award winner Janie Dee) in 2003, and Company at the Oxford Playhouse (starring Olivier-Award winner Rory Kinnear) in 2009.

He further directed Rosemary Friedman's Change of Heart (New End Theatre, London); Shakespeare's Twelfth Night at the Haugesund Festiviteten] (Norway, 2005); Nilo Cruz's Hortensia and the Museum of Dreams at Finborough Theatre (London, 2005); Tena Stivicic's Fragile! and Fabrice Lesquiot's Le Mariage at the Arcola Theatre, London (in 2007 and 2008, respectively); Glyn Maxwell's Mimi and the Stalker at Theatre 503 (in 2008); Tom Stoppard's Artist Descending a Staircase at the Old Red Lion (2009); Noël Coward's Bitter Sweet at the Bard Summerscape starring Sian Phillips (NYC, 2011); and Peter Shaffer's Amadeus at the Maltz Jupiter Theater (2012).

In 2010, he directed the world premiere of Peter Nichols' Lingua Franca at Finborough Theatre, London and later at off-Broadway 59E59 Theater in New York.

From 2005 to 2011, Geller-Gieleta served as the artistic director of The Cherub Theatre Company of London, and was appointed to the Board of Trustees (which consisted of diverse industry professionals). Geller-Gieleta managed production, directing and casting of works by contemporary playwrights, (Note: Including Peter Nichols, Tom Stoppard, Gao Xingjian, Glyn Maxwell, Martin Sherman, Arthur Laurents, Stephen Sondheim, Cy Coleman, Ronald Harwood, Nilo Cruz, Tiziano Terzani, Fabrice Melquiot and Howard Barker.) and within is role secured funds from the Arts Council of England, EEA and Norway Grants, The Polish Cultural Institute in London and NY, and the Institut français du Royaume-Uni.

Geller-Gieleta's Italian adaptation of Slobodzianek's Our Class opened the Roma Teatro Festival in 2012, addressing the subject of pogroms, deportations and betrayal in war-time Poland. Attended by the Roman Jewish Community, the production faced an objection from Rome's Polish community due to its "controversial" contents.

=== Opera ===
Geller-Gieleta started his career in opera as Associate and assistant director on the operas The Queen of Spades at The Royal Opera House (directed by Francesca Zambello), and at Katya Kabanova (directed by with Nikolaus Lehnhoff) as well as Carmen (directed by David McVicar), both at the Glyndebourne Festival Opera, between 2000 – 2022.

In September 2005, Geller-Gieleta directed his first opera production in South Africa, Lucia di Lammermoor, at the State Theatre in Pretoria. Following the production's success, he directed further opera productions at Pretoria State Theatre: Cavalleria Rusticana and Pagliacci, both in 2006, followed by Madama Butterfly, L'elisir d'amore and Don Pasquale in 2007), as well as Manon in November that year, at Cape Town Opera (starring Pretty Yende). He supported the involvement of South African singers, dancers, choreographers and designers through his productions in Europe and the US.

For three seasons, Geller-Gieleta directed at the Wexford Festival Opera productions of Smetana's Hubicka (in October 2010), Statkowski's Maria (October 2011), and Delius's Koanga (October 2015). Maria and Hubicka were nominated by the Irish Theatre Awards and became international co-productions.

Working in the United States, Geller-Gieleta directed The Magic Flute at the Chicago Opera Theater in September 2012. In 2013, he directed The Kiss at the Opera Theatre of Saint Louis. In the subsequent year, he was an associate professor with emerging artists' programs at Yale School of Music, directing productions of Iolanta and La Bohème at the Shubert Theatre. During 2014, Geller-Gieleta directed the operas Der Schauspieldirektor and Le Rossignol at the Santa Fe Opera. In June 2015 he directed at Saint Louis again, this time directing the opera La Rondine. In March 2016, Geller-Gieleta directed the world premiere of Carlisle Floyd's Prince of Players at Houston Grand Opera and Florentine Opera, which was released by Virgin Records and won a Grammy nomination.

In 2021, Geller-Gieleta directed Tosca at the Wroclaw Opera. Following wide acclaim, in July 2022 he directed the opera at the Irish National Opera. The play won the Production of the Year Award at the Kiepura Awards, and garnered awards in five categories. It was broadcast starring Roberto Alagna and Aleksandra Kurzak in global cinemas in October 2024.

== Social/civil rights ==
=== Helping artists, war victims, others ===
Geller-Gieleta has conducted workshops and masterclasses for emerging stage talents in the UK, to breakthrough the lack of employment in the arts industry. He was a mentor at the Arts Council of England for future theatre practitioners in the London borough of Haringey, and worked to diverse educational community projects attracting London's ethnic and cultural minorities.

Geller-Gieleta has overseen and raised funds for a Cape Town-based charity committed to educating women victims of Central African ethnic cleansing.

As LGBT-rights advocate, at the height of the anti-LGBT riots in Poland, Geller-Gieleta translated, financed, produced and directed Moisés Kaufman's The Laramie Project (Dramatyczny Theatre, Warsaw).

In 2022, he created the UK for Ukraine: For Art's Sake program with the goal of aiding artist refugees fleeing Ukraine, and helped provide basic needs and housing for dozens of Ukrainian families, introducing them to British cultural figures who provided mentoring sessions, and provided free theatre/concert tickets.

=== Combating antisemitism ===
Since October 2023, Michael has been documenting the ongoing process of unprecedented cancellation of Israeli artists by the international arts community and their audiences. He created the Theatre Against Antisemitism project in order to challenge rising antisemitism in the arts industry and elsewhere, regularly updating across social media.

In 2020–2022, Geller-Gieleta worked with the Arkivet Peace and Human Rights Centre in Norway, participating in the panels commemorating International Holocaust Remembrance Day, and working with outreach programs aimed at deepening the general understanding of the second and third-generation survivors' trauma. In January 2022, he created the autobiographical documentary The Burnt Offering, marking the 80th anniversary of the Wannsee Conference while tracking the final months of his grand-paternal family from Lwów before they were transferred from Lwów Ghetto to the Belzec death camp. The publication of his essays documenting his ongoing search for family survivors was postponed by the Arkivet Centre after the Israel-Gaza War of 2023 broke.

In 2017 Michael was the Polish Ministry of Culture's nominee for a vice-director position responsible for artistic leadership at National Old Theatre in Cracow (the town his grand-maternal family was transported to Birkenau from). After experiencing what he deemed as antisemitic and homophobic slurs from the local industry, he withdrew his candidacy from the position.

== Personal life ==
At the time of the October 7 Hamas attacks, Geller-Gieleta was in Israel. Geller-Gieleta adopted a double-barrelled surname officially, in response to October 7 massacre, in recognition of his maternal family murdered in the Holocaust.

Geller-Gieleta is a life-long sufferer of genetic Ashkenazi dystonia.
