= Rory Macdonald =

Rory Macdonald may refer to:

- Rory MacDonald (musician), Scottish songwriter and musician
- Rory Macdonald (conductor) (born 1980), Scottish conductor
- Rory MacDonald (fighter) (born 1989), Canadian professional mixed martial artist
