= Scorpio Rising (band) =

English rock band

- Scorpio Rising in 1993

Background information
- Origin: Birkenhead, Merseyside, U.K.
- Genres: Fraggle, baggy
- Years active: 1989–1994
- Labels: Sire
- Past members: Mickey Banks; Sploote Lead; Martin Atherton; David Renton; Steve Soar; Mandi Morgan; Colin Owens

Scorpio Rising were an English rock band from Birkenhead active from 1989 to 1994.

== History ==
Scorpio Rising was formed in Birkenhead in 1989. The group's first live performances took place in small clubs in Liverpool, with several shows at Liverpool Planet X and Cosmos Clubs in late 1989. The original lineup featured David "Stig" Renton on bass guitar. Scorpio Rising's definitive lineup and sound were created when bass player Steve Soar joined the band in 1992, whose influences included Parliament/Funkadelic.

Scorpio Rising signed to Chapter 22 Records (UK) and Sire Records (US).

The Scorpio Rising cited their biggest influences as the genres of fraggle with the dance elements of baggy. Some critics of the time took to referring to this fusion as "bagel". Their earliest recordings feature frequent use of wah-wah pedals and breakbeat/baggy drum patterns contemporary during the early nineties.

Scorpio Rising came to the attention of the UK music press in 1991 with the release of "Watermelon", their first major-backed single on Chapter 22 Records. For a brief period, their breakbeat-flavoured drums, distorted rock guitars and "new lad superstar" (NME 1991) frontman Mickey Banks was hailed as a new direction for UK indie/rock music. At this time the band recorded the six-track mini album If.... It featured a new rock sound different from the band's contemporaries, with funk-influenced basslines, soft psychedelic guitars on the slower tracks and Stooges-style rock guitars backed with "baggy" rhythms for the first time on the faster tracks. The album was well received by the UK music press, leading to sold-out headlining dates across the UK and rave reviews of the live shows, which started to feature stage diving by the audiences.

Scorpio Rising toured the UK with Smashing Pumpkins, PWEI, Ned's Atomic Dustbin, Eat, Senseless Things and other contemporary bands of the early 1990s, culminating with appearances at Finsbury Park and Reading Festival in 1992. Scorpio Rising then recorded their one and only full-length album, Pig Symphony.

Scorpio Rising utilised ripped speakers, metal pipe acoustics and vintage film studio equipment while recording Breathing Underwater/Zero for Chapter 22 in Ed's Garage (now a defunct vintage recording studio in Camden Town, London) in 1992. This session (co-produced by Teo Miller who also produced Daisy Chainsaw) generated interest from Sire, who the band signed with after Seymour Stein flew from New York to see them headline the Marquee club in London in 1992. The ensuing album, Pig Symphony, was recorded over Christmas 1992 at Rockfield Studios, Monmouth, and was again produced by Teo Miller with the band.

During the 1993 PWEI tour preceding the release of Pig Symphony, bassist Steve Soar left the band and they went into the studio as a four piece. Soar appears on "Breathing Underwater" and "Fountain Of You"; both recorded during the Breathing Underwater sessions at Ed's Garage; he was replaced by Mark Browning from The Bell Tower for the remainder of the tour and some following shows. Bass guitar on Pig Symphony was played by Bank and lead guitarist Sploote Lead. The band experimented heavily with ambient acoustics and darker material. The album includes longer, darker and more psychedelic tracks: "Oceanside" and "Sleeping Sickness" and extremely heavy guitar and vocal eq processing. Pig Symphony was mixed at Amazon/Parr St Studios in Liverpool. The album was well received by college radio in the US and received significant airplay, selling 30,000 units without advertising or tour support (both ostensibly due to internal reorganisation at Sire).

After recruiting bass player Mandi Morgan, Scorpio Rising returned to the studio to record the follow-up for Sire/Elektra, titled Brutal Deluxe. The new album was produced by Steve Osborne of Perfecto, producer of Happy Mondays' Pills 'n' Thrills and Bellyaches and U2. Recorded and mixed in 1993 at Orinoco and Battery Studios in London, Brutal Deluxe took Scorpio Rising in a new direction, and included the unique thrash/trance track "Bugcatcher", which was later remixed by Steve Osborne and included in Paul Oakenfold's Goa trance sets for Radio 1. The album was never released by Sire.

== After Scorpio Rising ==
Banks and drummer Colin Owens worked together briefly under the name "Lounge", working with Nik Nicholl (former Black Grape manager) and Don Letts of BAD fame. Owens went on to successfully form, record and tour the UK and Europe with his breakbeat band Surreal Madrid, finally returning to his rock and roll roots with the Southampton-based band Black Kat Boppers together with Roy Phillips, and Dylan Clarke of La Cucina.

Banks left the music industry in 1996. Apart from a very brief guest vocal with the Perfecto/cult trance artist "Man With No Name", he disappeared from music for 12 years, eventually returning to live gigs in London in 2008, with Lead again on lead guitar and his 22-year-old son Jimmy on drums in the volatile instrumental "Surfcore" power trio Jimmy and The Destroyers. The Destroyers (renowned for destroying the stage and often injuring themselves) used The Camden Underworld as their base and played only 35 shows mainly in London, with cult punk bands The Vibrators, The Dickies, and Agent Orange, briefly appearing at Liverpool Sound City in 2009 with The Damned. They recorded one studio EP, "The Surfcore EP", which was given away for free to their online fanbase. Their final gig was at the now defunct Gaff on Holloway Road, London.

After the Destroyers split in November 2010, Banks moved to Amsterdam to work on an even more stripped down sound. He returned to Manchester, UK in 2012, where he began playing solo using a four string guitar as The Sonic Gypsy in bars in Manchester and Liverpool. Banks and Lead finally reunited under The Sonic Gypsy name in June 2012. The Sonic Gypsy's set occasionally includes parts from Pig Symphony's darkest song "Oceanside" and the unreleased "Apocalypse Ranch" from Scorpio Rising's lost Brutal Deluxe album. Martin Atherton returned to music with the acoustic trio Qatsi in 2012. The band play frequently in Liverpool, showcasing Atherton's unique chord styles and compositions.

=== The Sonic Gypsy ===
In 2015, Banks recorded his debut solo album Born A Rolling Stone at Demon Studios, Manchester, which had a limited release in March 2015 to critical acclaim, and began gigging with a new sonic rock band The Sonic Gypsy Band, featuring Lead on lead guitar, Purcy Flaherty on harmonica, Piers Pennell on bass and Mon Duncalf on drums. He also appears with Shooter Jennings in Manchester. A music video was made and released in 2017 featuring Banks with the track "I Was Born A Rolling Stone". The album features revisited versions of Scorpio Rising's "Honeykill" and "Apocalypse Ranch". The Born A Rolling Stone version of the Sonic Gypsy band performed at the Desertfest in May 2017, as well as at the Solfest, the Sonic Rock Solstice Festival, and the Black Deer Festival. Banks now lives off grid as a continuous cruiser on his narrowboat The Heart Of Gold on the London waterways, and is the host of the controversial "Sonic Gypsy Radio Show". As of 2021, Banks and Lead are recording a 22-track double studio album at Viva Recorders Studio in London.

The Sonic Gypsy Born A Rolling Stone tracklist:

1. The Unprecedented Return Of Mr Majestyk
2. I Was Born A Rolling Stone
3. Lucifer's Lament
4. Shotgun Tel
5. Meet Me By The River
6. Backyard Stomp No2
7. Apocalypse Ranch Revisited
8. Honeykill
9. Mouthful Of Cactus (You Cant Kill A Good Thing)
10. Backyard Stomp No1 (Let The Good Times Roll)
11. Disclaimer Boogie

== Members ==
- Mickey Banks – vocals (1989–1994)
- Sploote Lead – lead guitar (1989–1994)
- Martin Atherton – rhythm guitar (1989–1994)
- David Renton – bass (1989–1992)
- Steve Soar – bass (1992–1993; died 2022)
- Mandi Morgan – bass (1993–1994)
- Colin Owens – drums (1989–1994)

== Discography ==
=== Albums ===
- IF.. (1992), Chapter 22
- Zodiac Killers (1992), Sire – US compilation
- Pig Symphony, Sire
- Brutal Deluxe (unreleased)

=== Singles, EPs ===
- Stranges Times EP (1991), Chapter 22 – "The Strangest Things Turn You On" / "Burn Out" / "Bliss"
- The Watermelon EP (1991), Chapter 22 – "Watermelon" / "Beautiful People" / "Malicious"
- "Saturnalia" / "Disturbance" / "Peace Frog" (1992), Chapter 22
- "Silver Surfing" / "Fountain of You" / "Zero" (1993), Chapter 22
- "Evelyn" / "Its Obvious" / "Find Your Own Way" / "Brutal Deluxe" (1993), Sire
- 12" white label single: to radio only: Bugcatcher/Dubcatcher
