= New Opera Company =

1956–84 British opera company

The New Opera Company was a British opera company active during the period 1956 to 1984. It was mainly based at Sadler's Wells Theatre, London and later worked in co-ordination with English National Opera. The company was responsible for the premieres or major revivals of important work in the operatic canon.

== History ==
The Cambridge university opera company was formed in 1956 and the following year became the New Opera Company. The founders of the company were the conductor Leon Lovett, the administrator Peter Hemmings and musicologist Brian Trowell. Its inaugural productions were welcomed with enthusiasm by London critics; Andrew Porter praised the conducting of Lovett and Trowell's production of The Rake's Progress while in A Tale of Two Cities Lovett was described as a "born conductor of opera", Besch's production was commended in the "spirited and effective performance". From 1957 to 1967 there was a close association between the New Opera Company and Sadler's Wells Opera with costume and scenery loans, assistance with technical equipment, and the engagement of singers.

In the early 1970s the Arts Council considerably increased its grant, and the Greater London Council also gave funding. In 1971 Charles Mackerras and Anthony Besch joined the artistic council of the New Opera Company.

In 1973 Anthony Besch was the Director of Productions. By that year the company had produced 34 works, of which 13 were world premieres and 12 were British premieres; works by 12 British composers were among those performed. Although mainly based in London it gave a few independent productions elsewhere. Small-scale music theatre productions included Time Off? Not a Ghost of a Chance! (Elisabeth Lutyens), Dawnpath (Nicola LeFanu), A Full Moon in March (John Harbison) and Inner Voices (Brian Howard).

In 1973 the ENO association was renewed and Edmund Tracey, Drama and Text director of Sadler's Wells Opera, joined the New Opera Company board, with Jeremy Caulton, assistant to Lord Harewood becoming general manager of the company. After collaborating with English National Opera for several years, their only association of a planned series with Opera North was in October 1984 in Leeds, with a run in London.

The withdrawal of Arts Council funding was announced as part of the report 'The Glory of the Garden' and the company ceased operation after 1984. Grove comments that its "service to London opera in introducing new works, mostly in highly effective performances, was unparalleled".

== Repertory ==
Within its repertoire the company performed many rare operas:

- The Rake's Progress (1957) London premiere
- A Tale of Two Cities (Arthur Benjamin) (1957) stage premiere
- Sir John in Love (Vaughan Williams) (1958)
- Lord Bateman (Arnold Foster) (1958) premiere
- Der Revisor (Egk) (1958) British premiere
- Il prigioniero (1959) British premiere
- Die Kluge (Orff) (1959)
- The Diary of a Madman (Humphrey Searle) (1960)
- Volpone (Francis Burt) (1961) British premiere
- The Departure (Elizabeth Maconchy) (1962) premiere
- Boulevard Solitude (Henze) (1962) British premiere
- The Wager (Buxton Orr) (1962) premiere
- The Knife (Daniel Jones) (1963) premiere
- Tartuffe (Arthur Benjamin) (1964) premiere
- The Fiery Angel (1965) British premiere
- The What d'ye call-it (Phyllis Tate) (1966) premiere
- The Decision (Thea Musgrave) (1967) premiere
- Cardillac (Hindemith) (1970) British premiere
- The Scene-Machine (Anthony Gilbert) (1972)
- The Nose Shostakovich (1973) British premiere, later broadcast
- Arden Must Die Goehr (1974) British premiere
- King Roger Szymanowski (1975) British premiere
- Bomarzo (Ginastera) (1976) British premiere
- Julietta (Martinů) (1978) British premiere
- Il cappello di paglia di Firenze (Rota) (1980)
- Inner Voices (Brian Howard) (1983) premiere
- A Full Moon in March (John Harbison) (1983)
- Jonny spielt auf (Krenek) (1984)
