= Anthony Besch =

Anthony John Elwyn Besch (5 February 1924 – 23 December 2002) was an English opera and theatre director. As a young man he worked at Glyndebourne assisting the directors Carl Ebert and Günther Rennert. His first work as an opera director was for Welsh National Opera in 1954. Among other British companies with whom he worked were Opera North, D'Oyly Carte, The Royal Opera, the Aldeburgh Festival and Garsington Opera. He was most closely associated with English National Opera (and its predecessor, Sadler's Wells Opera), Scottish Opera, and the New Opera Company.

Besch established an international reputation, and directed operas in continental Europe, North and South America and Australia. He was wary of "concept" productions, preferring to stage operas in a traditional manner, with what the critic Alan Blyth called "his scrupulous eye for what looked good and proved practical on stage."

== Life and career ==
=== Early years ===
Besch was born in London and educated at Rossall School, where he had his first contact with operatic performance, singing Captain Corcoran in H.M.S. Pinafore in a joint production with Alleyn's School. From Rossall he went on to Worcester College, Oxford, reading English, but while an undergraduate he was called up for military service and was assigned to the artillery. He was demobilised in 1947, and returned to Oxford, resuming his studies and embarking on a directorial career. In June of that year he directed Love's Labours Lost for the Oxford University Dramatic Society, with a cast including the future drama critic Kenneth Tynan. Later in the same year he persuaded Jack Westrup and the Opera Club to let him present Mozart's Idomeneo, which was then little known. The Times credited Besch's production with helping restore the work to the general repertoire. In 1948 he directed The Beggar's Opera for the club.

In 1949 Besch directed an adaptation of Jane Austen's Northanger Abbey at the Theatre Royal, Windsor. In 1950 he left Oxford, having graduated with a first class degree. He was recruited by Glyndebourne Festival Opera, where he worked for three years as assistant to Moran Caplat, the general administrator of the company. At Glyndebourne Besch also worked with the producers Carl Ebert and Günther Rennert. The Times commented, "It was a tough apprenticeship, where anyone less equable or less attentive to minutiae could well have come to grief." In 1953 he was given his first solo professional assignment as an opera director, with Verdi's The Sicilian Vespers for Welsh National Opera in 1954. In 1955 he worked with Sir Thomas Beecham at the Bath Festival on Gretry's Zémire et Azore.

=== Director ===
In 1957 Besch directed his first Glyndebourne production: Mozart's Der Schauspieldirektor, with the young Joan Sutherland as Mme Herz, in a double bill with Richard Strauss's Ariadne auf Naxos directed by Ebert. He joined Sadler's Wells Opera as a staff producer, tasked with keeping existing productions fresh for revivals in London and on tour.

From the late 1950s Besch began to gain an international reputation, but in the 1960s and 1970s he continued to work closely with Sadler's Wells, and with the New Opera Company, which specialised in modern operas and of which he was a guiding figure. He also worked extensively with Scottish Opera, where he became known for his staging of Mozart, Rossini and Britten. He directed only one production for the Royal Opera, La clemenza di Tito in 1974. As with his student production of Idomeneo, the 1974 Covent Garden Clemenza is credited with helping to rehabilitate the work. Colin Davis and the company took the production to La Scala, Milan later in 1974. His productions for Sadler's Wells (later ENO) included Count Ory, Tannhäuser, The Thieving Magpie, The Queen of Spades, Ariadne on Naxos, Don Giovanni, and The Magic Flute. Of the last of these, one critic wrote in 1975, "Anthony Besch has respected the spirit of Mozart and remained true to convention, tradition and, most important of all, to the score … The magic worked."

Besch worked with D'Oyly Carte (The Mikado and The Gondoliers); Opera North (The Tales of Hoffmann and Jonny Strikes Up); the Aldeburgh Festival (Punch and Judy); the Wexford Festival (Rossini's Otello, La jolie fille de Perth, Oberon and La rondine), and Garsington Opera (Haydn's L'infedeltà delusa).

Further afield, Besch directed Le Comte Ory and Death in Venice in Brussels; in the Americas he directed La favourita in Buenos Aires, Aïda in San Francisco, Rigoletto in St Louis, Carmen in San Diego and Il barbiere di Siviglia in Houston. In South Africa he directed Otello (Verdi's on this occasion) and in Australia, Così fan tutte, Die Fledermaus and The Rake's Progress.

The Guardian described him as "one of the most intelligent and musical opera directors of his generation", and added:

Though he maintained public silence about the conceptual extravagances of younger colleagues, his career demonstrated his belief in traditional methods. This is not to say that his productions were uninventive – far from it – but they were certainly never anti-musical; and they were always precise and illuminating.

=== Teacher ===
Besch taught opera direction at the London Opera Centre (1962–68), the University of Toronto (1969–70) and the Guildhall School of Music and Drama in London (1986–89).

=== Personal life ===
Besch's long-term partner was the designer John Stoddart; the two collaborated on several productions, including a Così fan tutte for Scottish Opera (1967) which many critics thought Besch's finest achievement.

In 1999 Besch suffered a stroke, and radically cut back on his work. He died in London on 23 December 2002, aged 78.
