= Liam Bonner =

American opera singer (born 1981)

Liam Bonner (born March 18, 1981) is a retired professional opera singer (baritone) from Pittsburgh, PA.

In his former career as an artist, Bonner was praised by Opera News for his "rich, versatile voice" and "beautiful instrument". Highlights of his performing career included his Metropolitan Opera, debut in 2010 as Morales in Carmen and the role of Horatio in Hamlet, which was one of the Metropolitan Opera's HD broadcasts that same season. He created the role of Lieutenant Audebert in the Pulitzer Prize winning opera, Silent Night, with Minnesota Opera and reprised the role with Opera Philadelphia and the Lyric Opera of Kansas City.

Bonner's repertoire included a majority of Britten baritone roles including the title role in Billy Budd with LA Opera, directed by Francesca Zambello and conducted by James Conlon, and Ned Keene in a concert version of Peter Grimes with the St Louis Symphony, performed at Carnegie Hall. He was very much at home in the French repertoire, performing such roles as Pelléas in Debussy's Pelléas and Mélisande with the Opera Theatre of Saint Louis, Zurga in Les pêcheurs de perles with New Orleans Opera, and the title role of Hamlet with Washington National Opera and conducted by Plácido Domingo.

Liam enjoyed mostly a stateside career, though notable international performances included Guglielmo in Così fan tutte with English National Opera in London, Henri de Valois in Chabrier's Le roi malgré lui with the Wexford Festival Opera in Wexford, Ireland, and The Elder Son in Britten's The Prodigal Son with Teatro dell'Opera Roma in Rome, Italy.

Bonner is a former member of the Houston Grand Opera, Studio, as well as San Francisco Opera's Merola Program and a Studio and Apprentice Artist at Central City Opera. He is the recipient of a Richard F. Gold Career Grant from the Shoshanna Foundation, a first-prize winner of the Gerda Lissner Foundation Competition, a national semi-finalist in the Metropolitan Opera National Council Auditions, and an award winner from the George London Foundation, the Lotte Lenya Competition, the First International Pavel Lisitsian Baritone Competition in Moscow, Russia, and the Houston Grand Opera's Eleanor McCollum Competition.

== Education ==
Bonner attended Central Catholic High School, earned a Bachelor of Fine Arts from Carnegie Mellon University, and a Master of Music from Manhattan School of Music. He is also an alumnus of the Houston Grand Opera Studio as well as San Francisco Opera's Merola Program and a former Studio and Apprentice Artist at Central City Opera.

== Performance career ==
In the 2010–2011 season Bonner sang Pelléas in Pelléas and Mélisande with the Opera Theatre of Saint Louis and covered the same role with The Metropolitan Opera, and that of Raimbaud in Le Comte Ory. He played Zurga in Les pêcheurs de perles with The New Orleans Opera and Ned Keene in Peter Grimes with the Houston Grand Opera.

In the 2009–2010 season, Bonner made his Washington National Opera debut in the title role of Hamlet under the baton of Plácido Domingo and returned to the Houston Grand Opera as Belcore in L'elisir d'amore.

Bonner's Metropolitan Opera debut was playing Morales in Carmen in 2010, and later, Horatio in Hamlet which was one of the Metropolitan Opera's HD broadcasts that season.

In 2010, Bonner sang his first performances of Malatesta in Don Pasquale with Opera New Jersey and as Yesterday's Beloved in Kurt Weill's Royal Palace with the Bard Music Festival

As a special alumnus guest artist with The Carnegie Mellon Philharmonic, Bonner made his Carnegie Hall debut, singing Gustav Mahler's Lieder eines fahrenden Gesellen. His European opera debut was as Guglielmo in Così fan tutte with The English National Opera.

Bonner was a recurring cast member at Houston Grand Opera, where he has performed roles including:

- Demetrius in A Midsummer Night's Dream
- Count in Le nozze di Figaro
- Redburn in Billy Budd
- The baritone soloist in Christopher Theofanidis' The Refuge (a recording of which is available commercially on the Albany Records label)
- Harašta in The Cunning Little Vixen
- Silvano in Un ballo in maschera
- Hortensius in La fille du regiment
- The Witch in Basil Twist's production of Hänsel und Gretel
- Morales in Carmen
- Dancaïro in Carmen

In 2007 Bonner joined The Wolf Trap Opera as Papageno in Die Zauberflöte. and again in 2008 as II Cavaliere di Befiore in Verdi's Un giorno di Regno. He has also appeared with The Berkshire Opera as the Count in Le nozze di Figaro, The Aspen Opera Theatre as Sid in Albert Herring, and with L'Opéra de Québec for its annual opera concert and gala.

As a soloist, Bonner has performed with the Houston Ballet in Stravinsky's Les Noces and Orff's Carmina Burana at Carnegie Mellon University. In addition, he sang selections from Mozart's operas with the Pittsburgh Symphony and, with the Czech Republic's Filharmonie Hradec Králové, a concert of popular opera pieces.
