= Norman Garrett =

- Born: 1981 or 1982
- Occupation: opera singer

Norman Garrett is an American baritone opera singer. He is best known for his performances in the role of Crown in the opera Porgy and Bess, which he has sung at the Glimmerglass Festival, Theater an der Wien in Vienna, the University of Michigan, Fort Worth Opera, Des Moines Metro Opera and Washington National Opera.

== Early life and education ==
Garrett was born in Cincinnati, Ohio, in 1981 or 1982. He earned his BM degree in voice from Texas Tech University and his MM degree, also in voice, from the University of Cincinnati – College-Conservatory of Music.

== Career ==
Garrett won the George London Award in memory of Lloyd Rigler in 2014. In the early part of his career he performed with the Kentucky Opera, the Cincinnati Opera and with the Philadelphia Center City Opera Theater. In the Domingo-Cafritz Young Artist Program at Washington National Opera, he appeared in two roles, as Steersman and as Masetto.

He appeared at the 64th Wexford Festival Opera in Ireland in the title role in Koanga (1904) by Frederick Delius.

Garrett sang the role of Jake in Porgy and Bess at the Lyric Opera of Chicago and debuted in the role of Jim at the Metropolitan Opera in 2019. He first appeared as Crown at Glimmerglass Festival's 2017 production of Porgy and Bess, where a review in Bachtrack said that he "was fully credible as Crown. ... Scary and exulting dark confidence, he justified the sway Crown held over [Bess]". Thereafter, he sang the role at Theater an der Wien in Vienna, the University of Michigan, Fort Worth Opera, Washington National Opera and Des Moines Metro Opera. Of his performance in Des Moines, a reviewer for Opera Today wrote: "Norman Garret was a colossal Crown. Not only is he an imposing and (in context) dangerous physical specimen, his booming, brooding baritone perfectly communicated his deadly serious intentions. 'A Red-Headed Woman' was delivered with zesty menace.

In 2018 in Des Moines, Garrett appeared in Flight by Jonathan Dove. In 2019, at the Munich Opera Festival he sang the role of Jim Larkens in Puccini's La fanciulla del West. In November 2022, he played Malcom X in X: The Life and Times of Malcolm X, the 1986 opera by Anthony Davis, at Opera Omaha. In June 2023 for his portrayal of Ned in Treemonisha by Scott Joplin, reimagined by composer Damien Sneed and librettist Karen Chilton at Opera Theatre of Saint Louis, a review in Opera Today stated: "Mr. Garret’s polished baritone brought authority and aural pleasure to his key moments, none more so than in his definitive, beautifully controlled melismatic rendering of 'When Villains Ramble Far and Near', which almost stopped the show. In 2024, in Tesori's Blue at the Lyric Opera of Chicago, he portrayed the Reverend.

In the early part of his career, Garrett sang in concerts with the Cincinnati Pops Orchestra, the Southwest Florida Symphony in Ft. Myers and with the Penn Symphony Orchestra. He has also been a recitalist with the Dolce Suono Ensemble. He was resident artist of Philadelphia's Academy of Vocal Arts for one year. He sang in Handel's Messiah in Ottawa, Ontario, Canada, Beethoven's Symphony No. 9 with the National Philharmonic Orchestra and in Phoenix, Orff's Carmina Burana at the Hollywood Bowl and in Toronto, Waltons Belshazzar’s Feast with the Phoenix Symphony and a Gershwin program with the Philadelphia Orchestra.

== Recording ==
- Fire Shut Up in My Bones by Terence Blanchard, conducted by Yannick Nézet-Séguin in the role of worker, Metropolitan Opera (videostream and radio broadcast on October 23, 2021)
