= Claude Schnitzler =

French organist and conductor

Claude Schnitzler (born in 1949) is a French organist and conductor.

== Career ==
Born in Strasbourg, Schnitzler studied music at the Conservatoire de Strasbourg (organ, harpsichord, conducting, and writing) before completing his training as a conductor at the Mozarteum University Salzburg while giving numerous organ recitals in France and abroad. In 1971, he was appointed titular organist of the great organ of the Strasbourg Cathedral.

He joined the Opéra national du Rhin in 1972 as a singing conductor and in 1975 became Alain Lombard's assistant at the Orchestre philharmonique de Strasbourg and at the Opéra national du Rhin, where he has since conducted numerous shows.

From 1981 to 1985, he collaborated regularly with the Paris Opera, where he conducted opera and ballet shows at both the Palais Garnier and the Salle Favart.

In 1986, he took over the direction of the Orchestra of the city of Rennes, combining this position with that of permanent conductor of the Opéra national du Rhin.

From 1989 to 1995, he was in charge of the Orchestre symphonique de Bretagne and continues to perform at the head of the main French orchestras (Orchestra of the Paris Opera, Orchestre philharmonique de Radio France, Orchestre national d'Île-de-France, Orchestra of the Opéra de Lyon, Orchestre National Bordeaux Aquitaine, Orchestre philharmonique de Montpellier) as well as in many foreign opera houses (Liceu of Barcelone, la Fenice of Venice, Teatro Regio of Turin, Théâtre Royal de la Monnaie in Brussels).

== Repertoire ==
He divides his time between the opera and the symphonic concert, where the traditional repertoire blends with the contemporary one. He directed the creation of Jean Prodromidès's Goya in Montpellier and Marseille; the French premiere of Britten's Owen Wingrave (at the Opéra du Rhin).

He directed Lucia di Lammermoor and Madame Butterfly in Rouen, The Tales of Hoffmann and Aida in Dublin, The Merry Widow in Toulouse, Tosca in Nancy, Fauré's Pénélope and Eugene Oneguin in Rennes, Siegfried and Götterdämmerung in Marseille, Goldmark's Die Königin von Saba at the Wexford Festival Opera, Carmen at the Peking opera, Pénélope in Lausanne, Verdi's Requiem in Metz with the Orchestre national de Lorraine.

In the summer of 1999, he was the guest of the Edinburgh Festival with the Scottish Chamber Orchestra. More recently, he has conducted Die Fledermaus at the Welsh National Opera of Cardiff, Hoffman's La Vie parisienne, The tales of Hoffmann, Der Wildschütz, Carmen, Roméo et Juliette in Leipzig, where he is a permanent guest conductor, as well as Alfred Bruneau's Le Rêve with the Orchestre national de France, Adrienne Lecouvreur in Lausanne, La Périchole in Nancy and Montpellier, Chabrier's Gwendoline and The Flying Dutchman in Rennes, Carmen and Eine Nacht in Venedig at the Volksoper de Vienna, Ariadne auf Naxos in Nice, Swan Lake with the Leipzig Gewandhaus Orchestra.

He made a remarkable debut at the Vienna State Opera in Gounod's Roméo et Juliette and was immediately re-employed there for the coming seasons: La Bohème, Lucia di Lammermoor, Roméo et Juliette, The Tales of Hoffmann, L'elisir d'amore, Massenet's Manon and Bizet's Carmen. Other projects include Dukas' Ariane et Barbe-Bleue in Nice, Smetana's The Bartered Bride and Die Fledermaus at the Vienna State Opera, La Traviata in Metz, The Tales of Hoffmann in Rennes, The Flying Dutchman in Dijon and symphonic concerts, in particular with the Orchestre symphonique et lyrique de Nancy. At the Opéra du Rhin, he has directed numerous productions, the most recent of which are Offenbach's Barbe-Bleue, Verdi's Rigoletto, Bartók's Bluebeard's Castle and Martinů's Ariane .

== Bibliography ==
- Marcel Thomann, 'Claude Schnitzler', Nouveau dictionnaire de biographie alsacienne, vol. 34, p. 3514 and vol. 47, p. 4930
