= Theatre Royal, Wexford =

Former opera house in Wexford, Ireland

Coordinates: 52.338193°N 6.462798°W

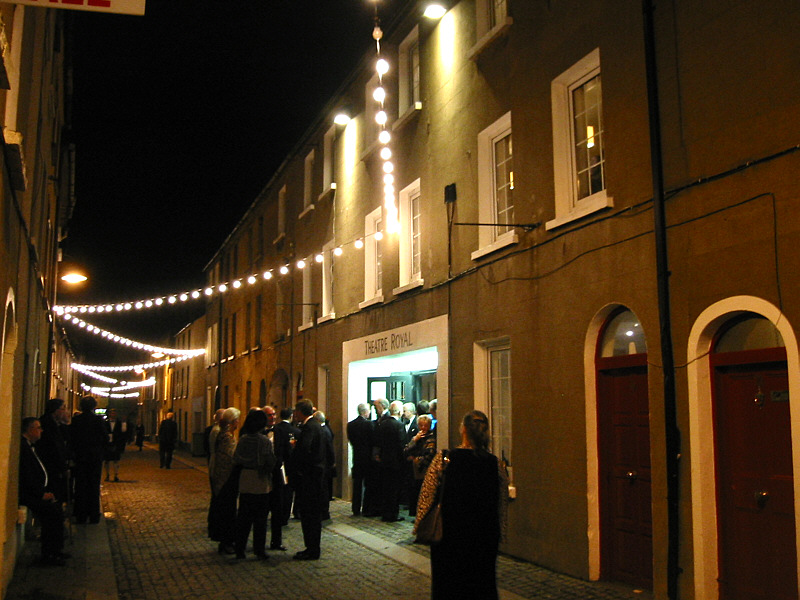
Theatre Royal during the opera festival

The Theatre Royal, was an opera house and performance venue in Wexford Ireland which opened in 1832 and closed in 2005. It was the home of the annual Wexford Festival Opera, and has now been replaced by The National Opera House.

== History ==
The theatre was constructed by William Taylor in 1831 and opened in January 1832. It became a social and cultural focus in the town during the 19th century, with frequent performances and visits from touring companies from England. The amateur Wexford Light Opera Society performed annually in the house. By 1942, the final private owner sold the building to a consortium, which converted it to a cinema.

Despite extensive alterations, the stage was retained and the building continued to be used by amateur societies. The biggest alteration was the removal of "the gods" or upper balcony, replaced by a steeply raked circle which existed until the building closed (in 2005). This work meant that the Wexford Opera Festival was not held in 1960.

The theatre was acquired by the Wexford Festival Trust in the 1950s and gradual restoration began to take place with a fundraising appeal being launched and help provided by the Irish Tourist Board. In 1973, work was undertaken in the foyers, and another major overhaul of the theatre was undertaken in 1987, although there was no need to miss a season as happened in 1960. A new foyer provided a more attractive entrance, extra rows of seats were cantilevered out over the back of the balcony, and a number of back-stage improvements were undertaken. The theatre re-opened on 5 September 1987, in time for the Wexford Opera Festival. This reconstruction allowed the festival's duration to be extended, and this was further helped by substantial foyer developments in 1993. Thus, the effect was a 28% increase in capacity per performance and a near doubling of seat capacity for the entire festival by the early 1990s, with sold-out houses being typical.

As the 1990s progressed, the festival was able to acquire a number of houses on the High Street behind the theatre. The result was additional cloakroom, toilets, and bar areas and a smoker's room, and later acquisitions allowed for conversion into offices the potential for direct access from the foyer to backstage without going through the auditorium. The largest acquisition, that of the old "The People Newspapers"’ property adjacent to the Theatre, was completed in 2000.

== Expansion ==
The 1832 Theatre Royal was demolished in early 2006 and was replaced by the National Opera House (also known as Wexford Opera House), a building 3½ times larger, on the same site. The new venue provides the Wexford Opera Festival with a modern venue of increased capacity.

Compared with the Theatre Royal, the new building includes:

- an increase in seating capacity to 771 to produce a state-of-the-art theatre designed specifically for opera with the auditorium having a rounder shape and an enhanced forestage which will bring audience and performers closer;
- a 176-seat studio space, adaptable as a rehearsal, exhibition and performance space;
- additional facilities backstage and front of house for artists and audiences including two foyers, an improved orchestra pit, administrative spaces, and side and rear stages for ease of scenery movement.
- "The Skyview Cafe", open year-round.

The aim is to be able to operate as a year-round arts venue for additional Wexford Festival productions as well as visiting productions.

The new facility opened on 5 September 2008 with a live broadcast of RTÉ's The Late Late Show. The first opera presented there was Rimsky-Korsakov's Snegurochka (The Snow Maiden) which opened on 16 October 2008.

== See also ==
- List of concert halls
- List of operas performed at the Wexford Festival
