= National Opera House =

Theatre in Wexford, Ireland

- Áras Náisiúnta Ceoldrámaíochta
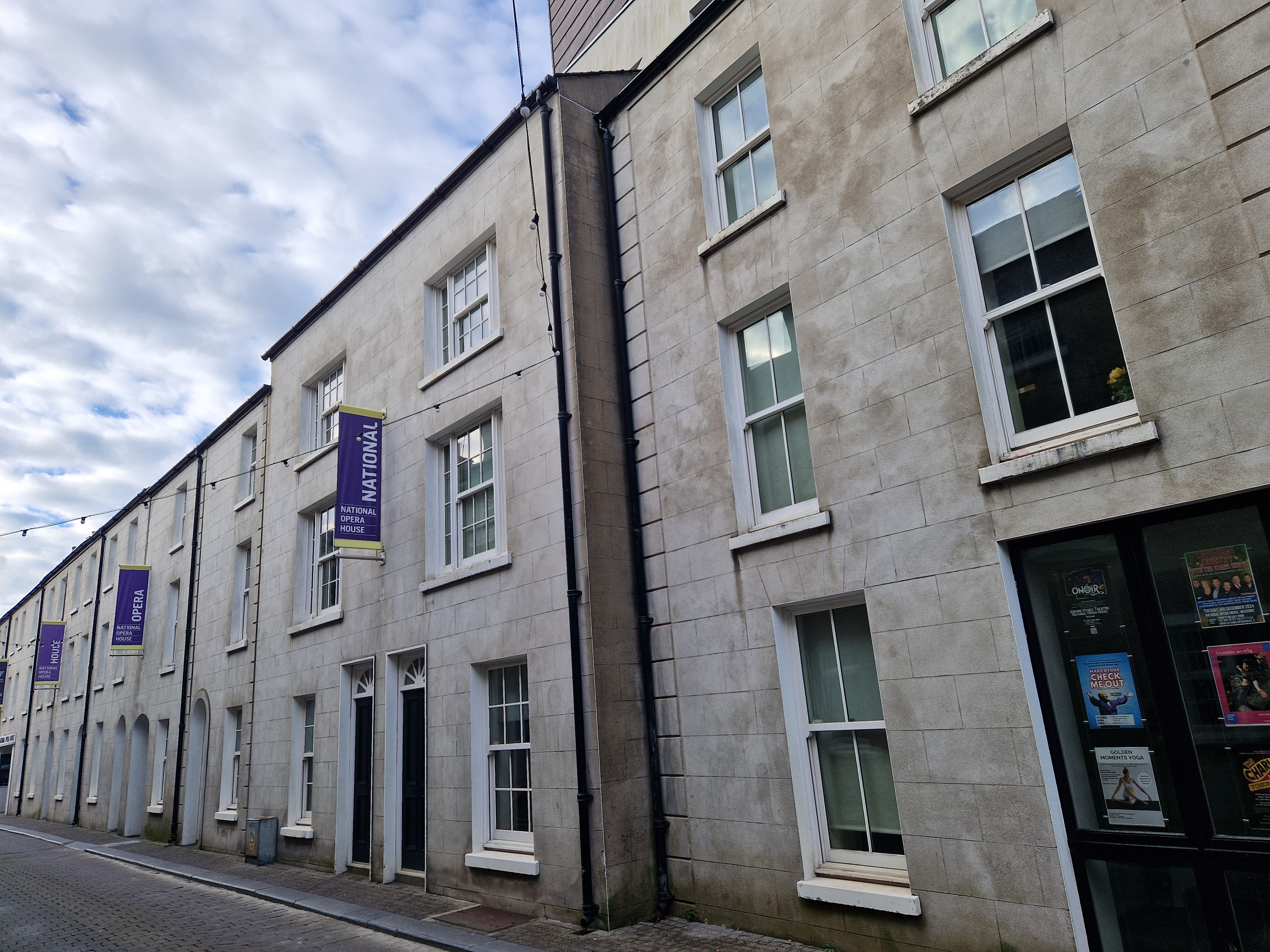
- Street entrance

- Location within Ireland
- Former names: Wexford Opera House

General information
- Type: Opera house
- Architectural style: Modern
- Location: Ireland, High Street, County Wexford, Ireland
- Coordinates: 52.338193°N 6.462798°W

Design and construction
- Architect: Keith Williams Architects
- Awards: 2009 Stirling Prize Nomination, 2009 RIBA Award, 2009 RIAI: Best Cultural Building, 2010 Civic Trust Award, 2010 AIA Award

Website
- nationaloperahouse.ie

The National Opera House (Irish: Áras Náisiúnta Ceoldrámaíochta), formerly the Wexford Opera House, is a theatre in Wexford, Ireland. It was officially opened on 5 September 2008 in a ceremony with the Taoiseach Brian Cowen, followed by a live broadcast of RTÉ's The Late Late Show from the O'Reilly Theatre.

It was built on the site of the former Theatre Royal, Wexford, which was demolished to facilitate the development. The need for a new opera house was a result of the success of the Wexford Festival Opera and the provision of a theatre, concert and conference venue in Wexford.

The Opera House consists of the 771-seat O'Reilly Theatre and the smaller Jerome Hynes Theatre, seating up to 176. It was designed and built by the architect Keith Williams Architects with the Office of Public Works.

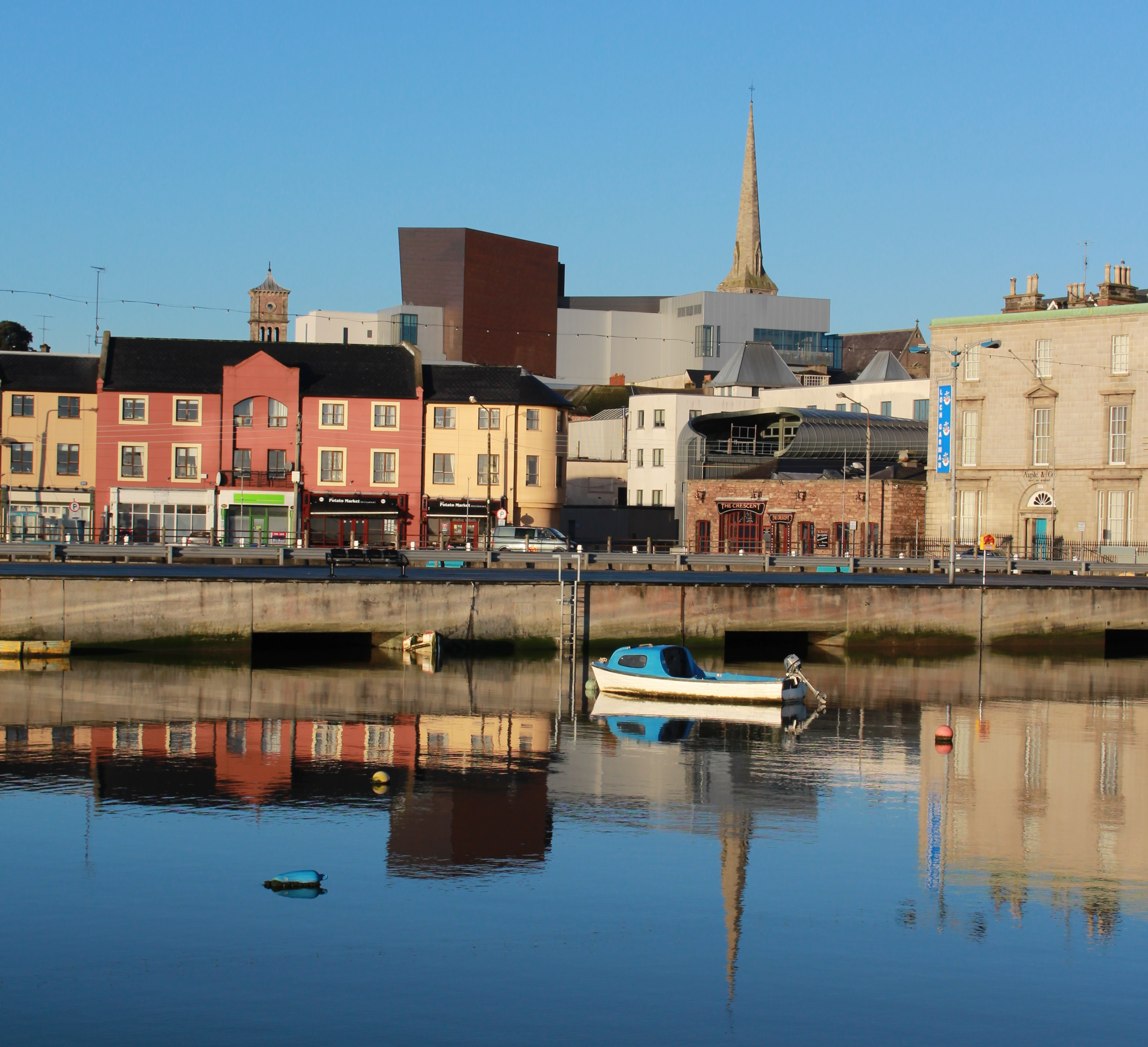
Ireland's National Opera House rises above the Wexford skyline

The Opera House was used for 2014 Sinn Féin Ard Fheis.

The building was officially renamed as Ireland's National Opera House by the Minister for Arts, Heritage, Regional, Rural and Gaeltacht Affairs, Heather Humphreys, at the opening of the 2014 Wexford Festival.
