= Albert Rosen =

Austrian-born Czech/Irish-naturalised conductor (1924–1997)

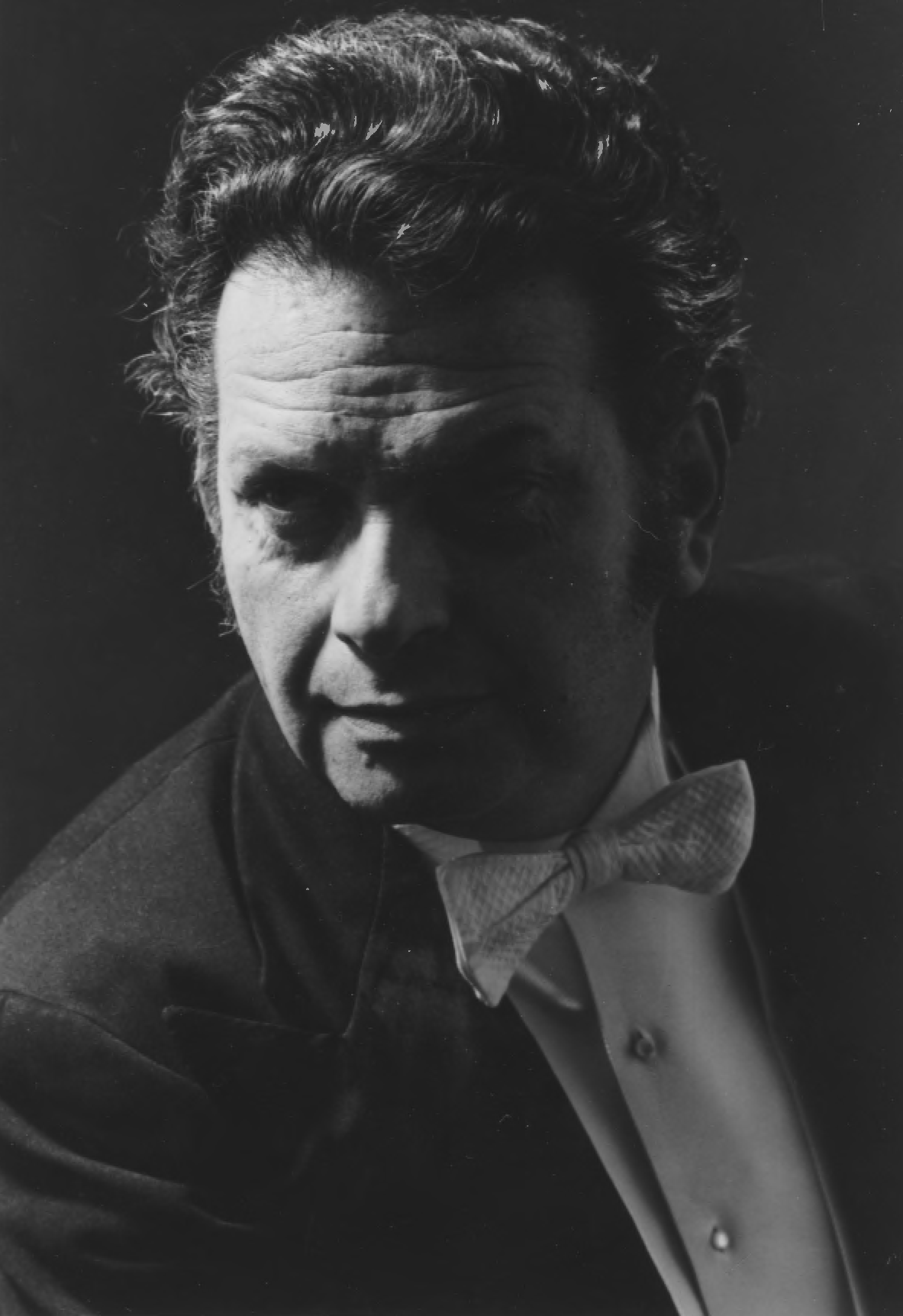
Albert Rosen

Albert Rosen (14 February 1924 – 23 May 1997) was an Austrian-born and Czech/Irish-naturalised conductor associated with the National Symphony Orchestra of Ireland, the Wexford Festival, the National Theatre in Prague and J. K. Tyl Theatre in Plzeň. He had a strong affinity with the works of Czech composers such as Smetana, Dvořák, Martinů and Janáček.

== Biography ==
Albert Rosen was born in 1924 in Vienna. His mother was Czech, while his father's family was Austrian-Jewish. After Anschluss of Austria in 1938 they moved to Bratislava, and after the Slovak version of Nuremberg Laws came to force in September 1941, he escaped discrimination and genocide via the Danube and the sea to Israel (then Mandatory Palestine). There he worked in the Shaʽar HaGolan kibbutz, manually and as an amateur chorus master, until 1945, when he returned to Bratislava.

In 1946–1947 he studied piano, composition and conducting at the Vienna Academy of Music with Joseph Marx and Hans Swarowsky, and continued to study conducting at the Prague Conservatory under Pavel Dědeček and Alois Klíma (1947–1948). He started his career in J. K. Tyl Theatre in Plzeň as a correpetiteur, assistant conductor and chorus master (1949–1952) and conductor (1953–1959), participating on the production of 11 operas, 19 ballets and, as the composer of stage music, 17 dramas. In 1960 he was engaged by National Theatre in Prague, to be appointed in 1964 the chief conductor of Smetana Theatre, the National Theatre's opera stage. He held this position until 1971, conducting 11 ballets and 9 opera productions.

In 1965 he came to Ireland for the first time to conduct the National Symphony Orchestra (under its former name, the Radio Telefís Éireann Symphony Orchestra) at the Wexford Festival. This led to his regular appearances at the festival – until 1994 he conducted 18 Wexford productions, more than anyone else. In 1969 he became the orchestra's chief conductor, until he became principal guest conductor in 1981. In 1994 he was honoured with the title Conductor Laureate of the orchestra.

His operatic repertoire included standard works such as Carmen (Bizet), Tosca and Madama Butterfly (Puccini), Il trovatore and Don Carlos (Verdi), Lohengrin (Wagner), Lucrezia Borgia (Donizetti), Otello and L'italiana in Algeri (Rossini), Káťa Kabanová (Janáček), La Wally (Catalani), The Bartered Bride (Smetana), and Salome (Richard Strauss),

He also conducted unusual works such as Smetana's The Two Widows and The Kiss, Dvořák's Rusalka, The Devil and Kate and The Jacobin, Janáček's Jenůfa, Prokofiev's The Gambler, Massenet's Don Quichotte, Peter Cornelius's Der Barbier von Bagdad, Britten's The Turn of the Screw, Franco Alfano's La leggenda di Sakùntala, Heinrich Marschner's Hans Heiling and Der Templer und die Jüdin, Engelbert Humperdinck's Königskinder, Mascagni's Il piccolo Marat, Ruggero Leoncavallo's La bohème, Giordano's La cena delle beffe, and less known operas by Martinů and Janáček.

In October 1978, in Dublin and Cork, he conducted the National Symphony Orchestra in only the second and third performances of André Tchaikowsky's 2nd Piano Concerto, Op. 4, which were the first performances with the composer as soloist (Radu Lupu had played in the world premiere in 1975 in London). He was to have recorded the work in 1982, again with Tchaikowsky at the piano, but the composer became ill and the recording was cancelled. His other work with the NSO included standard orchestral repertoire as well as major pieces such as Messiaen's Turangalîla-Symphonie and Mahler's Eighth Symphony (Symphony of a Thousand). In 1992, the orchestra toured ten cities in Germany, having a major success with Die Fledermaus in Stuttgart.

Between 1975 and 1984 he also acted as Musical Director of Limerick Choral Union.

Albert Rosen made his American debut at San Francisco Opera in 1980, in Janáček's Jenůfa. In Australia, he was chief conductor of the West Australian Symphony Orchestra from 1983 until 1985, and the Adelaide Symphony Orchestra in 1986. He conducted the British premiere of Rimsky-Korsakov's opera Christmas Eve with English National Opera in 1988. He became music director of the Irish National Opera in 1993.

He often conducted the National Youth Orchestra of Ireland during the 1990s, in challenging works such as the tone poems and An Alpine Symphony of Richard Strauss. Other opera orchestras he conducted included those of the Welsh National Opera, Scottish Opera, Vancouver Opera, San Diego Opera, and the Dublin Grand Opera Society.

He became an Irish citizen by naturalisation.

His own conducting students included John Finucane.

Albert Rosen died in Dublin on 23 May 1997, aged 73, of lung cancer.

== Discography ==
- Antonín Dvořák: The Devil and Kate. Wexford Festival Opera 1988. Kultur Video 2005 (DVD)
- Peter Racine Fricker: Symphony No. 2 Op. 14, Comedy Overture Op. 32. BBC Northern Symphony Orchestra. BBC/Lyrita 2017 (CD)
- Leoš Janáček: Jenůfa. Orchestra and Chorus of the San Francisco Opera, 1 October 1980. Gala 2004 (2 CDs)
- David Lumsdaine: Hagoromo and other orchestral works. The West Australian Symphony Orchestra, conducted by Diego Masson (1) and Albert Rosen (2–4). Australian Broadcasting Company 1991 (CD)
