= Guus Mostart =

Dutch opera director and arts administrator

- Born: 1951 (age 74–75); The Hague, Netherlands
- Occupations: Opera director, arts administrator
- Years active: 1972–present

Guus Mostart (born 1951) is a Dutch opera director and arts administrator. He was general director of the Nationale Reisopera in Enschede from 2000 to 2013.

Mostart worked at Glyndebourne Festival Opera from 1977 to 1985, latterly as director of productions of its touring company and as deputy to the artistic director. He directed two productions for Wexford Festival Opera and assisted Peter Hall on his staging of Der Ring des Nibelungen at the Bayreuth Festival.

He was director of artistic affairs of De Nederlandse Opera in Amsterdam from 1985 to 1988 and artistic director of Vancouver Opera from 1989 to 1992. From 1993 to 1999 he ran the department of artistic administration and dramaturgy at English National Opera. He directed Die Zauberflöte at the Metropolitan Opera in New York in January 1991, taking over John Cox's staging.

== Early life and training ==
Mostart was born in The Hague in 1951. He studied medicine in Amsterdam and took a course in Renaissance music at the conservatory in The Hague. By his own account he did not see an opera until he was eighteen, a performance of Offenbach's Les contes d'Hoffmann that he disliked. Singing in the chorus of Monteverdi's L'Orfeo shortly afterwards changed that, and he gave up medicine for opera.

Mostart joined the Nederlandse Operastichting as a paid supernumerary in the summer of 1972. His first appearance on stage was as a soldier in Rigoletto. He joined the company's general staff the following year, under its general director Hans de Roo, and spent a year working across all departments of the production process. A grant from the Dutch ministry of culture then took him to the London Opera Centre.

Mostart made his directing debut in 1977 with Bizet's one-act Le Docteur Miracle for the Opera Studio, the branch of the Dutch company in which young singers gained stage experience. The following year he revived the company's La traviata in the production Tito Capobianco had made for it in 1974.

== Glyndebourne, Wexford and Bayreuth ==
The 1977 Glyndebourne Festival programme lists Mostart as one of five staff producers, alongside Graham Vick among others. At the festival he worked part-time at first and full-time from 1980. The festival archive lists him as an assistant, associate and revival director. His credits there include Mozart's Die Zauberflöte (1978), Beethoven's Fidelio (1979), Britten's A Midsummer Night's Dream (1981) and Gluck's Orfeo ed Euridice (1982). A substantial part of his work consisted of preparing those productions for the tours of Glyndebourne Touring Opera, and the British press generally billed him as a producer.

Hall's 1978 production of Così fan tutte returned to the festival in 1979 in a restaging by Mostart. Hall noted in his diary that Mostart was the first director of any weight Glyndebourne had given him to restage one of his productions. He had kept faith with the original conception, Hall wrote, while developing and altering sections within it.

Mostart was director of productions of Glyndebourne Touring Opera from 1980 to 1985. The festival gave him its Carl Ebert Award in 1981, newly instituted in memory of Carl Ebert, its first artistic director. His appointment as deputy to the artistic director followed in 1984, a post described in a 1988 interview as standing in for Peter Hall.

For Wexford Festival Opera he directed a double bill of Haydn's Arianna a Naxos and L'isola disabitata in 1982 and Handel's Ariodante under Alan Curtis in 1985, both designed by John Otto. Writing in The Guardian, Tom Sutcliffe called the L'isola disabitata handsomely directed.

Between 1982 and 1984 Mostart assisted Peter Hall on his staging of Der Ring des Nibelungen at Bayreuth, which opened in 1983 under Georg Solti. Hall had three assistants, Mostart among them, who had also worked with him at Glyndebourne. de Volkskrant described him in 2009 as Hall's right hand at Bayreuth. The critic Paul Korenhof wrote in the same year that the direction of the singers was in large part owed to him.

== De Nederlandse Opera ==
The composer Jan van Vlijmen, general director of De Nederlandse Opera, announced in December 1985 that Mostart would become his closest colleague and his deputy in artistic matters. His title was director of artistic affairs. Casting was among his responsibilities.

Early in March 1988 the board announced that the post of general director would not be filled again. An artistic director would be appointed alongside the managing director Truze Lodder, and in the event of artistic disagreement final responsibility would rest with Lodder. Mostart was relieved of his duties at his own request on 7 March. He stated that the artistic course set out with Van Vlijmen was being abandoned and that quantity rather than quality was becoming the starting point. At the press conference it was said that he had earlier been given to understand that he would not become the new artistic director in Amsterdam.

Days later the Royal Concertgebouw Orchestra suspended its negotiations with the company for as long as the artistic leadership remained unsettled. Reporting the appointment of Pierre Audi as his successor in June 1988, Nieuwsblad van het Noorden wrote that both Van Vlijmen and Mostart had opposed placing the artistic and managing directorates on an equal footing. Dozens of prominent figures in Dutch musical life had supported them in this, the paper added. Mostart later described his departure to The Province as the result of an artistic dispute over funding.

== Vancouver Opera and the Metropolitan Opera ==
Mostart was appointed artistic director of Vancouver Opera in October 1988. Succeeding Brian McMaster, he took up the post with the 1989–90 season. One of his first decisions was to introduce surtitles, which his predecessor had not allowed. Outside the company he sat on the international jury of the Worldwide Madame Butterfly Competition in 1988 and 1990, at Viareggio and Miami respectively.

October 1990 brought Handel's Alcina, which he directed himself and which was the first performance of the work in Canada, conducted by Kenneth Montgomery and designed by John Otto. The company appointed Robert Hallam in July 1991 to the new post of general director, which combined the artistic and managing directorates. Mostart's contract ran to the end of the 1991–92 season. Reviewing his last production, Don Pasquale in May 1992, Michael Scott wrote that the merger had set Mostart and Hallam on an inevitable collision course. Audiences had returned to the opera during the three years of Mostart's artistic leadership, Scott added.

His debut at the Metropolitan Opera followed in January 1991, with Die Zauberflöte. The staging was John Cox's, made for Glyndebourne in 1978 and later seen in San Francisco. Mostart had worked on that original production and took it on in New York in place of Cox, who was unavailable. Sets and costumes were by David Hockney. The performance was broadcast by PBS in June 1991 and the production returned to the repertory in 1993. It was his last work as a director. He said in 2012 that he saw people around him doing it better and had therefore stopped.

== Opera Forum ==
Opera Forum in Enschede designated Mostart in May 1992 as prospective artistic director of the touring opera company that was to grow out of it. He accepted conditionally, stating at once that the sum allocated under the national arts plan would not allow him to deliver the quality he wished to stand behind. His policy plan required thirteen million guilders against the 9.7 million provided. The plan met resistance in Overijssel. The municipality of Enschede and the province wrote to the minister of culture, Hedy d'Ancona, and according to Leeuwarder Courant both were sharply critical of the ministry and of Mostart. Mostart withdrew on 26 June 1993, the news agency ANP reporting that the financial and administrative conditions had left him without sufficient confidence that his plan could be carried out.

== English National Opera ==
Mostart became director of artistic administration and dramaturgy at English National Opera with effect from 1 November 1993. The department was new and covered the choice of repertoire and the engagement of principal singers, directors, designers and dramaturges. With the general director Dennis Marks and the music director Sian Edwards he formed the company's new leadership, succeeding Peter Jonas, Mark Elder and David Pountney.

The 1994–95 season comprised eight new productions, among them the British premiere of Schnittke's Life with an Idiot and Tippett's King Priam. At the opening of that season Mostart said he wanted to bring back well-known operas that had been absent from the repertory for too long. After Marks left in 1997, Mostart and the music director Paul Daniel shared the artistic leadership until a successor was found. Mostart left the company in April 1999, after which the post lapsed.

== Nationale Reisopera ==
Mostart took over as general director of the Nationale Reisopera, the Dutch touring opera company based in Enschede, in 2000. He succeeded Louwrens Langevoort and would hold the post for twelve and a half years. The first season he assembled himself, 2001–02, opened with Fidelio under Jaap van Zweden, who made his operatic debut with it, and included the Dutch premiere of Dove's Flight. Under his direction the company gave the world premiere of Creon by Huub Kerstens and the Dutch premiere of King Priam in a staging by Antony McDonald.

From 2009 he programmed Der Ring des Nibelungen in four annual instalments, staged by Antony McDonald and conducted by Ed Spanjaard. A complete cycle was planned for 2013. The national subsidy was cut by sixty per cent in 2011, from 8.5 to 3.5 million euros, and the company had to close its own workshops and dismiss most of its staff. He told de Volkskrant that he would not have taken the job had he known how it would turn out. He handed over to Nicolas Mansfield on 1 January 2013.

== Later activities ==
Mostart sat on the jury of the first International Opera Awards in 2013, chaired by John Allison, alongside David Gockley of San Francisco Opera and Joan Matabosch of the Gran Teatre del Liceu. He is a member of the supervisory board of the Hague opera company Opera2Day.

== Awards ==
- 1981: Carl Ebert Award, Glyndebourne Festival
- 2012: Knight of the Order of Orange-Nassau, presented on 30 September by the King's Commissioner in Overijssel after the premiere of Götterdämmerung. He received the Enschede medal from mayor Peter den Oudsten the same evening
