= Rory Macdonald (conductor) =

Scottish conductor

Rory Macdonald (born 25 August 1980) is a Scottish conductor.

== Education ==
Born in Stirling, Scotland, he attended Douglas Academy in Milngavie, Glasgow, and went on to read Music at Gonville and Caius College, Cambridge University. He studied violin and piano, and began conducting aged 16. While at university he studied under David Zinman and Jorma Panula at the American Academy of Conducting in Aspen.

== Career ==
After leaving Cambridge in 2001, Macdonald spent two years working as assistant conductor to Iván Fischer and the Budapest Festival Orchestra. He made his concert debut with the orchestra in 2002. During this time Macdonald also worked as an assistant conductor at the Opéra National de Lyon and Opéra National de Paris, and studied opera coaching in Vienna.

In September 2004, Macdonald joined the Jette Parker Young Artists Programme at the Royal Opera House, Covent Garden, as a conductor. He worked on numerous productions during two seasons, notably assisting Antonio Pappano on Wagner's Ring Cycle and conducting performances of several operas including a performance of Das Rheingold in October 2007.

From January 2006 to August 2008, Macdonald held the position of assistant conductor with the Hallé Orchestra in Manchester, and music director of the Hallé Youth Orchestra. He worked closely with the orchestra's music director, Sir Mark Elder, and conducted the orchestra in over 60 concerts across the North of England.

Among the orchestras he has conducted are the Bergen Philharmonic Orchestra, Oslo Philharmonic, Royal Concertgebouw Orchestra, London Philharmonic Orchestra, BBC Philharmonic, BBC Symphony Orchestra, BBC Scottish Symphony Orchestra, BBC National Orchestra of Wales, Royal Philharmonic Orchestra, Royal Scottish National Orchestra, Bournemouth Symphony Orchestra, Lahti Symphony, Nagoya Philharmonic Orchestra, Orchestre national du Capitole de Toulouse, Royal Northern Sinfonia, Copenhagen Philharmonic, Adelaide Symphony Orchestra, Queensland Symphony Orchestra, West Australian Symphony Orchestra, Netherlands Philharmonic Orchestra, Royal Flemish Philharmonic, Staatsorchester Stuttgart, Essen Philharmonic, Bremer Philharmoniker, San Diego Symphony, Vancouver Symphony Orchestra, Prague Philharmonia, the Hague Residentie Orchestra, Filarmonica del Teatro Comunale di Bologna and the Tasmanian Symphony Orchestra. Debuts in 2021-22 include the Philharmonia Orchestra, Royal Liverpool Philharmonic Orchestra, Tokyo City Philharmonic and Nordwestdeutsche Philharmonie.

Macdonald has also built up an extensive operatic repertoire working in some of the world's leading opera houses. Following his North American debut, conducting Carmen for Canadian Opera Company in January 2010, he made his US debut that autumn at Lyric Opera of Chicago conducting a new production of A Midsummer Night's Dream. 2012 debuts in the United States included new productions of The Rape of Lucretia at Houston Grand Opera and Die Zauberflöte at San Francisco Opera. In 2012/13 he made his Wexford Festival Opera debut conducting A Village Romeo and Juliet and conducted The Cunning Little Vixen with the Bergen Philharmonic at Bergen National Opera. In 2015 he made his Royal Danish Opera debut with Die Zauberflöte and returned to Canadian Opera for Il barbiere di Siviglia. Other recent productions have included Carmen with Houston Grand Opera, Santa Fe Opera and Teatro Nacional de São Carlos, Lisbon, The Turn of the Screw at the Konzerthaus, Vienna, Ariadne auf Naxos at Opera Theatre of Saint Louis, and a reinvitation to Lyric Opera of Chicago for Die Zauberflöte, a new production of Auber's Fra Diavolo at Teatro dell'Opera di Roma, Così fan tutte and Le Nozze di Figaro at Oper Frankfurt and Le Nozze di Figaro at Gothenburg Opera. At the 2018 Brisbane Festival he conducted Peter Grimes with Stuart Skelton in the title role and at the 2020 Adelaide Festival he conducted Romeo Castellucci's radical stage production of the Mozart Requiem. In 2022 he returned to Opera Theatre of St Louis for Die Zauberflote and in the Autumn to Glyndebourne for La Boheme. He will conduct Il Barbiere di Siviglia at the Glyndebourne Festival in summer 2025.

At the Royal Opera House in London he has conducted Il barbiere di Siviglia, Hänsel und Gretel, Fidelio, Das Rheingold, Owen Wingrave, A Midsummer Night's Dream and Orphée (Philip Glass). With English National Opera he has conducted The Barber of Seville, The Pearl Fishers and The Elixir of Love. In 2003 Macdonald made his Glyndebourne debut at very short notice with Idomeneo. Also at Glyndebourne he has conducted Così fan tutte and Albert Herring for the autumn tour.

Other opera work has included L'elisir d'amore (Welsh National Opera), The Abduction from the Seraglio (Opera North) La bohème (Danish National Opera, RTÉ NSO), La fanciulla del West (Grange Park Opera), and Don Giovanni (Magdeburg Opera).
