= La tempesta (opera) =

Italian Opera

La tempesta is an Italian-language opera composed by Fromental Halévy with a libretto by Eugène Scribe based on William Shakespeare’s The Tempest. The opera, commissioned by Benjamin Lumley for the Italian opera in London, premiered at Her Majesty's Theatre on 8 June 1850 with Filippo Coletti as Prospero, Henrietta Sontag as Miranda, Carlotta Grisi as Ariel, and Luigi Lablanche as Caliban.

Eugène Scribe's libretto was translated into Italian, since operas were rarely performed in languages other than Italian in 19th-century London.

Felix Mendelssohn had been originally commissioned to compose the score, but, according to Henry Chorley, he ‟positively rejected the book as written by M. Scribe, and had declined to compose it until it was wholly remodeled”.

The opera was revived at the Wexford Opera Festival in 2022.
