= Maria (opera) =

Maria is a three-act Polish-language opera, premiered in 1906, by Roman Statkowski on a libretto based on Antoni Malczewski’s 1825 epic poem of the same name. The opera is set in 17th-century Ukraine. It was performed at the Wexford Festival in 2011.

== Recordings ==
- Maria, complete studio recording conducted by Łukasz Borowicz, 2008
