= Keith Williams (architect) =

British architect

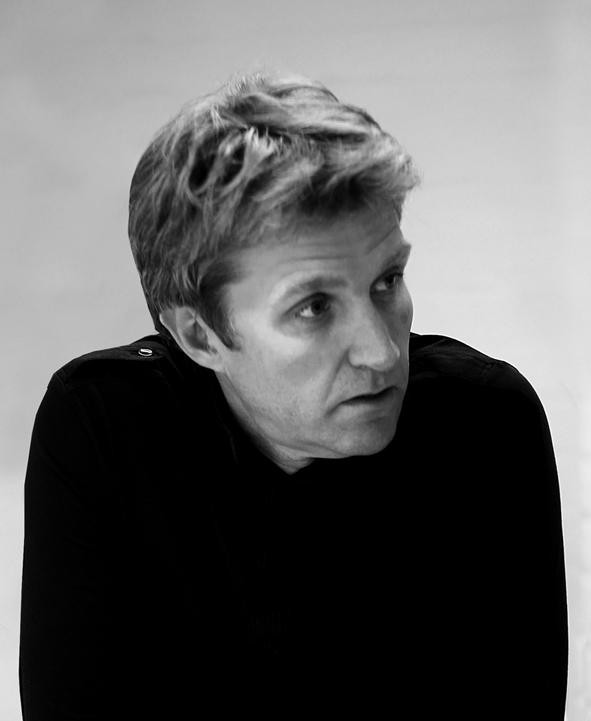
- Born: 21 April 1958 (age 68)
- Education: Kingston University School of Architecture, University of Greenwich School of Architecture
- Occupation: Architect
- Spouse: Vanessa Shrimpton
- Practice: Keith Williams Architects
- Website: Official website

Keith Williams FRIBA MRIAI FRSA (born 21 April 1958) is a British architect and founder of London-based Keith Williams Architects.

== Education and career ==
Keith Williams was born in Kent. His father was an electrical design engineer chiefly working on the upgrade of the National Grid and latterly in the North Sea oil industry, whilst his mother was a librarian. His younger brother Martin is also an architect. When he was 5 years old, the family moved to Surrey. Keith was then educated at Kingston Grammar School before going on to study architecture at Kingston and then Greenwich Schools of Architecture.

In 1984, he became a chartered architect and was elected to the Royal Institute of British Architects. He worked for Sheppard Robson and then Sir Terry Farrell at Farrells, before co-founding Pawson Williams Architects in 1987 with fellow architect Terry Pawson, whom he had known since student days at Kingston.

In 2001 he split from Pawson and established his own independent architectural firm, Keith Williams Architects operating as its founder and director of design.At the same time, he invited his longstanding collaborator and former student, the architect Richard Brown to become a director.

He became a member of the Royal Institute of the Architects of Ireland in 2005 and a fellow of the Royal Society of Arts in 2007.

In 2011, he joined the National Panel of the Civic Trust Awards operating as its Chair from 2015 until ending his tenure in 2023. Since 2023 he has been a jury member for the Architecture Today Awards.

He chaired the Lewisham Design Review Panel, from 2014 to 2025, and has operated as a Panel Chair for Design South East since 2013.

In 2016 he was elected as a Fellow of the Royal Institute of British Architects.

He became Chair of the Board of Trustees of charity Docomomo UK in 2024.

National Life Stories conducted an oral history interview (C467/136) with Keith Williams in 2017-2019 for its Architects' Lives collection.

== Selected buildings ==
- 2024 DeValera Library & Súil Art Gallery Ennis Co Clare Ireland
- 2012 The Novium, Chichester
- 2012 Luan Gallery, Athlone
- 2011 Marlowe Theatre, Canterbury
- 2008 Wexford Opera House
- 2008 Clones Library & County Library HQ Co Monaghan Ireland
- 2005 Unicorn Theatre, London
- 2005 The Long House, London
- 2004 Athlone Civic Centre, Athlone Co. Westmeath Ireland

== Bibliography ==
2009, Keith Williams: Architecture of the Specific, Image Publishing, Mulgrave. ISBN 978-1-86470-235-4

== Awards ==
- 2014 Civic Trust Award for the Luan Gallery, Athlone
