= The Cherub Company London =

The Cherub Company London was an English theatre company, founded by Andrew Visnevski and Simon Chandler in 1978 as an ensemble of young actors, designers and composers introducing rare classics and continental plays to the stage in a style that proved unconventional and brilliantly visual. In its first twenty-five years it produced thirty plays, toured nine times in the UK, and visited twelve counties on three continents.

Notable productions include: Kafka's THE TRIAL (1980) with Tom Hunsinger, Isabella Knight, Anthony Wise, David Acton, Paul Hegarty and (2002), with Rebecca Whiteman, Colin Adrian, Alexander Falkowski, William Wollen, Svein Solenes; Ten Days’ A-Maze by Jan Potocki (1997) with Rebecca Over, Jane Backlog, Christopher Gunning, Russell Kennedy, Ian Harris, Phil Dix; The Tempest (1996), with Rebecca Over, Russell Kennedy, Adam Goodwin, Jeff Lewis, Christopher Gunning, Christian Greger, Ian Harris and Andrew Novell,.
