= Tempesta (surname) =

Tempesta is an Italian surname. Notable people with the surname include:

- Antonio Tempesta (1555–1630), Italian painter and engraver,
- Cavalier Pietro Tempesta (Pieter Mulier II) (1637–1701), Dutch-Italian landscape painter
- John Tempesta (born 1964), American drummer
- Mike Tempesta, rock guitarist
- Bonnie Lynn Tempesta (1953–2014), baker
- Orani João Tempesta (born 1950), Archbishop of Rio de Janeiro
- Count Peter Tempesta (1291–1315), Count of Eboli
