= John Stoddart (stage designer) =

Australian opera stage designer

- Born: 1937 (age 87–88); Sydney, Australia
- Occupation: Opera stage designer

John Stoddart (born 1937) is an Australian opera stage designer. Born in Sydney, he began his career as an architect. On his first British commission in 1967, he designed the stage for Anthony Besch's production of Così fan tutte at the Scottish Opera, where he continued to work. In 2000 he collaborated with John Cox to stage Capriccio at the Sydney Opera House during the 2000 Summer Olympics. Aside from Capriccio, with Opera Australia he has designed the sets for The Magic Flute, Ariadne auf Naxos, Patience, The Beggar's Opera, Die Fledermaus, Les Huguenots, Don Carlos, A Streetcar Named Desire, Of Mice and Men, and Die tote Stadt.
