= Andrew Synnott =

Irish composer and conductor

- Born: 1970 (age 55–56); Duleek, Ireland
- Occupation: Composer
- Website: andrewsynnott.com

Andrew Synnott is an Irish composer and conductor. In 1997, he co-founded Crash Ensemble, a contemporary music group. In 2017, he became the first living Irish composer to have an opera staged at the Wexford Festival Opera with the premiere of Dubliners. Wexford commissioned three further operas from him: La cucina, premiered at the festival in 2019, What Happened To Lucrece (2020) and The Forty-Seventh Saturday (2021).

== Conducting ==
Synnott is an active conductor. In 2018, he conducted from the piano his own reduction of The Tales of Hoffmann for Irish National Opera. He has conducted many opera performances in Ireland and abroad, and has worked with leading ensembles including the National Symphony Orchestra of Ireland, the RTÉ Concert Orchestra and the National Chamber Choir of Ireland.

== Works ==
- Dubliners (2017), libretto by Arthur Riordan based on Joyce's short stories "Counterparts" and "The Boarding House"
- La Cucina (2018), premiered at Wexford Opera Festival.
- What Happened to Lucrese (2020)
- Asylum (2020)
- Waiting for Elvira (2021)
- The Forty-Seventh Saturday (2021)
- I Follow, I Follow... (2022)
