= Stefan Janski =

British opera director

Stefan Janski is an opera director. He was the co-producer and librettist for the Sadler's Wells Theatre production of The Snowman of Kashmir in 1974, and has served as Associate Director with Glyndebourne Festival Opera and its Touring Opera, as well as staff director for English National Opera. He is Director of Opera Studies at the Royal Northern College of Music, which he joined in 1986. He has also worked freelance for notable companies such as Scottish Opera, Los Angeles Opera and the Royal Ballet of Flanders. He received significant acclaim for his production of Handel's Xerxes.
