= Bryan Balkwill =

English conductor (1922 – 2007)

Bryan Havell Balkwill (2 July 1922 – 24 February 2007) was an English orchestral conductor.

Balkwill was born in London. He started to learn to play the piano at the age of four and was educated at Merchant Taylors' School. From there he won a scholarship to the Royal Academy of Music. After service in the Second World War in Italy he was appointed as répétiteur for the New London Opera Company in 1947 where he became its assistant conductor. With them he made his debut at the Cambridge Theatre conducting Carl Ebert's production of Rigoletto. Around the same time he was the associate conductor of the International Ballet Company.

In 1950 he became répétiteur at Glyndebourne Festival Opera and during the same year was appointed as principal conductor of the London Festival Ballet. He returned to Glyndebourne in 1953 as chorus master and associate conductor. During the 1950s he played a part in creating the Art Council's Opera for All programme and was its musical director from 1953 to 1963. Also during the 1950s he was principal conductor of the Wexford Festival for seven years. He made his debut at the Royal Festival Hall in 1957 conducting the Royal Philharmonic Orchestra.

In 1959 he was appointed a resident conductor at the Royal Opera House, Covent Garden and he remained there until 1965, during which time he gave more than 200 performances of 16 operas. He toured with the English Opera Group to the USSR and Portugal where he conducted Albert Herring and A Midsummer Night's Dream. From 1963 to 1967 he succeeded Charles Groves as music director of the Welsh National Opera. He was also the joint musical director of the Sadler's Wells Opera from 1966 to 1969. Here he gave the first performance of Richard Rodney Bennett's opera A Penny for a Song.

After this he went freelance, conducting the BBC orchestras, the Orchestre National de France and in Montreal, Edmonton and Vancouver. From 1979 to 1992 he was professor at the School of Music at Indiana University. He retired in 1992 and returned to Britain.

During his career he became particularly associated with the performances of Joan Sutherland, including conducting her at Covent Garden in Alcina, La sonnambula and, in her most celebrated role, Lucia di Lammermoor. He also conducted Peter Pears in Peter Grimes, Jon Vickers in Aida and Régine Crespin in Tosca.

Cultural offices
Preceded by Colin Davis	Co-Music Director, Sadler's Wells; 1966–1969	Succeeded by Charles Mackerras
