= Roman Statkowski =

Polish composer (1859–1925)

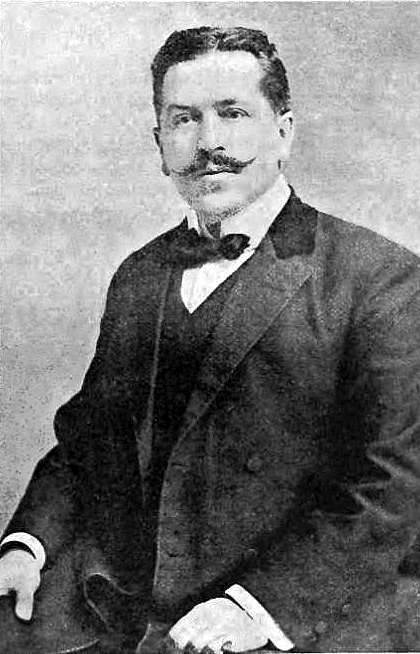
Roman Statkowski

Roman Statkowski (24 December 1859 – 12 November 1925) was a Polish composer, most notable for his operas and chamber music.

== Early life ==
Statkowski was born in Szczypiorno, near Kalisz, and initially trained as a lawyer. When he deserted the law for a musical career, he studied with Władysław Żeleński in Warsaw and then at the Saint Petersburg Conservatory with Nikolai Soloviev and Anton Rubinstein, graduating at the age of 31 in 1890.

== Musical influences ==
His musical influences were mainly Russian, specifically Mussorgsky and Tchaikovsky, but he was also attracted to German music such as the tone poems of Richard Strauss and the operas of Hans Pfitzner. His work has been described as linking the post-Moniuszko composers and the generation of Szymanowski.

== Operas ==
Statkowski's two operas were Philaenis (or Filenis) (1897, first performed in 1904) and Maria (1903-4, first performed in 1906). The latter is based on a novel of the same name by Antoni Malczewski. It has achieved some popularity in its native country and has been performed in various Polish cities between 1919 and 1965. It was staged by Wexford Festival Opera in late 2011.

== Other compositions ==
These include a set of piano Preludes (op. 37) and a Krakowiak for violin and piano, as well as six string quartets and a number of songs.

== Later life ==
In 1909, Statkowski was appointed to succeed Zygmunt Noskowski as professor of composition at the Warsaw Conservatory. His pupils there included Jan Maklakiewicz, Piotr Perkowski, Apolinary Szeluto, Boleslaw Szabelski and Victor Young. See: List of music students by teacher: R to S#Roman Statkowski. He died in Warsaw in 1925.

== Discography ==
- 2005 : Piano Works vol. 1 - Acte Préalable AP0126
- 2008 : Piano Works vol. 2 - Acte Préalable AP0176
