= La Cucina (band) =

La Cucina was an English roots style band of the 1990s, that went under the tagline of "accordion-driven funky neapolitan rockers". Although they were based in the south of England, their music was an amalgam of Southern Italian folk songs and disco and salsa beats. They were famed at the time for their wild concerts, and lack of wild living - on arrival in a new town, two members of the band would head for the local library.

They brought out a series of cassettes, in which they explored Neapolitan music. Later, they produced 3 CDs in which the instrumentation and production is of a much more contemporary nature, with influences such as Tom Waits and Madness. They played throughout the United Kingdom, as well as France, Spain, Germany and Italy.

In 1996 they visited Jordan to play at the wedding of one of the granddaughters of King Hussein. This featured the new band members on the CD Bloom.

Their third CD, Bloom, completed after the departure of Owain Clarke and the introduction of the songwriting partnership of Paul Goodall and Tom Hazell also contained several collaborations with Najma Akhtar.

== Discography ==
- La Luna Spinosa (cassette) (1989)
- Morte Accidentale De Musiciste (cassette) (1990)
- Kemado (cassette) (1992)
- Chucheria (CD) (1994)
- Nabumla! (CD) (1996)
- Bloom (CD) (1997)

== Personnel ==
- Eliseo D'Agostino; accordion
- Owain Clarke; guitar and vocals
- Dylan Clarke; double bass
- Scott Tobin; Drums and percussion
- Roberto Stocchiverdi; congas

La Cucina 1996 and the album Bloom

- Eliseo D'Agostino; accordion
- Dylan Clarke; double bass
- Scott Tobin; Drums and percussion
- Roberto Stocchiverdi; congas
- Paul Goodall; vocals and guitar
- Tom Hazell; guitar
