= Il maestro di cappella =

- Operatic intermezzo by Domenico Cimarosa
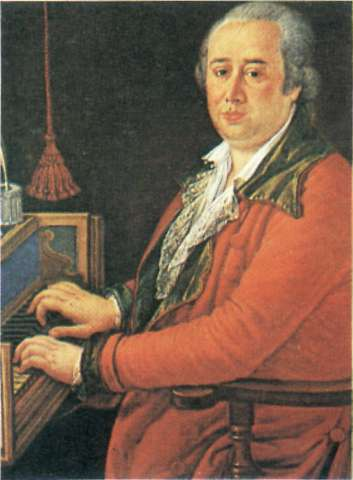
- The composer
- Language: Italian
- Premiere: 2 July 1793; Berlin

Il maestro di cappella is an operatic intermezzo in one act by Domenico Cimarosa. (Though often translated in English as The Music Teacher, the Italian term maestro di cappella is the equivalent of the German kapellmeister — "master of the choir or orchestra".) The first known performance of the work was on 2 July 1793 in Berlin, Germany. However, it is likely that this was not the premier production, and music historians believe the opera debuted some time between 1786 and 1792. The author of the opera's libretto is now unknown.

An amusing monodrama for a bass-baritone, the opera portrays a pompous maestro rehearsing an orchestra, often imitating the sound of the instruments. Always popular with great buffos (such as Fernando Corena and Sesto Bruscantini), it continues to be regularly performed. A typical performance runs slightly under 20 minutes.

The only extant complete version of this work, according to Marco Brolli, is a vocal score for bass-baritone and piano that was published in 1810 in Leipzig. For this reason, the versions heard today require completion and orchestration by an editor. The 1960 Fernando Corena recording gives a version "revised and orchestrated by Maffeo Zanon" (1882-1968), while the more recent recording with Il Giardino Armonico uses Brolli's critical edition and orchestration.
