= Vancouver Opera =

Canadian opera company

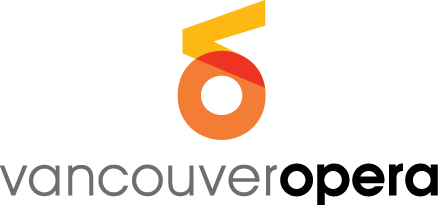
- Type: Incentive
- Founded: 1958
- Revenue: 6,658,635 Canadian dollar (2003)
- Total assets: 2,365,846 Canadian dollar (2003)
- Number of employees: 133 (2003)

Vancouver Opera is the second largest performing arts organization in British Columbia and the largest opera company in western Canada. Its mainstage performances occur in the Queen Elizabeth Theatre, other venues in Vancouver and occasionally elsewhere in British Columbia. Vancouver Opera has one of only two professional opera orchestras in Canada (the other being Toronto's Canadian Opera Company). After many regular seasons with four mainstage productions a year, the company saw its first festival season in 2017. Vancouver Opera also runs a school touring and education program, and various community events.

== History ==
Vancouver Opera was founded in 1958 by William Morton and presented its first production in 1960. From its inception until 1974, and for two seasons from 1982 to 1984, the company was headed by Artistic Director Irving Guttman.

The company has presented five world premières: The Architect (McIntyre and Cone), Naomi's Road (Luengen and Hodges), Jack Pine (Hille), Lillian Alling (Estacio and Murrell), and Stickboy (Weisensel and Koyzcan). It produced the Canadian première of John Adams's Nixon in China (2010) and Tan Dun's Tea: A Mirror of Soul (2013).

Conductor Richard Bonynge served as Artistic Director from 1974 to 1982, and he was the founding Music Director of the Vancouver Opera Orchestra, one of only two opera orchestras in Canada, in the moment of its creation in 1977 (prior to 1977, opera productions were played by and orchestra made up of members of Vancouver Symphony Orchestra). In 1984, Brian McMaster began a five-year tenure. He was followed by Guus Mostart for three seasons (1989–90, 1990–91 and 1991–92), and by Robert Hallam, who in 1991 was appointed to the new position of General Director.

The company's current General Director, Tom Wright, assumed the position in November 2019 as Interim General Director, and was confirmed as General Director in April 2020. In 2018, Vancouver Opera named conductor Jonathan Darlington as Music Director Emeritus after leading the company's musical forces since 2002. In 2023, the company announced the appointment of French-Canadian conductor Jacques Lacombe as their next music director, starting his tenure in the 2024/2025 season.
