= Wexford Festival Opera =

Opera festival in Ireland

Coordinates: 52.338193°N 6.462798°W

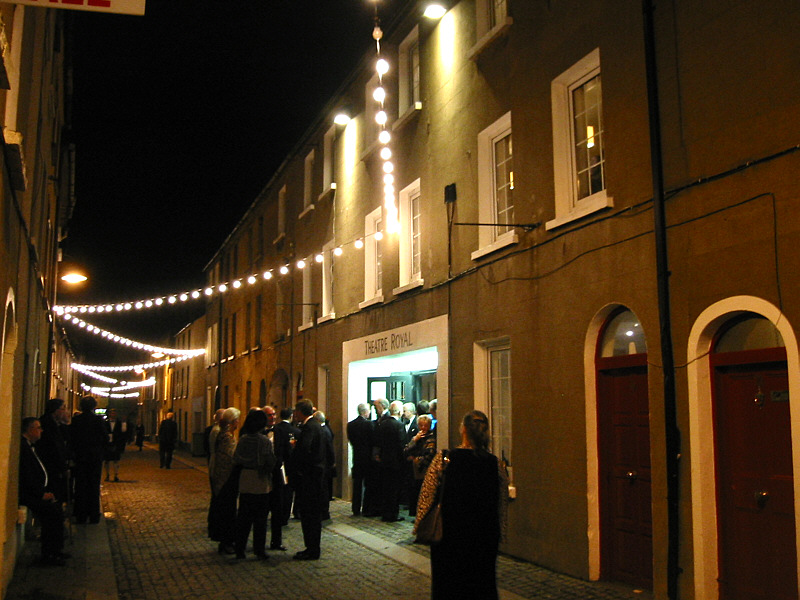
Theatre Royal during the opera festival

Wexford Festival Opera (Irish: Féile Ceoldráma Loch Garman) is an opera festival that takes place in the town of Wexford in south-eastern Ireland during the months of October and November. Originally primarily held in Wexford's Theatre Royal, the festival has been based at the National Opera House since 2008.

== History ==
=== Origins, 1951 to 1966 ===
Tom Walsh, an avid opera lover, dreamt of staging an opera production in his hometown Wexford. He started the Wexford Opera Study Circle in 1950, and invited Sir Compton Mackenzie, the founder of the magazine The Gramophone and a writer on music, for the inaugural lecture for the circle. Mackenzie and Walsh discussed the idea of a local opera festival, and Mackenzie became the first President of the Wexford Festival of Music and the Arts.

The result was that a group of opera lovers (including Walsh became the festival's first artistic director) planned a "Festival of Music and the Arts" (as the event was first called) from 21 October to 4 November 1951. The highlight was a production of the 19t-century Irish composer Michael William Balfe's 1857 The Rose of Castille, a little-known opera whose composer had lived in Wexford.

During its first decade, the Wexford festival offered a program of less-known operas including Lortzing's Der Wildschütz and Bellini's La sonnambula. Bryan Balkwill, Charles Mackerras and John Pritchard were among the festival's conductors, working with producers and designers like Michael MacLiammoir. The organisers recruited singers like Nicola Monti, Afro Poli and Franco Calabrese as well as rising British and Irish performers like Heather Harper, Bernadette Greevy, Thomas Hemsley and Geraint Evans.

Due to the renovation of the theatre in Wexford, the 1960 season did not take place, but at its re-opening, Verdi's Ernani was presented in September 1961. Problems in obtaining the Radio Éireann Light Orchestra (now the RTÉ Concert Orchestra) led to the involvement of the Royal Liverpool Philharmonic for that season.

In the following year, 1962, the Radio Éireann Symphony (now the RTÉ National Symphony Orchestra) moved into the pit, a role it maintained up until 2005. In 1962, L'amico Fritz brought the young Irish singers Veronica Dunne and Bernadette Greevy to international notice, while other names from the 1960s included Mirella Freni in Bellini's I puritani. Massenet's Don Quichotte was staged at the 1965 festival, with the veteran bass Miroslav Cangalovic as Cervantes' old knight.

=== 1960s and 1970s ===
Albert Rosen, a young conductor from Prague, began a long association with the company in 1965, and he went on to conduct 18 Wexford productions. He was later appointed principal conductor of the RTÉ Symphony Orchestra and was conductor laureate at the time of his death in 1997.

In 1967, Walter Legge, the EMI recording producer and founder of the Philharmonia Orchestra was asked to take over the running of the festival, but within a month of the appointment he suffered a severe heart attack and was obliged to withdraw. The 26-year-old former Trinity College student Brian Dickie took over the running of the festival. The first operas staged in this period included Russian and Czech operates, with a new emphasis on the French repertory as represented by Delibes’ Lakmé in 1970 and Bizet's Les pêcheurs de perles in 1971.

Dickie was persuaded to return to Glyndebourne, and his successor in 1974 was Thomson Smillie who came from the Scottish Opera. Smillie maintained the three-opera format. Massenet's operas became his favourites, and Smillie staged Thaïs in his first season, starting a series of the composer's operas which included the rare Sapho produced in 2001. In 1976, Britten's The Turn of the Screw was presented along with a rarity in Cimarosa's one-man piece Il maestro di cappella. Other lesser-known Italian operas of the 18th century were presented in 1979 and subsequent years.

=== 1980s and early 1990s ===
Adrian Slack, who took over the running of the festival in 1979, concentrated on mainly Italian opera. There were some exception such as Handel's Orlando, Floyd's Of Mice and Men and Mozart's Zaide. During Spontini's La vestale there was an incident in which the entire company slipping on a steeply raked, smoothly finished stage, as described by Bernard Levin.

Elaine Padmore took over from Slack in 1982. Padmore had been a BBC opera producer and had supervised transmissions of the productions for BBC Radio 3. Padmore introduced audiences to the works of Sergei Leiferkus. Other newcomers, such as the American dramatic soprano Alessandra Marc, were involved during Padmore's tenure at the festival. Other productions included newcomer Francesca Zambello's two productions, the first of Donizetti's L'assedio di Calais in 1991 and Tchaikovsky's Cherevichki in 1993. One of the ideas introduced by Padmore in 1982 was the "Operatic Scenes", the presentation of excerpts from operas. This provided a lower-cost alternative for younger audience members as well as offering more work to the chorus, and the idea proved to be very successful.

Michael William Balfe's The Rose of Castile, directed by Nicolette Molnár and designed by John Lloyd Davies, was revived in a professional production in early 1991 to commemorate the festival's 40th anniversary.

=== 1995 to 2004 ===
In 1995, Padmore was succeeded as artistic director by Luigi Ferrari, then director of the Rossini Opera Festival at Pesaro and later director of the Teatro Comunale in Bologna. He developed his own style by emphasising Italian and late Romantic works such as Meyerbeer's L'étoile du nord in 1996.

In 1994, a four-year series of commercial recordings from the festival was started, in addition to Raidió Teilifís Éireann broadcasts from the festival. Several seasons were also broadcast by BBC Radio 3. In 2001, the fiftieth festival was a special event marked by the introduction of surtitles.

=== 2005 onwards ===
David Agler became artistic director and programmed the 2005 and subsequent seasons. Agler is an American conductor, previously the music director at Vancouver Opera and resident conductor at the San Francisco Opera. One innovation from Agler, following up from the original idea of "Operatic Scenes", has been the "mini opera" concept, presenting the more mainstream works in condensed versions.

In 2020, Agler was succeeded as artistic director by Rosetta Cucchi.

== Expansion ==
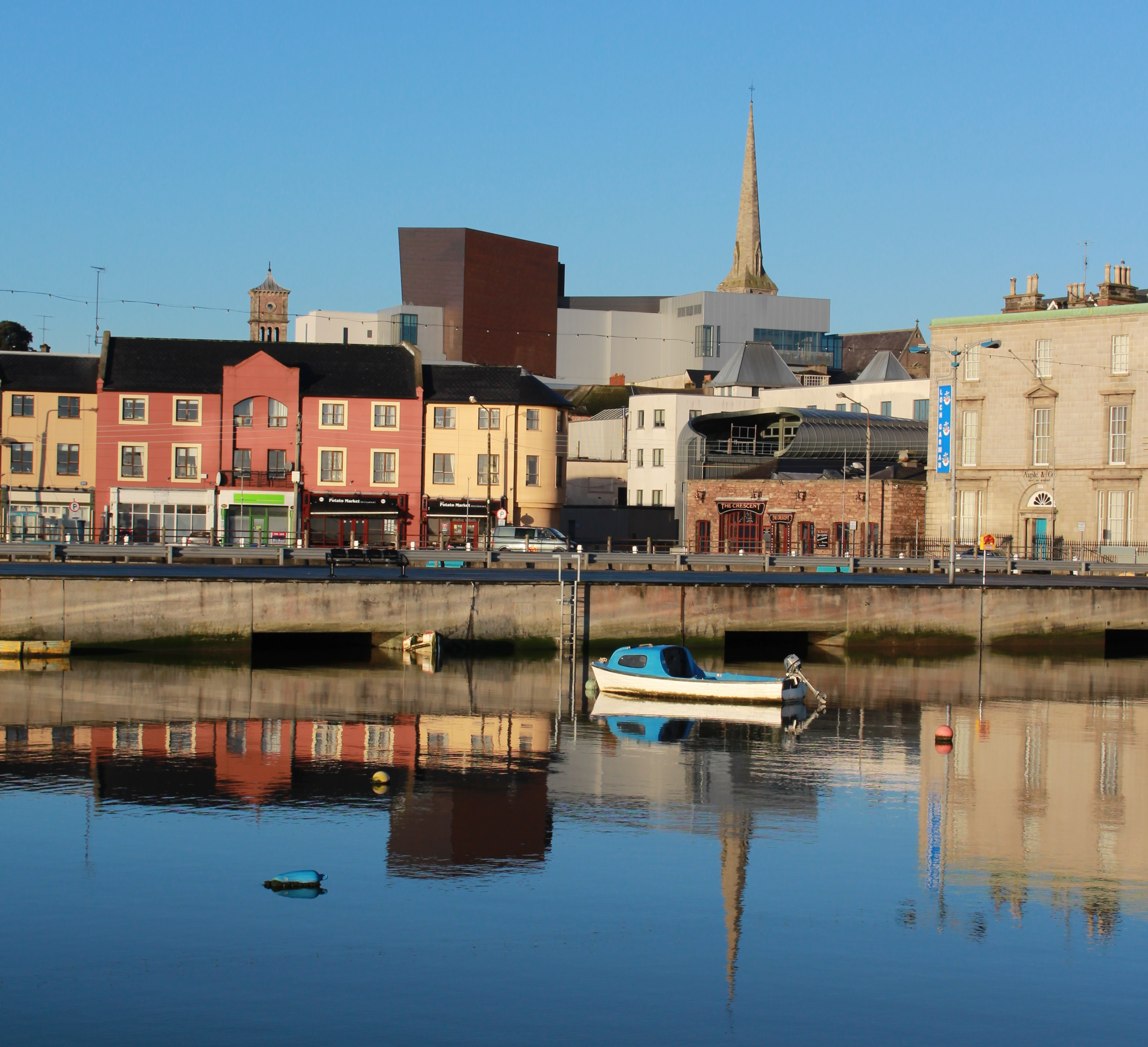
The new theatre rises over the old Wexford skyline

The festival's home of so many years, the Theatre Royal, was demolished in early 2006 and replaced by the National Opera House on the same site. The first opera in the new building opened on 16 October 2008.

Wexford Opera House provided the festival with additional in capacity in the 771-seat O'Reilly Theatre and the second Jerome Hynes Theatre, with a seating capacity up to 176. The architect was Keith Williams Architects with the Office of Public Works; the acoustics and structure were designed by Arup.

In 2006, because of the closure of the Theatre Royal, a reduced festival took place in the Dún Mhuire Hall on Wexford's South Main Street. Only two operas were staged over a period of two weeks, instead of the usual three operas over three weeks. In 2007, the festival took place in the summer in a temporary theatre in the grounds of Johnstown Castle, a stately home roughly 5 km from the town centre.

The National Opera House was officially opened on 5 September 2008 in a ceremony with the Taoiseach Brian Cowen, followed by a live broadcast of RTÉ's The Late Late Show from the O'Reilly Theatre.

== See also ==
- List of operas performed at the Wexford Festival.
- List of opera festivals

== Bibliography ==
- Wexford Festival Programmes (Wexford: Wexford Festival Trust, 1951 ff.)
- Smith, Gus: Ring up the Curtain! (Dublin: Celtic Publishers, 1976)
- Levin, Bernard: Conducted Tour (London: Jonathan Cape, 1982) (an overview of 12 favourite music festivals, including Wexford)
- Fox, Ian: 100 Nights at the Opera. An Anthology to Celebrate the 40th anniversary of the Wexford Festival Opera (Dublin: Town House and Country House, 1991); ISBN 0-948524-32-4
- Smith, Gus: Dr Tom's Festival Legacy (Dublin & London: Atlantic Publishers, 2001)
- Daly, Karina, Tom Walsh's Opera: The History of the Wexford Festival, 1951–2004 (Dublin: Four Courts Press, 2004); ISBN 1-85182-878-8
- Lewis, Kevin: What the Doctor Ordered: An Encyclopaedia of the Wexford Festival Opera Since 1951 (Dublin: Nonsuch Publishing, 2008); ISBN 978-1-84588-597-7
