= Uranian =

Uranian may refer to:

== Sexuality ==
- Uranian (sexuality), a historical term for homosexual men
- Uranians, a group of male homosexual poets

== Astronomy ==
- Uranian, of or pertaining to the planet Uranus
- Uranian system, refers to the 27 moons of Uranus

== Mythology and fiction ==
- Uranian, relating to Aphrodite Urania, an epithet of the Greek goddess Aphrodite
- Uranian, relating to Urania, the muse of astronomy
- Uranian (comics), a fictional race in the Marvel Universe

== Other uses ==
- Uranian Phalanstery, artist collectives in New York City
- For Uranian astrology see Hamburg School of Astrology

== See also ==
- Urania (disambiguation)
- Uranus (disambiguation)
