= Urania (disambiguation) =

Urania is a muse in Greek mythology.

Urania may also refer to:

== Other mythology ==
- Aphrodite Urania, a title for the Greek goddess Aphrodite, as opposed to Aphrodite Pandemos
- Urania, an Oceanid
- Urania, one of the female dogs of the hunter Actaeon. Like the rest of the pack, she also devoured her master when he was transformed into a stag by Artemis, goddess of the hunt.

== Awards ==
- Urania Award, an Italian science fiction award
- Urania Awards (film), a set of awards given at the Let's CEE Film Festival in Vienna, Austria (2012-2018)

== People ==
- Urania Marquard Olsen (1856–1932), Danish-Norwegian actress and theatre director
- Urania Papatheu (born 1965), Italian politician
- Julia Urania, wife of Roman client King Ptolemy of Mauretania

== Places ==
- Urânia, a city in the state of São Paulo, Brazil
- Urania, Louisiana, a town in the United States
- Urania, Michigan, a former community
- Urania, South Australia, a locality in the Yorke Peninsula Council

== Publications ==
=== Magazines and journals ===
- Urania, a German science magazine published by Gesellschaft zur Verbreitung wissenschaftlicher Kenntnisse
- Urania (journal), a genderqueer feminist journal circulated between 1916 and 1940
- Urania (magazine), a number of science fiction magazines
- Urania - Postępy Astronomii, a Polish popular science magazine

=== Literature ===
- The Countess of Montgomery's Urania (1621), a work by Lady Mary Wroth
- Urania (original title Uranie), 1889 work by Camille Flammarion
- Urania, a poem by Samuel Austin

== Science ==
=== Buildings ===
- Hala Urania, an indoor arena in Olsztyn, Poland
- Urania (Berlin), the first science center in the world, founded in Berlin in 1888
- Urania (Vienna), an observatory
- Urania Sternwarte, an observatory in Zurich
- Urania Hungarian Scientific Theatre, predecessor of the Urania National Film Theatre in Budapest, Hungary

=== Other ===
- 30 Urania, an asteroid
- Unified Reduced Non-Inductive Assessment (URANIA), an upgrade to Pegasus Toroidal Experiment
- Urania (moth), a moth genus in subfamily Uraniinae
- Urania, a synonym for a genus of plants, Ravenala
- Uranium dioxide, or urania, or uranic oxide
- Yellowcake, also called urania, concentrated uranium ore

== Other uses ==
- Italian ship Urania, several ships of that name
- Urania Genève Sport, a Swiss football club
- Urania Records, an American classical and jazz record label founded in 1951
- Uranian (sexology), a 19th-century term that referred to a person of a third sex

== See also ==
- Uraniborg, dedicated to Urania, the first observatory in modern Europe built 1576–1580
- Ourania (disambiguation)
- Uranus (disambiguation)
- The Urantia Book, a spiritual and religious book
