= Uran (disambiguation) =

Uran is a town in India.

Uran may also refer to:

== Places ==
- Uran Togoo - Tulga Uul Natural Monument, Mongolia

=== India ===
- Uran taluka, Maharashtra
- Nerul–Uran line (Mumbai Suburban Railway)
- Uran (Vidhan Sabha constituency)
- Uran railway station
- Uran Gas Turbine Power Station, Uran city

== People ==
- Uran (name)
- Rigoberto Urán Urán, a Colombian professional road racing cyclist
- Uran (character), the Astro Boy character

== Military ==
- Kh-35 Uran, anti-ship missile
- Uran-9, a Russian tracked unmanned combat ground vehicle

== Other ==
- URAN, Ukrainian Radio Interferometer of the National Academy of Sciences of Ukraine
- Uran Khatola, a fictional flying vehicle in the traditional folktales of North India and Pakistan
- Uran Khatola (film), a 1955 Hindi film

== See also ==
- Uranium (disambiguation)
- Uranus (disambiguation)
