= Phalanstère =

Type of building for utopian communes

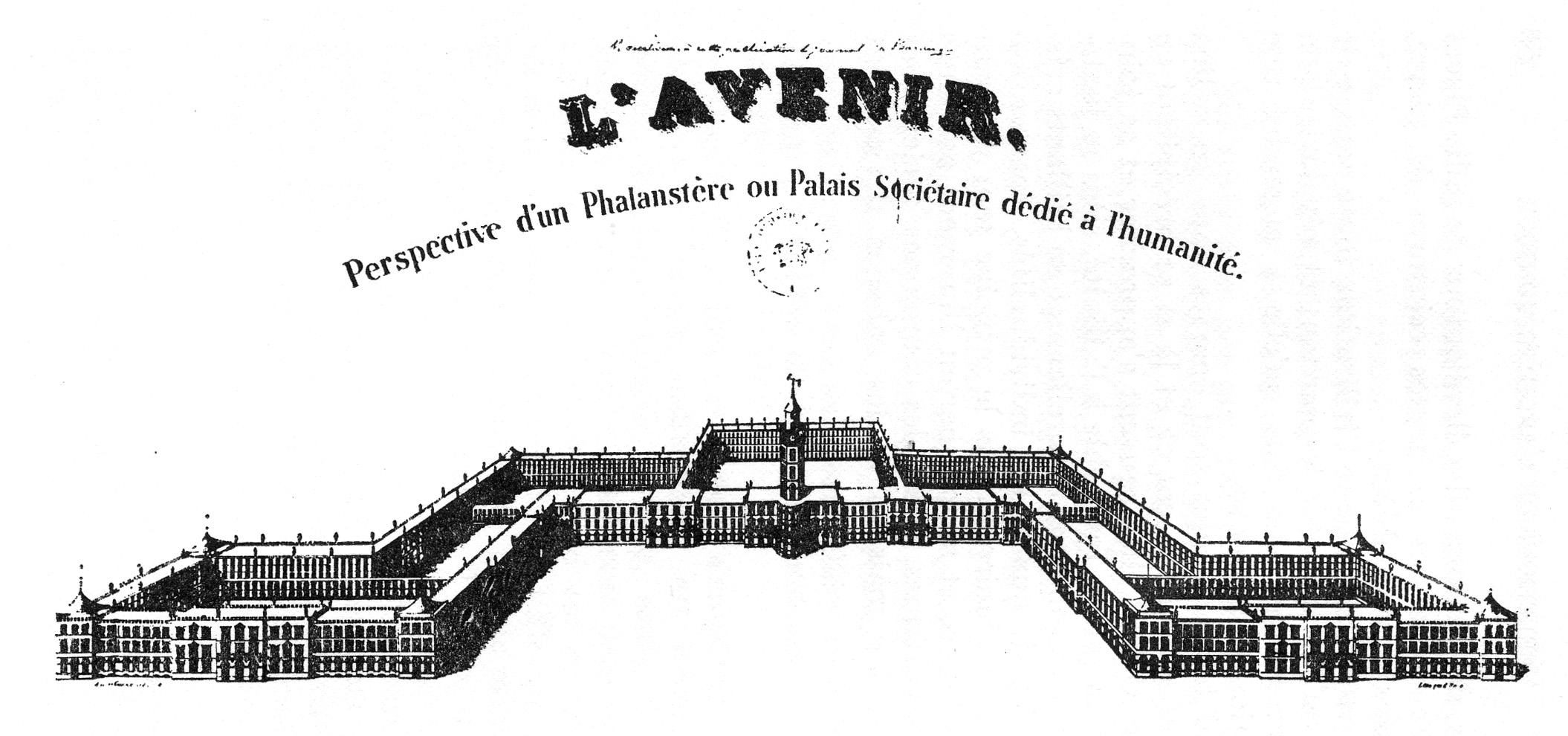
Perspective view of the urban area of Fourier's Phalanstère. Rural area is not shown in the drawing.

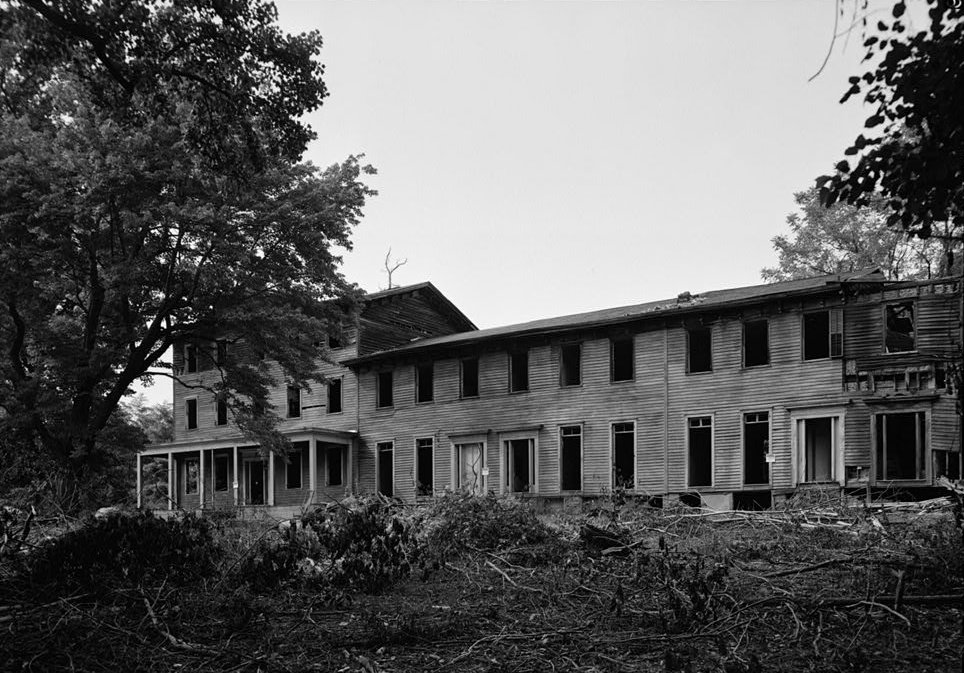
North American Phalanx building in Monmouth County, New Jersey, inspired by Fourier's concept

A phalanstère (or phalanstery) was a type of building designed for a self-contained utopian community, ideally consisting of 500–2,000 people working together for mutual benefit, and developed in the early 19th century by Charles Fourier. Fourier chose the name by combining the French word phalange (phalanx, an emblematic military unit in ancient Greece) with the word monastère (monastery).

== Concept ==
Fourier believed that cooperation was key to the wellbeing of a society, and that workers would be recompensed for their labor according to their contribution. Fourier saw such cooperation occurring in Phalanstères, four-level apartment complexes where the richest had the uppermost apartments and the poorest had ground-floor residences. Wealth would be determined by one's job, and jobs would be assigned based on interest and desire. There were incentives: jobs people might not enjoy doing would receive higher pay. Fourier considered trade, which he associated with Jews, the "source of all evil", and advocated that Jews be forced to perform farm work in the phalansteries.

Fourier believed that the traditional house was a place of exile and oppression of women. He believed gender roles could progress by shaping them within community, more than by pursuits of sexual freedom or other Simonian concepts.

== Structure ==
Fourier conceived the phalanstère as an organized building designed to integrate urban and rural features.

The structure of the phalanstère was composed of three parts: a central part and two lateral wings. The central part was designed for quiet activities. It included dining rooms, meeting rooms, libraries and studies. A lateral wing was designed for labour and noisy activities, such as carpentry, hammering and forging. It also hosted children because they were considered noisy while playing. The other wing contained a caravansary, with ballrooms and halls for meetings with outsiders who had to pay a fee to visit and meet the people of the Phalanx community. This income was thought to sustain the autonomous economy of the phalanstère. The phalanstère also included private apartments and many social halls. A social hall was defined by Fourier as a seristère.

== In France and the United States ==
Though Fourier published several journals in Paris, among them Le Phalanstère, he created no phalanstères in Europe due to a lack of financial support. Several so-called colonies were founded in the United States of America by Albert Brisbane and Horace Greeley.

== Examples ==
- La Colonie of Condé-sur-Vesgre (France, 1832)
- Phalanstery of Scăieni, Wallachia (Romania, 1834–1836)
- La Réunion in Dallas (Texas, 1855)
- Familistère of Guise (Godin) (France, 1859)
- Longo Maï Co-operatives (Europe and Central America, 1973)
- Uranian Phalanstery (New York, 1974–present)

== Legacy ==
In The Conquest of Bread, Peter Kropotkin critiques the concept as "repugnant to millions of human beings ... Isolation, alternating with time spent in society, is the normal desire of human nature." Kropotkin instead advocates for individual apartments with access to communal labour-saving machinery, thereby freeing women from domestic drudgery:

A cart would come to each door and take the boots to be blacked, the crockery to be washed up, the linen to be washed, the small things to be mended (if it were worth while), the carpets to be brushed, and the next morning would bring back the things entrusted to it all well cleaned. A few hours later your hot coffee and your eggs done to a nicety would appear on your table.

In the 20th century, the architect Le Corbusier adapted the concept of the phalanstère when he designed the Unité d'Habitation, a self-contained commune, at Marseille.

== In 19th century publications ==
In the Hungarian play The Tragedy of Man, first published in 1861 by Imre Madách, one of the later scenes takes place in a phalanstery, in a utopian future where the entirety of humanity lives in phalansteries. There are no borders, no nations, and civilization is dominated by science. However, there is no individuality or creativity, emotions are considered an irregularity, and humans are branded with numbers. Four thousand years later, the Sun is dead and Mankind spiritually died along with it in its pursuit of survival.

The residents of Mars live in a phalanstère in the Ecuadorian science fiction story A Voyage to Saturn by Francisco Campos Coello, published in 1900.

In Henri Murger's 1851 work Scenes of Bohemian Life, the source of Giacomo Puccini's opera La Bohème and other musical works, Rodolphe meets a young man described as a phalansterian as he is scouring the streets of Paris to borrow five francs in order to entertain a young woman he plans to make his mistress.

The Phalanstères are mentioned several times in Gustave Flaubert's 1869 novel Sentimental Education: for example, among a list of utopian projects: "plans of phalansteria, projects for cantonal bazaars, systems of public felicity."

They are mentioned in William Morris' News from Nowhere, first published in 1890, with the spelling "phalangsteries."

== See also ==
- Feminism in France
- Kibbutzim
- Oyasato-yakata
- Victor Prosper Considerant
- Félix Milliet
