= Uram =

Uram is a surname. Notable people with the surname include:

- Andy Uram (1915–1984), American football player
- Marek Uram (born 1974), Slovak ice hockey player
- Mihail Uram (born 1924), Hungarian footballer
- Paul Uram (1926–2017), American gymnastics and flexibility coach

== See also ==
- Uran (name)
