= Urano =

- Urano means Uranus in Italian, Portuguese, Spanish, Galician, and Esperanto.

urano- may refer to:

- uranium, chemistry
- of the heavens, astronomy

Urano may refer to:

- Monte Urano, a comune (municipality) in the Province of Ascoli Piceno in the Italian region Marche
- Uranos (comics), a fictional character, a member of the Eternals, a race in the Marvel Comics universe

Urano (浦野) is also an uncommon Japanese family name. About 0.01% of Japanese have this family name. People with this name include:

- Chikako Urano (浦野 千賀子, born 1946), Japanese mangaka
- Chiyuki Urano, Japanese classical baritone and bass
- Hiroshi Urano (born 1989), Japanese baseball pitcher
- Kazumi Urano (浦野 一美, born 1985), Japanese singer and tarento
- Masahiko Urano (浦野 真彦, born 1964), Japanese shogi player
- Yasu Urano (ヤス ウラノ, born 1976), Japanese professional wrestler
- Yayoi Urano (浦野 弥生, born 1969), Japanese Wrestler and Judoka

== See also ==
- Uranus (disambiguation)
