= Urania (ship) =

Several vessels have been named Urania for Urania, the Greek muse of astronomy.

- Urania (1800 ship) was launched in 1795 in Spain and taken in prize. Starting in 1800 she made three voyages from Liverpool as a slave ship in the triangular trade in enslaved people. During the third voyage she was involved in two engagements with French vessels. She was so damaged in the second of these that she was condemned in 1804 after she landed her slaves at Demerara.
- Italian ship Urania – any one of at least three vessels of the Italian navy.
- Urania was a vessel that operated on Lake Washington and Puget Sound from 1907 to around 1941.
- HMS Urania (R05) was a U-class destroyer of the British Royal Navy that saw service during World War II. After the war she was converted into a Type 15 fast anti-submarine frigate and was scrapped in 1971.
- Urania is a steel-hulled sailing vessel that serves the Royal Netherlands Navy as a training ship.
