= Yuran =

Yuran may refer to

== People ==
- Sergei Yuran, Russian football manager and former player
- Yuran Fernandes, Cape Verdean professional footballer
- Yuran Nimasha, Sri Lankan cricketer

== Places ==
- Qater Yuran-e Olya, a village in Iran
- Qater Yuran-e Sofla, a village in Iran

== See also ==
- Uran (disambiguation)
- Yu Rang
