= Ourania =

Ourania may refer to

- Urania or Ourania, the muse of astronomy
- Ourania (novel), by French Nobel laureate J. M. G. Le Clézio
- Ourania Gkouzou (born 1981), Greek volleyball player
- Ourania Rebouli (born 1989), Greek long-distance runner
