= Marie Pape-Carpantier =

French educator

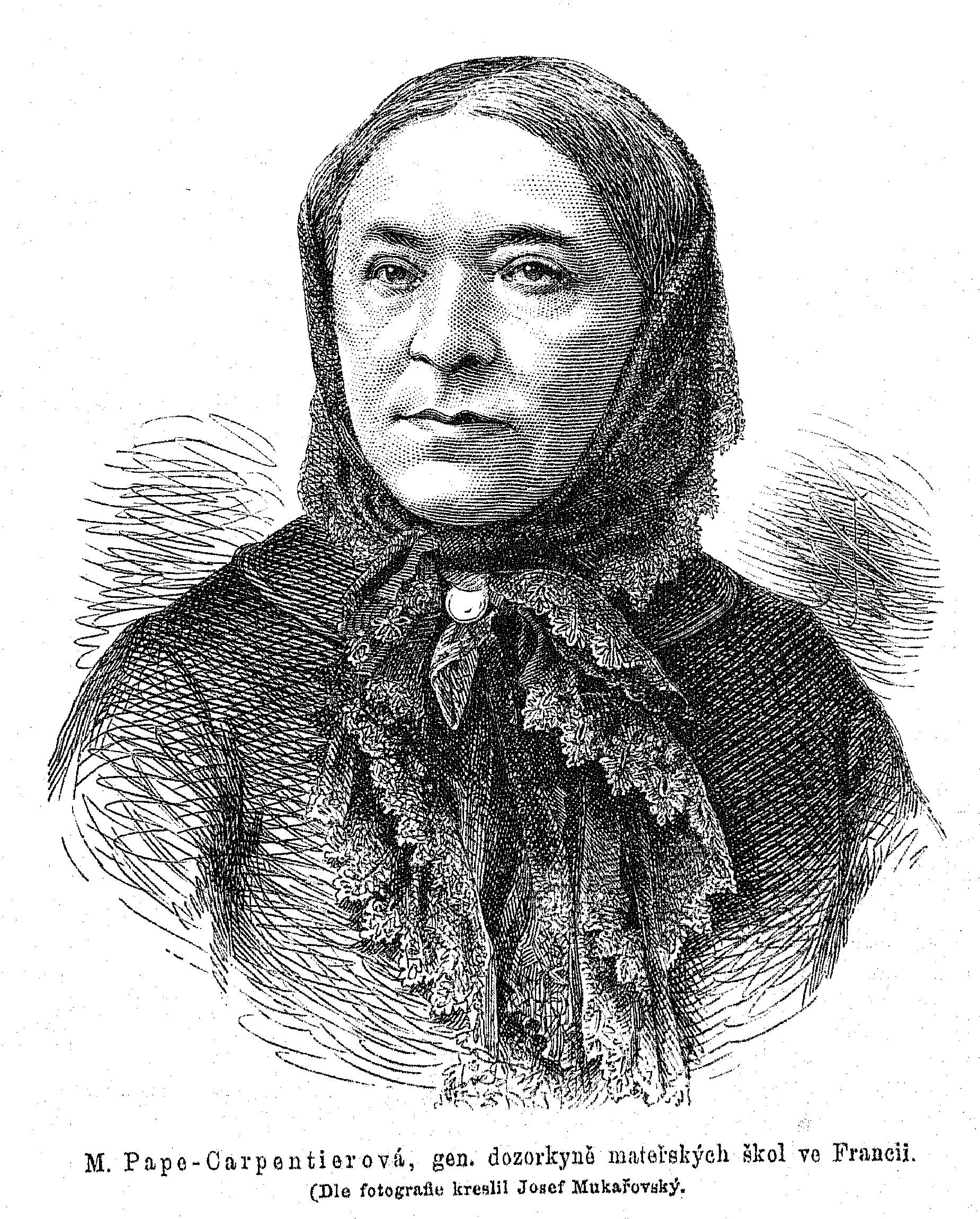
Marie Pape-Carpantier; portrait by Josef Mukařovský

Marie Pape-Carpantier (1815–1878) was a French educator born on 11 September 1815 in Sarthe, France and died in Villiers-le-Bel (Val-d'Oise) on 31 July 1878. She grew to play a major part in revolutionizing education in French schools. She was a feminist who worked to fix poverty, social injustice, and to further the education of girls. She also wrote articles for the weekly French newspaper "The French Economist".
