= Uran (name) =

Uran or Urán may refer to the following people:

== Given name ==
- Uran Botobekov (born 1967), Kyrgyz scholar, journalist, diplomat and publicist
- Uran Kalilov (born 1980), Greco-Roman wrestler from Kyrgyzstan

== Surname ==
- Alojz Uran (born 1945), Slovenian archbishop
- Carlos Urán (born 1980), Colombian cyclist
- Heriberto Urán (born 1954), Colombian cyclist
- Hilmi Uran (1886–1957), Turkish politician and government minister
- Juan Urán (born 1983), Colombian diver
- Presentación Urán González (born 1956), Spanish politician
- Rigoberto Urán (born 1987), Colombian road racing cyclist

== Fictional characters ==
- Uran (character), a.k.a. AstroGirl, the Astro Boy character
