= Presentación Urán González =

Spanish politician

Presentación Urán González (29 May 1956, Madrid) is a Spanish politician and former member of the Spanish Parliament.

Married, with two children, she worked as an administrator before being elected in 1993 as a United Left (IU) deputy for Valencia region and was re-elected again in 1996 and 2000. At the 2004 election, she stood down, although her name appeared on the IU list in fifteenth place in a district where the party had never won more than two seats. In Congress she was fourth secretary and also served on the New Technologies commission in Congress.
