= Charles Rivière =

French painter

Charles Rivière (1848–1920) was a French painter.

== Biography ==
Rivière was born in Orléans and died in Paris. A friend of Germain David-Nillet, he made several visits to Le Faouët from 1903 onwards, and there painted landscapes and religious paintings. He exhibited at the Paris Salon.

== Works ==
His works include:

- Fin de combat. Bretagne. 1794 (1905), Musée d'art et d'histoire of Cholet.
- Breton (1910), Musée du Faouët.
- Le tambour de ville (1914), Musée du Faouët.
- Le vieux puits, place Bellanger (1914), Musée du Faouët.
- Chute de l'avion en flammes, Musée du Faouët.
- Persannages dans une étable (Figures in a stable).

== Gallery ==
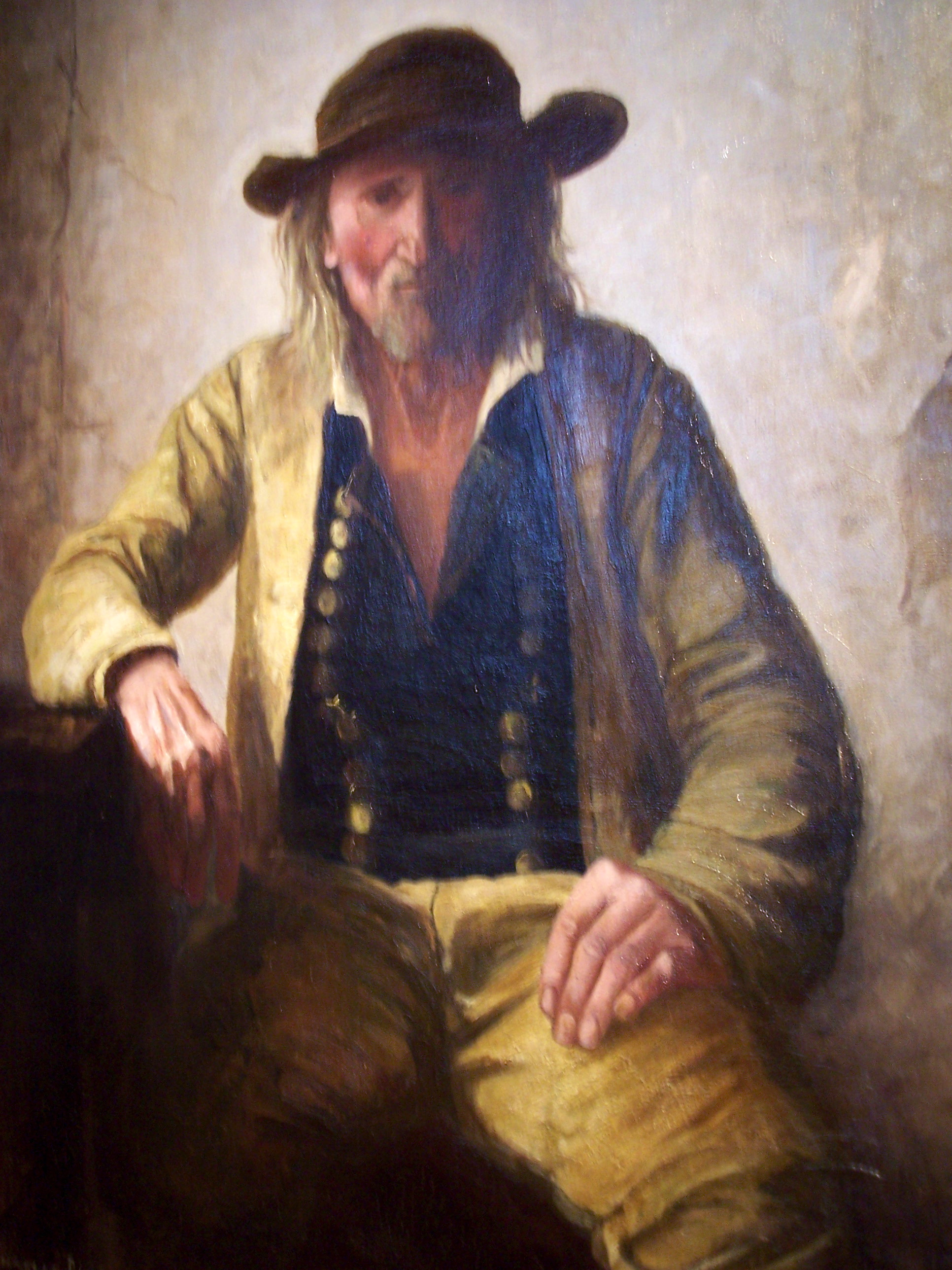
Breton (1910), Musée du Faouët

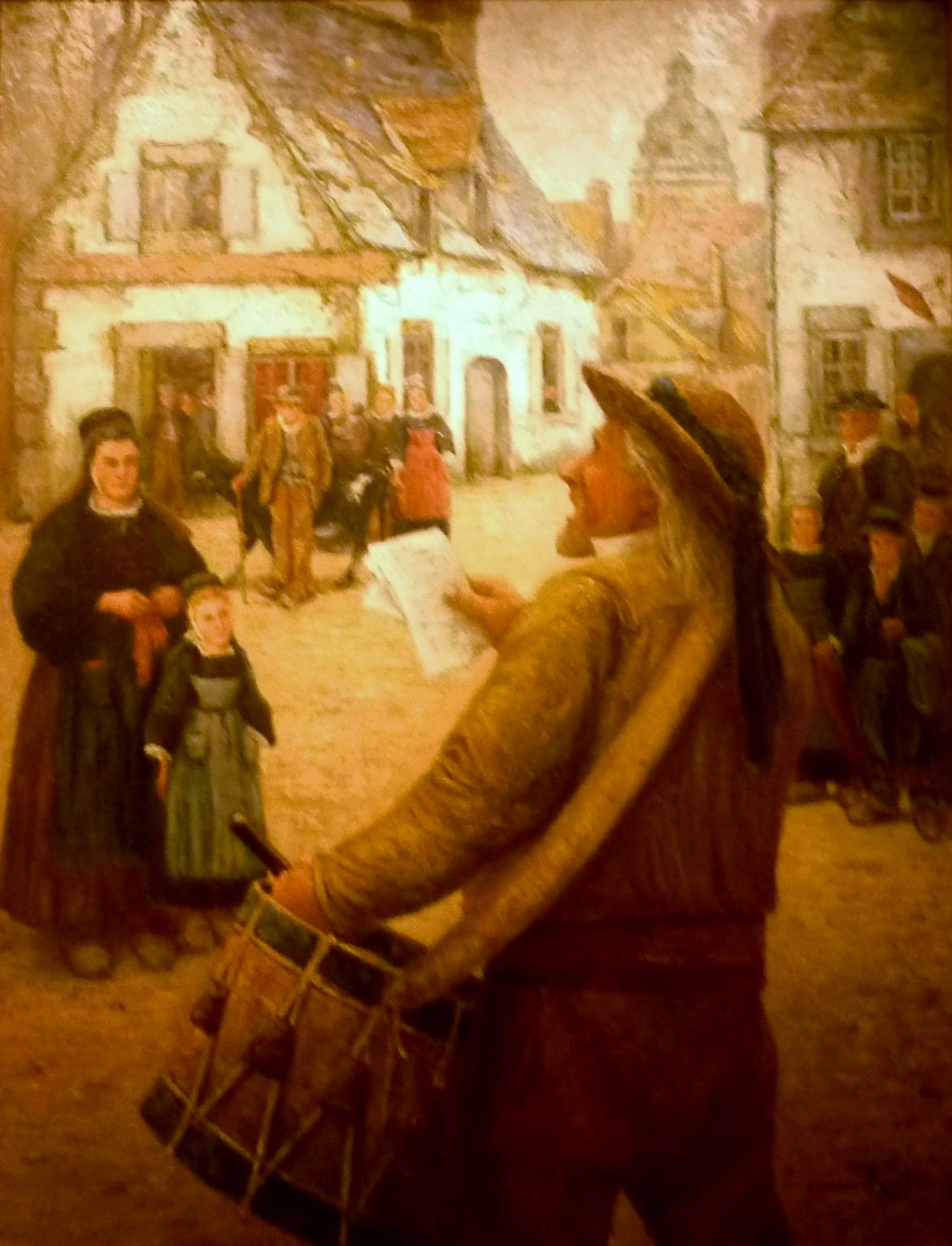
Le tambour de ville (1914), Musée du Faouët

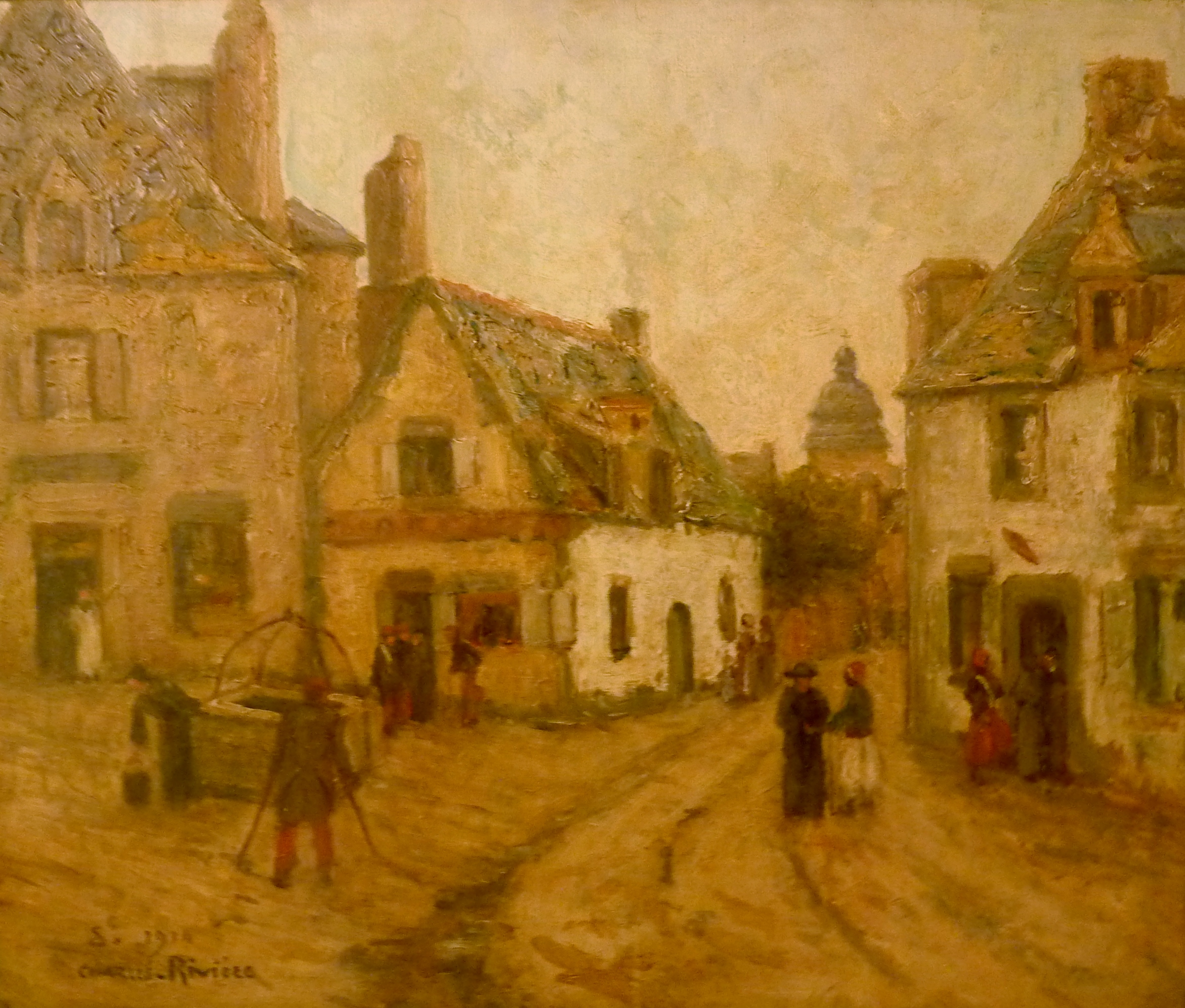
Le vieux puits, place Bellanger (1914), Musée du Faouët
