= Eugène Bonnemère =

French historian and writer (1813–1893)

Joseph-Eugène Bonnemère (21 February 1813, Saumur – 1 November 1893, Louerre) was a French historian and writer.

The grandson of Joseph Toussaint Bonnemère (1746–1794), the mayor of Saumur, Bonnemère began his literary career, in 1841, through theater plays, but he earned a reputation chiefly owing to a series of historical publications.

Bonnemère collaborated to the Revue de Paris and La Démocratie Pacifique. From 1858 onward, he sent letters on economy to the Messager Russe in Moscow as well.

He was the president of the Société Parisienne des Études Spirites. He was the father of Lionel Bonnemère (1843–1905).

== Publications ==
- Paysans au dix-neuvième siècle, Nantes, 1845;
- Histoire de l'association agricole, Nantes, 1849;
- Histoire des Paysans, 1856;
- La Vendée, en 1793, 1866;
- Le Roman de l'Avenir, 1867;
- La France sons Louis XIV;
- Louis Hubert, curé vendéen, 1868;
- Histoire des Camisards, 1869;
- Études historiques saumuroises, 1869;
- Les Paysans avant 1789, 1872;
- Histoire de la Jacquerie, 1874;
- Histoire populaire de la France, 3 vols., 1874–79;
- L'Âme et ses manifestations à travers l'histoire, 1881;
- Histoire de quatre paysans, 1881;
- La Prise de la Bastille, 1881;
- Les Guerres de la Vendée, 1884;
- Hier et aujourd'hui, 1886;
- Histoire des guerres de religion, XVI^{e} siècle, 1886.

== Sources ==
- Angelo De Gubernatis, Dictionnaire international des écrivains du jour, vol. 1, Florence, Louis Niccolai, 1891, p. 365.
