= Urania National Film Theatre =

Film theatre in Budapest

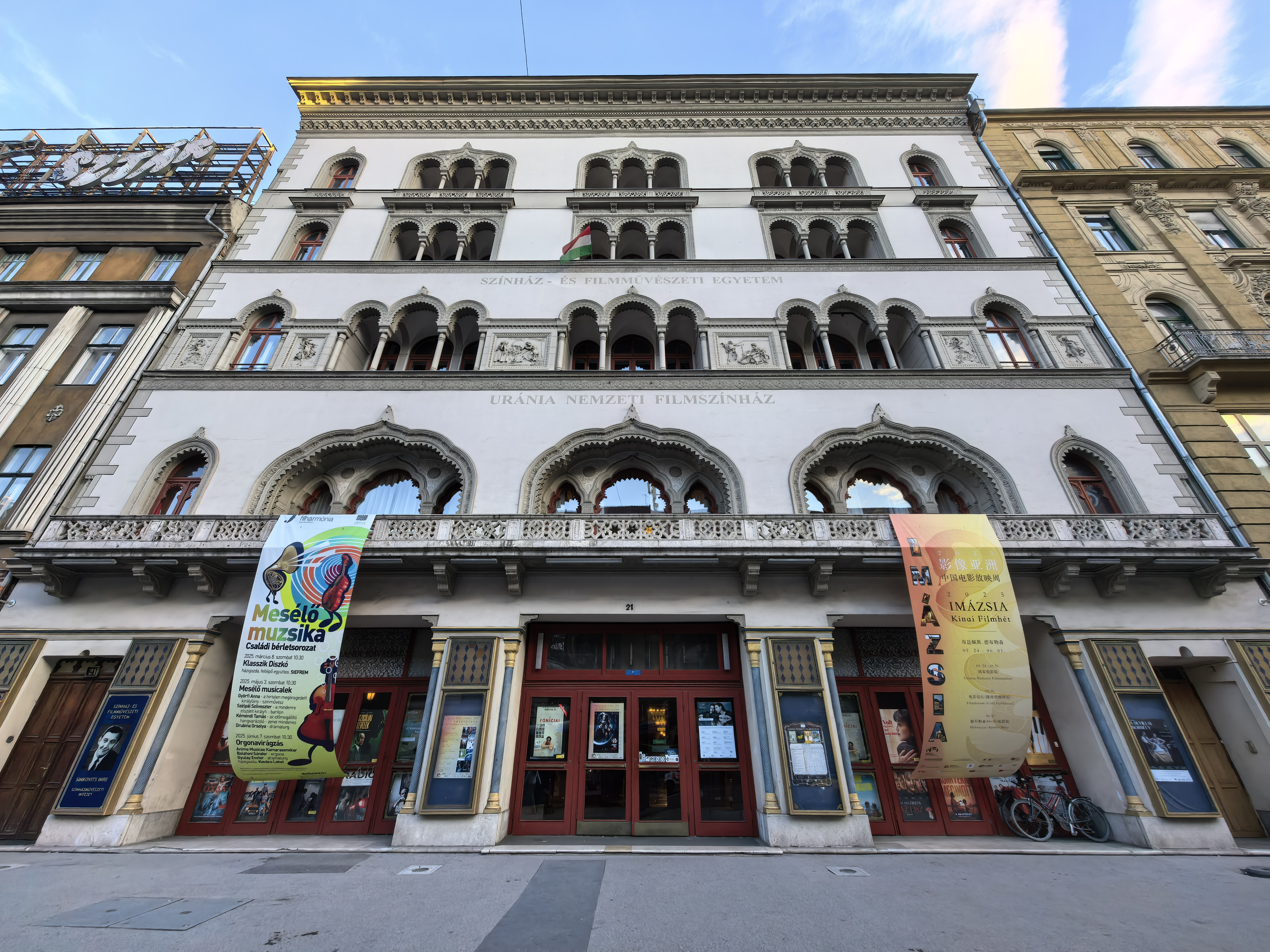

The Urania National Film Theatre (Uránia Nemzeti Filmszínház), formerly the Urania Hungarian Scientific Theatre, is in Budapest, Hungary.

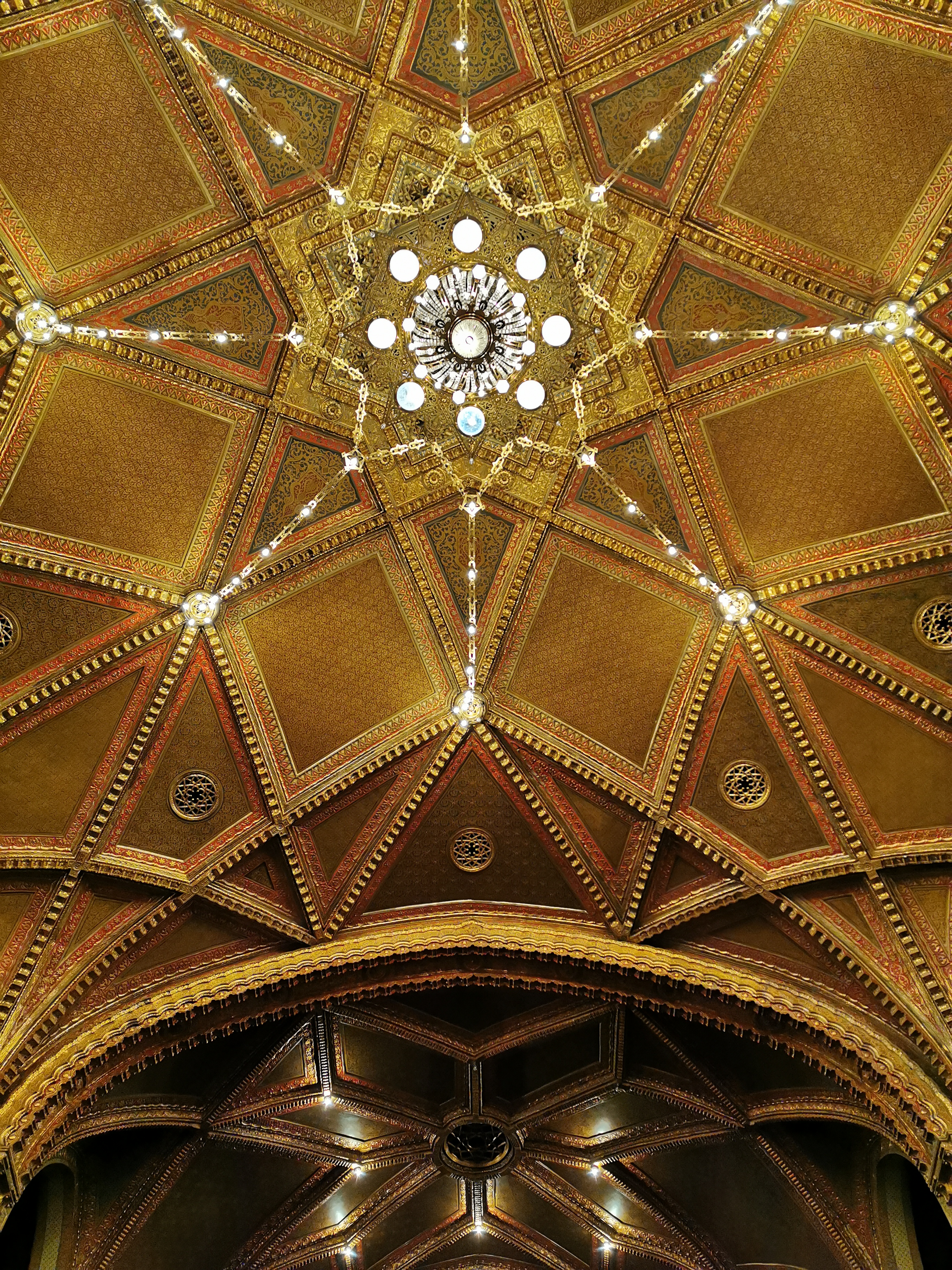
Interior of Urania theatre

Designed by Henrik Schmahl, a German-born architect who lived in Budapest, it was built in 1896. Its street front follows the arrangement of late 14th-century Venetian palazzos, with ornament of Moorish character, and the oriental effect is stronger inside, where most of the decoration, including the seemingly wooden ceilings, is painted plaster. It is a registered national monument. It closed in 1999 due to financial issues before being renovated, restored, and reopening. Two basement theater rooms were added under the main hall. They seat 60 people each and are named after the director Zoltán Fábri and the actor Gyula Csortos, and a fourth, 33-seat room named after the actress Mari Törőcsik opened in 2024. The restoration was completed in 2002, and in 2006 the building received a Europa Nostra award for it. In 2025 it won a heritage award.

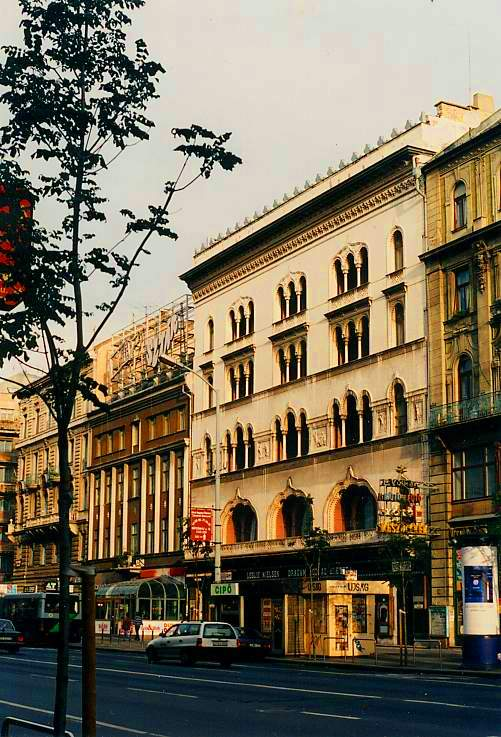

It has a cafe. It is on the Rákóczi roadway. It was built as a music and dance hall for Kálmán Rimanóczy. The Uránia Society rented it in 1899 and renamed it the Uránia Hungarian Scientific Theatre.

In spring 1901 A táncz (The Dance), directed by Béla Zitkovszky and regarded as the first Hungarian film staged for the camera, was shot on the building's rooftop; the film is lost. The upper floors had apartments. The interior had first been adapted for film screenings in 1917. In 1929 the building was renovated to become a cinema, and from 1930 it operated as a UFA cinema.

In 2017 it hosted a Chinese Film Festival. Some of the showings for a celebration of 110 years of Hungarian animated films were shown at the theater.in 2024.

== See also ==
- Budapest's Palace District
