= Uranian Phalanstery =

American artistic collective

The Uranian Phalanstery is an artist collective in New York City associated with the First New York Gnostic Lyceum Temple. The husband-and-wife team of Richard Oviet Tyler and Dorothea Baer established the Uranian Phalanstery in 1974, with beginnings even earlier, on the Lower East Side of Manhattan. It later moved to different buildings on the Upper West Side. For over thirty years, it has served as a stimulating, art-filled oasis for many gnostic artists. Due to the severe physical deterioration of the building, the Phalanstery sold the property and moved into a brownstone in the Sugar Hill area. Dorothea died in 2012. The Uranian Phalanstery regularly hosts community events under the guidance of Medi Matin showcasing exhibitions and performances.

== History ==
Richard Tyler and Dorothea Baer, two artists who met while attending the Chicago Institute of Fine Art c. 1956, established the Uranian Phalanstery in 1974. The organization was a work in progress, beginning in the late 1950s, when the couple first moved into two adjacent buildings on the Lower East Side. These buildings housed the organization for over thirty years. Due to physical deterioration of the original buildings, the Uranian Phalanstery moved to the Upper West Side in 2010. The organization is now run by Dorothea Tyler's protege, director and artist, Mehdi Matin.

== Ideology ==
The Phalanstery's ideology, rights, benefits, and codes of conduct were detailed in a Manifesto, written by Richard, and expressed the fundamental purpose of the organization as:

Members shall follow the "Practice of the Eightfold Way on the Path" and exercise "Creativity in Practice of the Path", executing a "self documented life work on the way".

The Manifesto and the Phalanstery itself were influenced by a diverse range of texts, religions and spiritual practices, specifically the teachings of Fourier, who recommended the reorganization of society into small communities (phalansteries), living in common. The Phalanstery was concerned with confronting the ethos of society, interjecting spiritual aspects into everyday life, and pioneering what is now referred to as 'new age' ideas. Richard viewed creativity as "a mantic procedure of the intuitive function" and was dedicated to merging life with art by building a supportive, nurturing community of like-minded artists.

In order to spread the message of the Phalanstery, Richard Tyler would sell publications as "The Uranian Press", along with political trinkets, from a pushcart which he would walk from his basement studio on 326 E. 4th Street to the corner of Judson Church, at Lafayette and E 4th Streets.

Artists who were influenced by, the Phalanstery was influenced by the contemporary psychedelic movement and made contact with innovative creators and thinkers including Peter Shauman, Axel Gross, Timothy Leary, Monroe Wheeler, Al Hensson, Claes Oldenburg, Ornette Coleman, Thom D'Vita, Nick Bubash, and Ed Hardy.

== Artists/Members ==
- Richard Oviet Tyler: artist and founder of the Uranian Phalanstery. Tyler was born in Lansing, Michigan in 1926 and attended the Art Institute of Chicago c. 1953-1957.
- Dorothea Baer Tyler: wife of Richard Oviet Tyler and co-founder of the Uranian Phalanstery. Tyler also attended the Art Institute of Chicago c. 1953–1957.

== Publications ==
The Uranian Press was started by Richard in the late 1950s and served as a means for the Phalanstery to spread their message to a wider audience. Key publications of the Uranian Press include:

- The Schizophrenic Bomb (1961), which details Richard's antinuclear position on war and conflict.
- Peranoids Primer (1961)
- Mischances of Morely Perus in the Universal Mind (1960)
- Creativity as a Mantic Procedure of the Intuitive Function (1959) which examined the unconsciousness.
- The Biography of a Flower

== See also ==
- Phalanstère
