= Uranus (disambiguation) =

Uranus is the seventh planet from the Sun.

Uranus may also refer to:

- Uranus (mythology), an ancient Greek sky god

== Fiction ==
- Uranus (novel), a 1948 novel by Marcel Aymé
- Sailor Uranus or Haruka Tenoh, a character in Sailor Moon
- Uranus, a character in Duckman
- Uranus, a character in Bloody Roar
- Uranus, a character in Battle Arena Toshinden
- Uranus Corporation, a fictional corporation in The Groove Tube

== Music ==
- "Uranus, the Magician", a movement in Gustav Holst's The Planets
- Uranus (EP), a 1993 EP by Shellac

== Other uses ==
- Uranus (astrology), the astrological aspects of Uranus
- Uranus (film), a 1990 film starring Gérard Depardieu
- German trawler Uranus, a vorpostenboot briefly in service in 1940
- Club Uranus, an event at The EndUp
- Operation Uranus, a Soviet World War II offensive to win the Battle of Stalingrad
- Uranus Hill or Dealul Spirii, a hill in Bucharest, Romania
- Uranus, Missouri, an unincorporated small town and tourist attraction along the former U.S. Route 66 in Missouri

== People with the surname ==
- Nicephorus Uranus or Nikephoros Ouranos, Byzantine strategos of Antiocheia from 999 to c. 1010

== See also ==
- Urania (disambiguation)
- Uranium, a chemical element
- Uranium (disambiguation)
