= Condé-sur-Vesgre =

- Commune
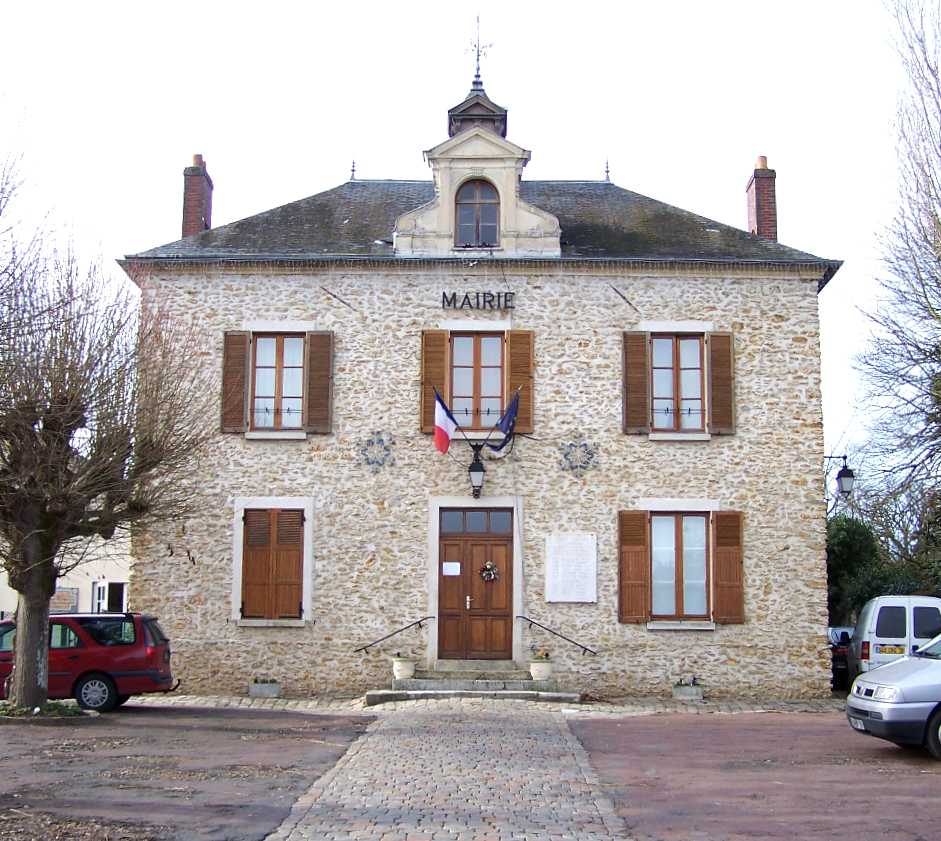
- Town hall
- Location of Condé-sur-Vesgre
- Location within France Location within Île-de-France (region)
- Coordinates: 48°44′32″N 1°39′42″E
- Country: France
- Region: Île-de-France
- Department: Yvelines
- Arrondissement: Mantes-la-Jolie
- Canton: Bonnières-sur-Seine
- Intercommunality: Pays houdanais

Government
  - Mayor (2020–2026): Josette Jean
- Area^{1}: 10.71 km^{2} (4.14 sq mi)
- Elevation: 107 m (351 ft)
- Highest elevation: 175 m (574 ft)
- Lowest elevation: 105 m (344 ft)
- Population (2023): 1,279
  - Density: 119.4/km^{2} (309.3/sq mi)
- Time zone: UTC+01:00 (CET)
  - Summer (DST): UTC+02:00 (CEST)
- INSEE/Postal code: 78171 /78113
- ^{1} French Land Register data, which excludes lakes, ponds, glaciers > 1 km^{2} (0.386 sq mi or 247 acres) and river estuaries.

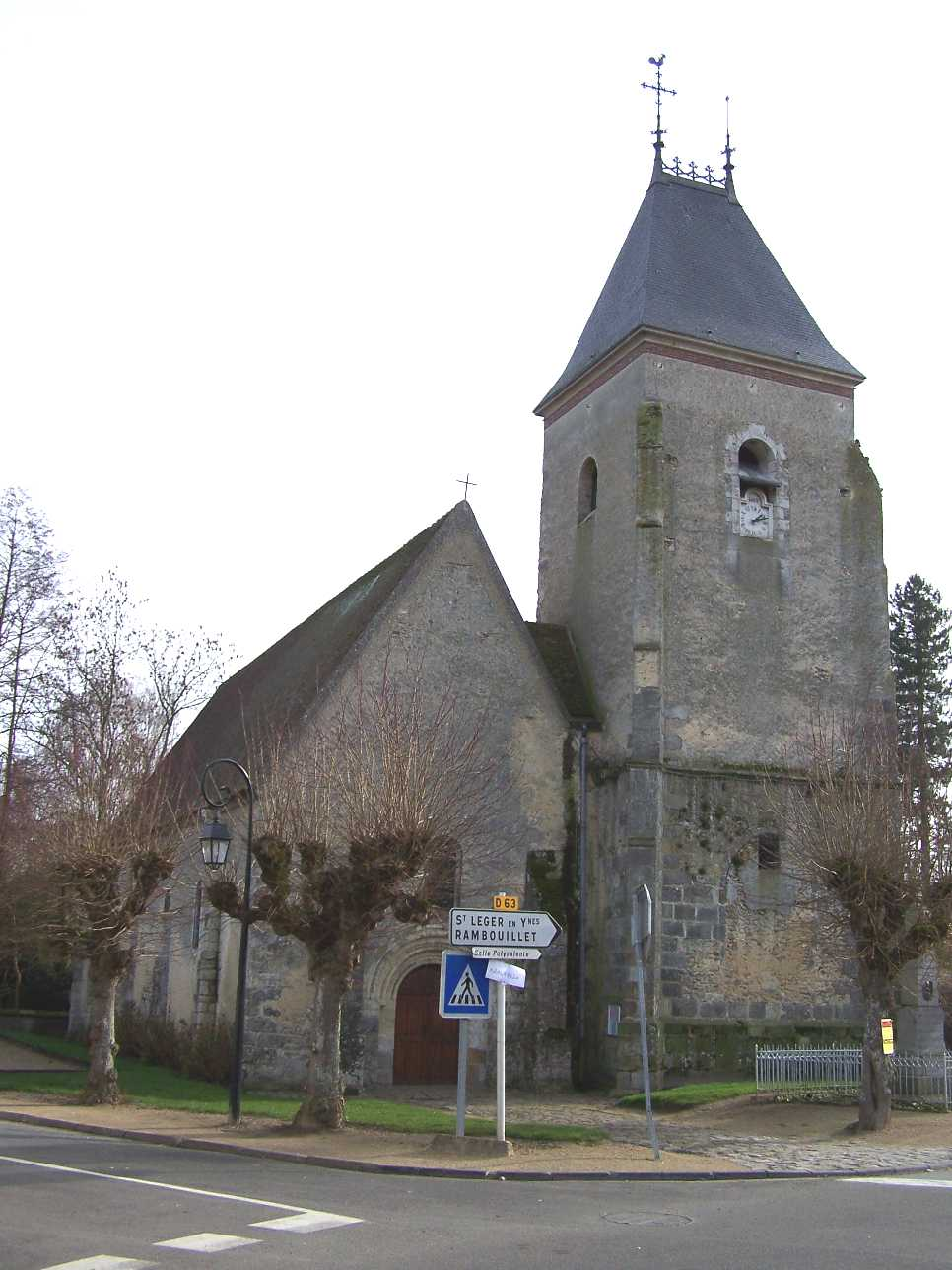
Saint-Germain-de-Paris

Condé-sur-Vesgre (French pronunciation: [kɔ̃de syʁ vɛɡʁ]) is a commune in the Yvelines department in the Île-de-France region in north-central France.

== See also ==
- Communes of the Yvelines department
