= Italian ship Urania =

Urania has been borne by at least three ships of the Italian Navy and may refer to:

- Italian cruiser Urania, a Partenope-class cruiser launched in 1891 and discarded in 1912.
- Italian corvette Urania (1943), a Gabbiano-class corvette launched in 1943.
- Italian corvette Urania (F 552), a Minerva-class corvette launched in 1986 and sold in 2016 to Bangladesh for coastguard service. She was renamed CGS Mansoor Ali.
