= Uranium (disambiguation) =

Uranium is a chemical element with symbol U and atomic number 92.

Uranium may also refer to:

== Chemistry ==
- Isotopes of uranium
  - Uranium-232
  - Uranium-233
  - Uranium-234
  - Uranium-235
  - Uranium-236
  - Uranium-238
  - Uranium-239
  - Uranium-240

== Places ==
- Uranium (Caria), a town of ancient Caria, now in Turkey
- Uranium City, Saskatchewan, a Canadian settlement

== Arts ==
- Uranium (album), 2015 album by Danish dancehall band Bikstok

== See also ==
- List of uranium mines
- U (disambiguation)
