= Francesco Tortoli =

Italian painter

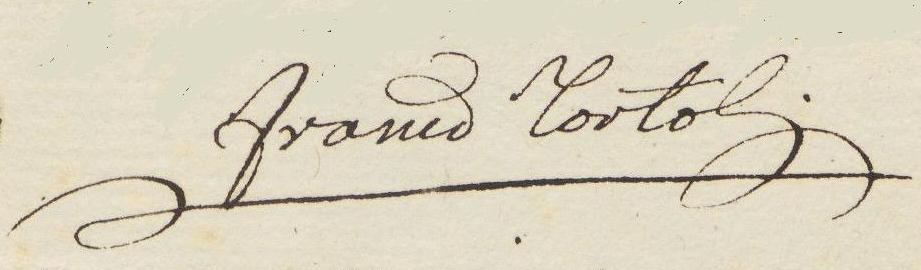
- Tortoli's signature, 1822
- Born: 1790; Florence, Italy
- Died: 20 May 1824 (aged 33–34); Naples, Kingdom of the Two Sicilies
- Occupation: Scenographer

Francesco Tortoli (or Tortolj) (1790 – 20 May 1824) was an Italian scenographer, active in Naples from 1808 at the city's principal theatres—Teatro San Carlo, Teatro del Fondo and Teatro dei Fiorentini. He was the creator of sets for numerous productions including those for the world premieres of Rossini's La gazzetta, Otello, Armida, Mosè in Egitto, and La donna del lago. Tortoli was born in Florence and died in Naples of cholera at the age of 35.

== Life and career ==
Born in Florence in 1790, Tortoli was the nephew and student of Antonio Niccolini, a Tuscan architect who later had a substantial career in Naples. Niccolini rebuilt the interior of the Teatro San Carlo after it burned down in 1816 and was also the theatre's chief scenographer. Tortoli was active as a scenery painter under the direction of Niccolini by 1808 when he worked on the sets for the first performance of Antonio Sacchini's Edipo a Colono at the Teatro San Carlo.

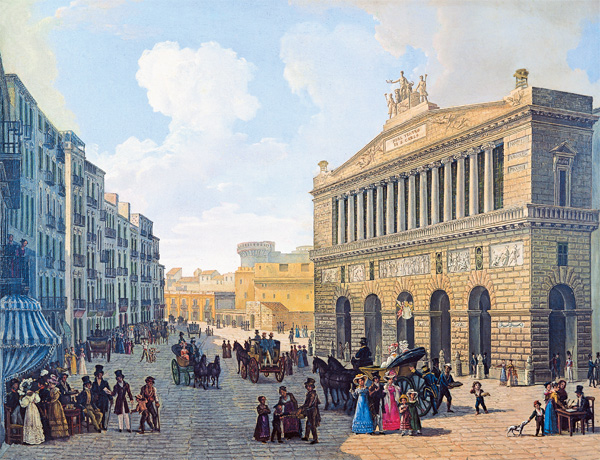
The Teatro San Carlo, rebuilt after the fire of 1816

By the time Rossini arrived in Naples in the summer of 1815, Niccolini, at the height of his prestige and over-committed on multiple projects, was getting ready to concede the titular post of the San Carlo's chief scenographer to Tortoli. After the San Carlo had been destroyed by fire in February 1816, opera productions were held in other Neapolitan theatres during the rebuilding period. Tortoli was the scenographer for the premieres of Rossini's La gazzetta (Teatro dei Fiorentini, 26 September 1816) and Otello (Teatro del Fondo, 4 December 1816). When the newly rebuilt San Carlo was inaugurated on 12 January 1817, Tortoli was one of the scenographers for the gala performance of Simone Mayr's Il sogno di Partenope. By February of that year, when he designed the production of Carlo Saccenti's Aganadeca, Tortoli was the titular scenographer at the San Carlo, a post he would hold until his death, although Niccolini continued to provide overall artistic supervision of the productions there.

When the impresario Domenico Barbaja was nearing the end of his management of the Neapolitan royal theatres, Tortoli also had the authority to sign contracts on the theatres' behalf. Shortly after the success of Donizetti's opera L'ajo nell'imbarazzo in 1824, Donizetti signed a contract with Tortoli to adapt the work for Naples as Don Gregorio, although it was not staged there until 1826. Both Barbaja and Tortoli had found themselves under suspicion in February 1824 after a fire broke out beneath the stage. While it was quickly put out, suspicion arose because Barbaja's management contract was about to run out (and with it, a loss of several forms of revenue). With the discovery of accounting irregularities on Barbaja's part, it was felt that the intendant had deliberately set fire to the opera house. Also accused as being part of the plot were Scipione Cerrone (the theatre's fireworks expert) and Luigi Corazza (the head of stage machinery). Barbaja was placed under house arrest, but Tortoli was incarcerated in the Santa Maria Apparente prison where he contracted cholera. On the request of Niccolini, he was taken under guard from the prison to the Barbaja's villa in Mergellina on the Neapolitan coast where he died on 20 May 1824. A hearing two months later cleared both men for lack of evidence.

== World premiere productions ==
World premieres for which Tortoli was the scenographer include:

Operas

- Rossini, La gazzetta, Teatro dei Fiorentini, 26 September 1816
- Rossini, Otello, Teatro del Fondo, 4 December 1816
- Mayr, Mennone e Zemira, Teatro San Carlo, 2 March 1817
- Rossini, Armida Teatro San Carlo, 1 November 1817
- Morlacchi, Boadicea, Teatro San Carlo, 13 January 1818
- Rossini, Mosè in Egitto, Teatro San Carlo, 5 March 1818
- Domenico Tritto, Il trionfo di Trajano, Teatro San Carlo, 30 May 1818
- Carafa, Berenice in Siria, Teatro San Carlo, 29 July 1818
- Rossini, La donna del lago, Teatro San Carlo, 24 September 1819
- Raimondi, Ciro in Babilonia, Teatro San Carlo, 19 March 1820
- Luigi Carlini, Solimano secondo ovvero Le tre sultane, Teatro San Carlo, 30 May 1820
- Mercadante, Anacreonte in Samo, Teatro San Carlo, 1 August 1820
- Rossini, Maometto II, Teatro San Carlo, 3 December 1820
- Luigi Carlini, Adelaide di Baviera, Teatro San Carlo, 12 January 1821
- Generali, Elena ed Olfredo, Teatro San Carlo, 9 August 1821
- Francesco Sampieri, Valmiro e Zaida, Teatro San Carlo, 26 September 1821
- Generali, La sposa indiana, Teatro San Carlo, 12 January 1822
- Rossini, Zelmira, Teatro San Carlo, 16 February 1822
- Mayr, Atalia, Teatro San Carlo, 10 March 1822
- Generali, Argene e Alsindo, Teatro San Carlo, 30 May 1822
- Pavesi, Ines d'Almeida, Teatro San Carlo, 11 December 1822
- Mercadante, Gli Sciti, Teatro San Carlo, 18 March 1823
- Donizetti, Aristea, Teatro San Carlo, 30 May 1823
- Donizetti, Alfredo il Grande, Teatro San Carlo, 2 July 1823
- Raimondi, Argia, Teatro San Carlo, 6 July 1823
- Sapienza, Rodrigo, Teatro San Carlo, 28 August 1823
- Mercadante, Costanzo ed Almeriska, Teatro San Carlo, 22 November 1823
- Raimondi, Le nozze dei sanniti, Teatro San Carlo, 24 February 1824

Ballets

- Wenzel Robert von Gallenberg. Atalanta ed Ippomene (choreography by Salvatore Taglioni), Teatro San Carlo, 30 May 1817
- Mercadante, Il servo balordo (choreography by Salvatore Taglioni), Teatro San Carlo, 1 February 1818
