= Elisa Orlandi =

Italian opera singer

- Born: 1811
- Died: 1834 (aged 23)
- Occupation: Italian opera singer
- Years active: 1829–1834

Elisa Orlandi (1811–1834) was an Italian opera singer who was active at major opera houses in Italy from 1829 until her sudden death in 1834. Possessing a wide vocal range with a significant amount of coloratura facility, she tackled roles from both the mezzo-soprano and soprano repertoires. She is best remembered today for portraying the role of Giovanna Seymour (Jane Seymour) in the world premiere of Gaetano Donizetti's Anna Bolena in 1830.

== Biography ==
Born in Macerata, Orlandi's family moved to Padua soon after her birth. She studied singing in that city with Nardelli and made her professional debut there in 1829 at the age of 18. Later that year, she made successful appearances in Milan and Rome. On 24 November 1829, she portrayed Isaura to the Amenaide of Giuditta Pasta in Gioachino Rossini's Tancredi at the Teatro Comunale di Bologna in the presence of the composer.

Orlandi made her debut at the Teatro Regio di Parma on 6 February 1830 as Fiorilla in Rossini's Il turco in Italia. While in Parma, she also sang in several concerts at the court of Marie Louise, Duchess of Parma. She made several appearances at the Teatro della Canobbiana in Milan later that year, including the house's first stagings of Giacomo Meyerbeer's Il crociato in Egitto (Palmide), Rossini's Le comte Ory (Alice), Rossini's Aureliano in Palmira (Zenobia), and Donizetti's Olivo e Pasquale (Isabella). She sang the role of Giovanna Seymour in the world premiere of Donizetti's Anna Bolena at the Teatro Carcano in Milan on 26 December 1830. She later returned to that house in 1831 to portray Metilde in Donizetti's Gianni di Calais.

In the autumn of 1832, she was cast as Adina in the Teatro Carignano Turin's first staging of Donizetti's L'elisir d'amore. On 2 January 1833 she portrayed Eleonora in the world premiere of Donizetti's Il furioso all'isola di San Domingo at the Teatro Valle in Rome and returned to the Teatro della Canobbiana for several more appearances later that year, including Joseph Weigl's L'imboscata, the premiere of Cesare Pugni's Il contrabbandiere, and the house's first stagings of Giovanni Pacini's Il falegname di Livonia (as Catterina) and Pietro de Moyana's Emma di Fondi (as Emma). She also sang the roles of Adina, Alice, and Carlotta in Saverio Mercadante's Elisa e Claudio at the Teatro della Canobbiana that year.

In 1834, Orlandi suddenly collapsed and died backstage at the opera house in Rovigo just prior to going on stage as Adalgisa in Bellini's Norma. Everything had seemed to point to a brilliant opera career for the young singer who was just 23 years old at the time of her death.
