= L'ajo nell'imbarazzo =

Opera by Gaetano Donizetti

- Opera by Gaetano Donizetti
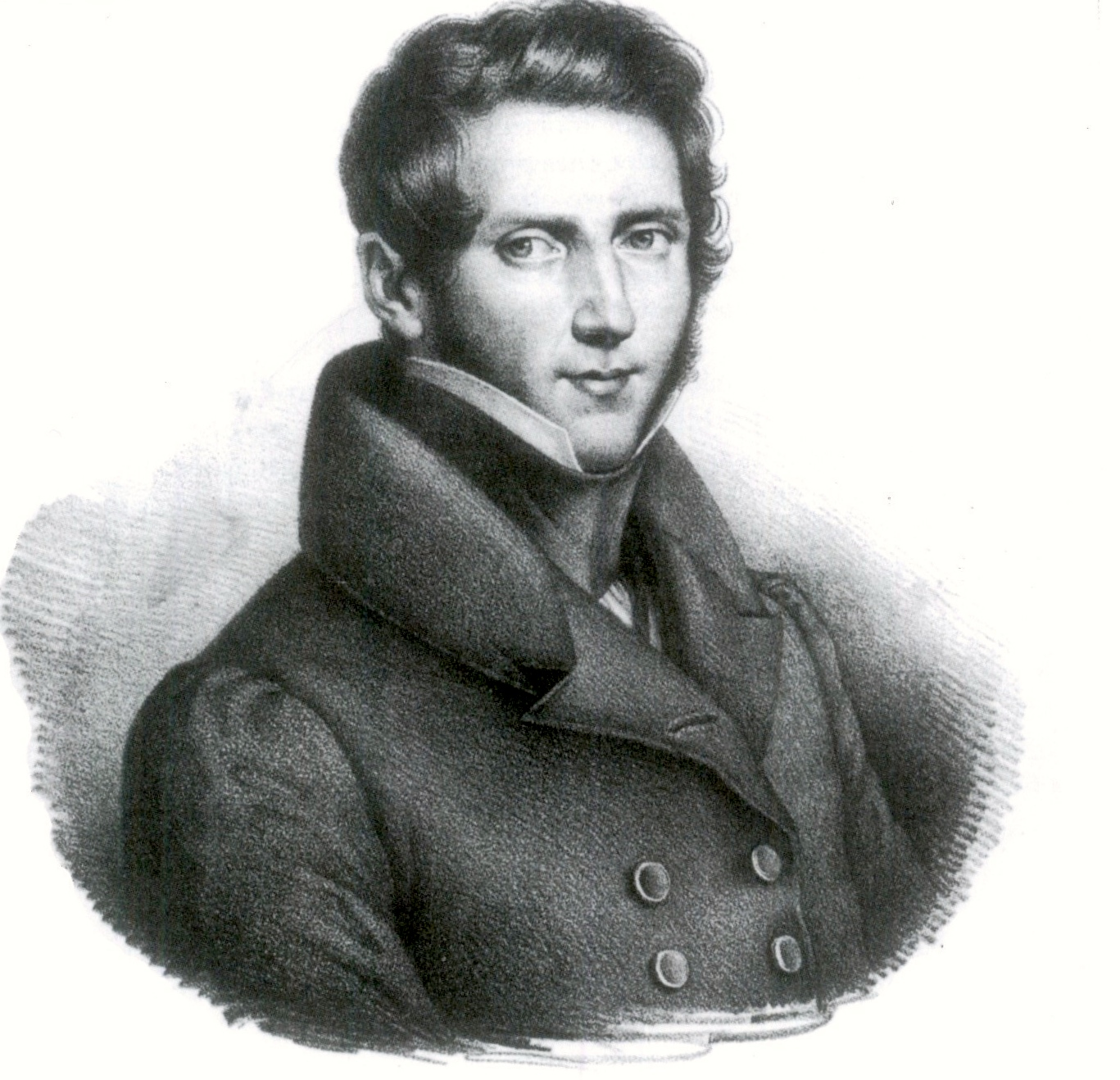
- Donizetti as a young man
- Librettist: Jacopo Ferretti
- Language: Italian
- Based on: play by Giovanni Giraud
- Premiere: 4 February 1824; Teatro Valle, Rome

L'ajo nell'imbarazzo (The Tutor Embarrassed or The Tutor in a Jam) is a melodramma giocoso, or opera, in two acts by Gaetano Donizetti. The Italian libretto was written by Jacopo Ferretti, after the 1807 play by Giovanni Giraud. At its premiere at the Teatro Valle, Rome, on 4 February 1824, it "was greeted with wild enthusiasm [and] it was with this opera that [...] Donizetti had his first really lasting success" During revisions planned for the 1826 production in Naples, Donizetti renamed the opera Don Gregorio, and it is under that name that most later productions were staged.

== Performance history ==
19th century

Performances were given in many Italian cities and it became the first of the composer's operas to be given outside the country, with productions mounted in Vienna, Dresden, Barcelona, and Rio de Janeiro.

However, before the planned Naples production of 1826, Donizetti revised the opera under the title of Don Gregorio, and under that name, it premiered at the Teatro Nuovo in Naples on 11 June 1826. That same year, it also was given at La Scala. On 28 July 1846 it was first given in London, but "seems to have disappeared from view until it turned up again in Italy in the twentieth century".

20th century and beyond

It was presented at the Teatro Donizetti in the composer's home town of Bergamo in 1959 and an Italian TV production was broadcast in 1964. A successful staging by the Wexford Festival in 1973 led to it appearing in four additional European cities between 1975 and 1990 and a new video recording was made from live performances given by the Teatro Donizetti in November 2007.

== Roles ==
Roles, voice types, premiere cast
Role	Voice type	Premiere cast, 4 February 1824 Conductor:
Madama Gilda Talemanni, Enrico's wife	soprano	Maria Ester Mombelli
Old Marquis Giulio	baritone	Antonio Tamburini
Marquis Enrico, son of Giulio	tenor	Savino Monelli
Marquis Pippetto, son of Giulio	tenor	Giovanni Puglieschi
Don Gregorio Cordebono	baritone	Nicola Tacci
Leonarda, elderly maid	mezzo-soprano	Agnese Loyselet
Simone, servant	bass	Luigi De Dominicis
Servants and waiters of the Marquis

== Synopsis ==
Time: Early nineteenth century
Place: An Italian city

Marquis Giulio demands that his sons, Enrico and Pippetto, grow up in complete ignorance of all matters of the flesh. Yet Enrico has secretly married Gilda, and they even have a son. Exasperated by the life he's forced to lead, the youth begs the elderly tutor Gregorio for help, and has him meet his wife. When, however, the Marquis arrives, Gilda remains trapped in Gregorio's room. She worries, for she must nurse her child: Gregorio is forced to fetch the baby and bring it to her, hidden under his cloak. Leonarda, an old servant in the household, informs the Marquis of her suspicions; he discovers Gilda, but is convinced she must be the tutor's lover. In the tempestuous scene that follows, involving all the characters, the truth finally comes out. The Marquis realizes his error, and decides to entrust his younger son, Pippetto, to Enrico, so that he might help him learn "the ways of the world."

== Recordings ==
Year	Cast: Madame Gilda Talemanni, Il Marchese Enrico, Il Marchese Giulio Antiquati, Don Gregorio Cordebono	Conductor, Opera house and orchestra	Label
1963	Plinio Clabassi, Ugo Benelli, Cecelia Fusco, Manlio Rocchi	Franco Ferrara, Orchestra Filarmonica di Roma (first release)	Enterprise/Palladio; Cat: ?
1984	Luciana Serra, Paolo Barbacini, Alessandro Corbelli, Enzo Dara	Bruno Campanella, Teatro Regio di Torino Orchestra and Chorus	CD: Warner Fonit; Cat: 3984 29178-2
2007	Elizaveta Martirosyan, Giorgio Trucco, Giorgio Valerio, Paolo Bordogna	Stefano Montanari, Orchestra and Chorus of the Bergamo Musica Festival Gaetano Donizetti (Recorded at performances at the Teatro Donizetti in Bergamo, 2–4 November)	DVD: Dynamic; Cat: 33579
2025	Caterina Dellaere, Alex Esposito, Alessandro Corbelli, Hana Lee	Vincenzo Milletarì, Donizetti Opera Orchestra, Donizetti Opera Choir	DVD: Naxos Cat: 8.660565-66
