= Don Gregorio (opera) =

Opera by Gaetano Donizetti

- Opera by Gaetano Donizetti
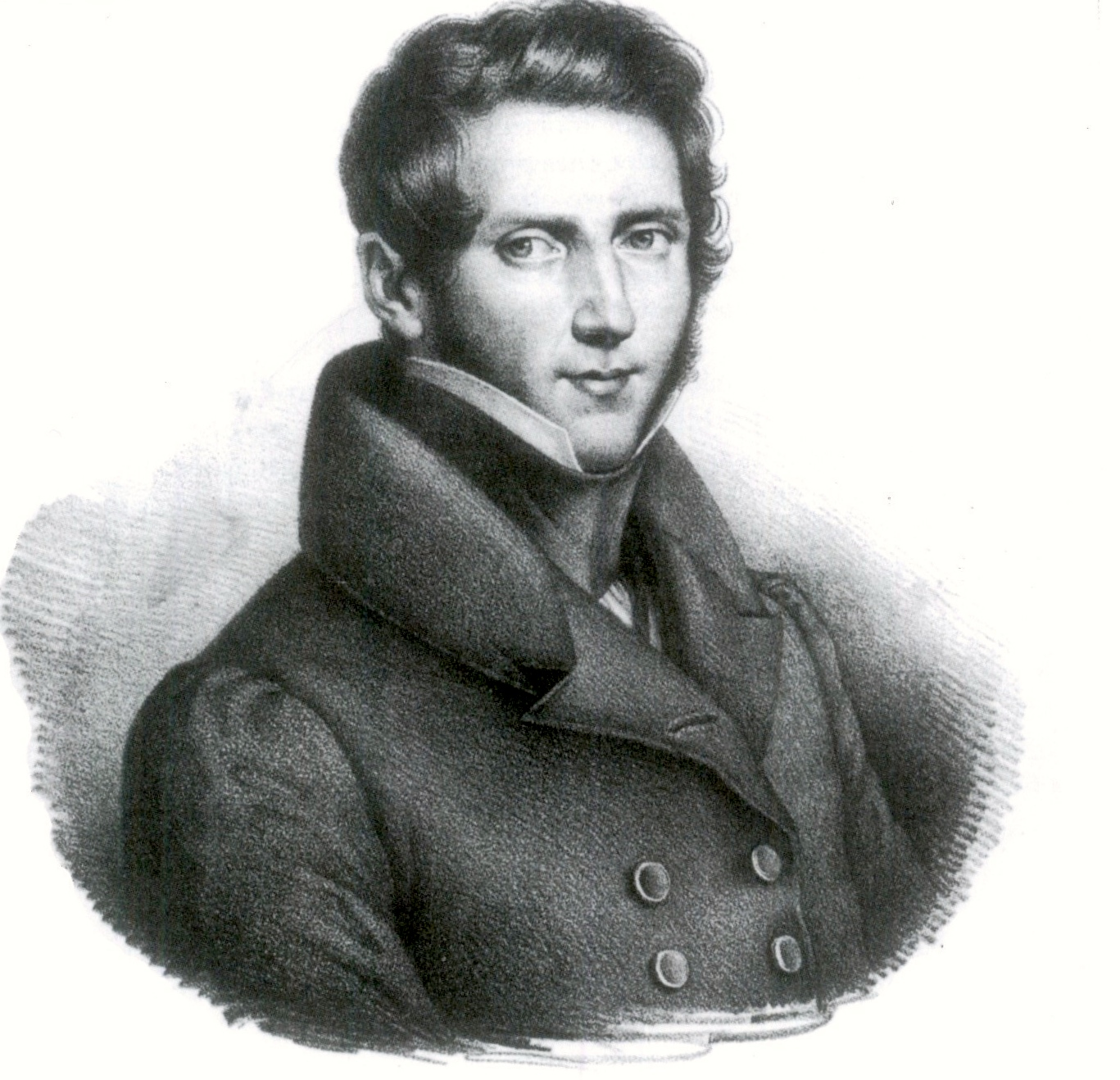
- The young composer
- Librettist: Jacopo Ferretti
- Language: Italian
- Based on: Donizetti's L'ajo nell'imbarazzo
- Premiere: 11 June 1826; Teatro Nuovo, Naples

Don Gregorio is an 1826 opera by Gaetano Donizetti from a libretto by Jacopo Ferretti and adapted from his popular 1824 opera buffa L'ajo nell'imbarazzo (The Tutor Embarrassed), which had enjoyed considerable success when presented at the Teatro Valle in Rome on 4 February 1824.

When Francesco Tortoli was interested in producing it in Naples, it was determined that L'ajo nell'imbarazzo was unsuitable as it stood. Donizetti then signed a contract with Tortoli for 300 ducats to adapt it into a new opera, Don Gregorio, and to compose one further opera. For the adaptation, Donizetti composed some additional music, revised the recitatives into spoken dialogue, and translated the role of Don Gregorio into the Neapolitan dialect. The opera premiered at the Teatro Nuovo on 11 June 1826.

== Performance history ==
19th century

Having been given under its original title, Donizetti revisions became Don Gregorio, and with that name, it premiered at the Teatro Nuovo. That same year, it also was given at La Scala and many Italian theatres. On 28 July 1846 it was first given in London, but "seems to have disappeared from view until it turned up again in Italy in the twentieth century". However, under one or other of its names, the opera was presented as late as 1866 in Milan and 1879 in Venice.

20th century and beyond

Don Gregorio was presented at the Teatro Donizetti in the composer's home town of Bergamo in 1959 and an Italian TV production was broadcast in 1964. It was not until 1980 that it appeared in New York.

A successful staging of L'ajo nell'imbarazzo by the Wexford Festival in 1973 led to that opera appearing in four additional European cities between 1975 and 1990, and in 2006, Wexford staged Don Gregorio, based on the new critical edition by Maria Chiara Bertieri.

Don Gregorio was then revived in Bergamo, Fano and Catania, with Paolo Bordogna in the title role and directed for the stage by Roberto Recchia. A new video recording was made from live performances given by the Teatro Donizetti in November 2007.

== Roles ==
Roles, voice types, premiere cast
Role	Voice type	Premiere cast, 11 June 1826
Don Gregorio	bass	
Gilda	soprano	
Leonarda	mezzo-soprano	
Marchese Enrico	tenor	
Don Giulio Antiquati	baritone	
Marchese Pippetto	tenor	

== Synopsis ==
See L'ajo nell'imbarazzo § Synopsis

== Recordings ==
Year	Cast: Gregorio Cordebono, Gilda Tallemanni, Leonarda, Marchese Enrico, Don Giulio Antiquati, Marchese Pippetto	Conductor, Opera House and Orchestra, Creative team	Label
2007	Paolo Bordogna, Elizaveta Martirosyan, Alessandra Fratelli, Giorgio Trucco, Giorgio Valerio, Livio Scarpellini	Stefano Montanari, Chorus and Orchestra of the Bergamo Gaetano Donizetti Music Festival. Roberto Recchia, stage director. Ferdia Murphy, set and costume designer. (Recorded at performances at the Donizetti Music Festival, 2–4 November)	DVD: Dynamic; Cat: 33579

== See also ==
- List of operas performed at the Wexford Festival
