= Flora mirabilis =

- Opera by Spyros Samaras
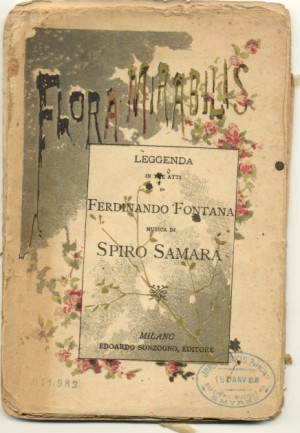
- Libretto published by Sonzogno in 1887
- Librettist: Ferdinando Fontana
- Language: Italian
- Premiere: 16 May 1886; Teatro Carcano, Milan

Flora mirabilis ("The Wondrous Flower") is an opera in three acts composed by Spyros Samaras to an Italian-language libretto by Ferdinando Fontana. Described in the libretto as a Legenda ("Legend"), the opera is an allegorical fairy tale set in medieval Sweden. It premiered at the Teatro Carcano in Milan on 16 May 1886 and was performed again the following year at La Scala. Flora mirabilis was Samara's first opera to be performed outside his native Greece and proved to be his greatest success, playing in multiple opera houses in Italy and abroad.

== Background ==
A 20th-century description of Flora mirabilis in Gelli's Dizionario dell'Opera points out that despite having a Greek composer trained in France and a story set in medieval Sweden, the opera adhered quite strictly to the characteristic elements of late 19th-century Italian opera—folkloric dances, large choruses, and lengthy orchestral passages used to set both the geographical and the psychological atmosphere.

Flora mirabilis was Samaras's first collaboration with the Italian librettist Ferdinando Fontana who became a lifelong admirer of his music and went on to provide the libretti for Samaras's operas Medgè (1888) and Lionella (1891). George Leotsakos and other authors have compared the musical idiom and proto-verismo displayed in Flora to that of Puccini whose first two operas, Le Villi and Edgar, also had libretti by Fontana. Like Flora, Le Villi and Edgar were based on northern European medieval legends, a particular passion of Fontana's.

== Performance history ==
The premiere of Flora mirabilis at the Teatro Carcano in May 1886 proved to be a great success with both the composer and the librettist brought to the stage for multiple curtain calls. The lead roles of Lidia and Valdo were sung by Ernestina Bendazzi-Secchi and her future husband Alfonso Garulli. Flora mirabilis was performed the following year at La Scala conducted by Franco Faccio and ran for 11 performances with Garulli reprising the role of Valdo and Emma Calvé as Lidia. The opera was subsequently performed in multiple Italian opera houses as well as in Cologne and Vienna. The opera's premiere in Samaras' native Greece took place in Corfu on 5 February 1889. It was also performed in Athens later that year during the celebrations for the wedding of Crown Prince Constantine, receiving a total of 16 performances there.

The full score to Flora mirabilis was lost in 1943 when Samaras's publisher Casa Sonzogno was hit during the Allied bombing of Milan. However, copies of the piano/vocal score are extant as are some orchestral fragments. Although largely forgotten in modern times, the opera was revived in 1979 in a production by the Greek National Opera at the Olympia Theatre in Athens. Its most famous melody, "Dance of the Flowers" was performed on its own at a concert conducted by Samaras himself for the 1896 Olympics in Athens and was performed again in 2011 by the Philharmonic Society of Corfu as part of the commemorations for the 150th anniversary of Samaras's birth.

== Roles ==
Role	Voice type	Premiere cast, 16 May 1886 (Conductor: Cleofonte Campanini)
Il Principe Cristiano d'Orèbro	bass	Osvaldo Bottero
Lidia, his daughter	soprano	Ernestina Bendazzi-Secchi
Il Conte d'Adelfiord	baritone	Alfonso Felici
Valdo	tenor	Alfonso Garulli
Valdo and Principe d'Orèbro's squires, Lidia's ladies-in-waiting, woodsmen, flowers
