= Ada Adini =

American opera singer (1855–1924)

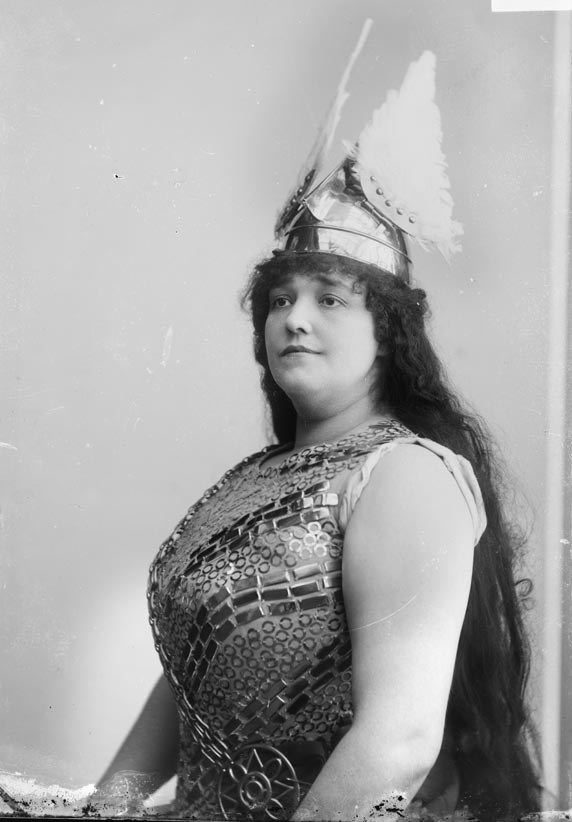
- Adini as the valkyrie Brünnhilde in Wagner's Die Walküre
- Born: Adele Schillinger; 1 March 1856; Boston, US
- Died: 22 February 1924 (aged 67); Dieppe or Paris, France
- Burial place: Auteuil cemetery, Paris
- Occupation: Opera soprano

Ada Adini or Adiny (1 March 1856 – February 1924) was an American operatic soprano who had an active international career from 1876 up into the first decade of the 20th century. She possessed a large, expressive voice which enabled her to sing a broad range of roles that extended from the coloratura soprano repertoire to dramatic soprano parts. She made five recordings with Fonotipia Records in Paris in 1905.

== Life and career ==
Born Adele Schillinger in Boston to Elizabeth Doane, née Chapman (Boston, 31 January 1839 – 22 October 1863, Florence), and Franklin Benjamin Schillinger, Adini studied singing with Giovanni Sbriglia and Pauline Viardot in Paris. She married the Spanish tenor Antonio Aramburo while studying in Paris. She made her professional opera debut in 1876 at the opera house in Varese, Italy, in the title role of Giacomo Meyerbeer's Dinorah. She was then active with James Henry Mapleson's company in New York City, making her debut with the company in 1879 as Gilda in Giuseppe Verdi's Rigoletto at the Academy of Music with Aramburo as the Duke of Mantua. She was later heard with the company as Leonora in Verdi's Il trovatore to her husband's Manrico.

In 1882 she joined Bartolomeo Merelli's traveling opera troupe with whom she performed in Berlin (1882) and Prague (1883). From 1887–1890 she was committed to the Palais Garnier where she notably created the role of the Duchesse d'Étampes in the world premiere of Camille Saint-Saëns' Ascanio (1890).

In 1893 Adini sang Brünnhilde in the Italian premiere of Richard Wagner's Die Walküre at La Scala. She later repeated the role at the Teatro Regio di Torino (1898) and the Teatro Costanzi (1899) in Rome. In 1894 and 1897 she sang at the Royal Opera House in London as Donna Anna in Wolfgang Amadeus Mozart's Don Giovanni. She sang the role of Frédegonde in the world premiere of César Franck's Ghiselle at the Opéra de Monte-Carlo in 1896.

Her second husband was the opera librettist and writer Paul Milliet. He wrote the libretto for Jules Massenet's Hérodiade in which she sang the role of Salomé in Monte-Carlo in 1903 with Emma Calvé in the title role. Some of the other roles Adini performed on stage were Anita in La Navarraise, Brunehild in Sigurd, Catherine of Aragon in Henry VIII, Charlotte in Werther, Chimène in Le Cid, Countess Almaviva in The Marriage of Figaro, Desdemona in Otello, Isolde in Tristan und Isolde, Rachel in La Juive, Sélika in L'Africaine, Simonetta in I Medici, Valentine in Les Huguenots, and Venus in Tannhäuser.

After retiring from the stage Adini was active as a singing teacher. One of her notable pupils was the Spanish mezzo-soprano Maria Gay. According to Cummings (2008), she died in Dieppe, France, in 1924; the registry of the 16th arrondissement of Paris records her death In Paris on 22 February 1924. The registry gives her birth name as Schillinger, as does Kurt Gänzl (Chapman was her mother's maiden name), but he also gives Dieppe. Opera commentator Michael Scott summarises her career and evaluates her recordings in The Record of Singing (Duckworth, London, 1977).
