= Mademoiselle de Belle-Isle (opera) =

Mademoiselle de Belle-Isle is a 1905 opera by Spyridon Samaras to a French-language libretto by Paul Milliet based on the 1839 play by Alexandre Dumas. The opera was however premiered in Italian at Genoa with a new Italian text by Amintore Galli.

== Recording ==
- Mademoiselle de Belle-Isle (French version) Angelo Simos, Tassis Christoyannis, Pavlos Maropoulos, Pantelis Kontos, Kaval Choir of Sofia, Pazardzhik Symphony Orchestra, Byron Fidetzis Naxos 2CD 2020
