= Anna Bolena =

1830 opera by Gaetano Donizetti

- Opera by Gaetano Donizetti
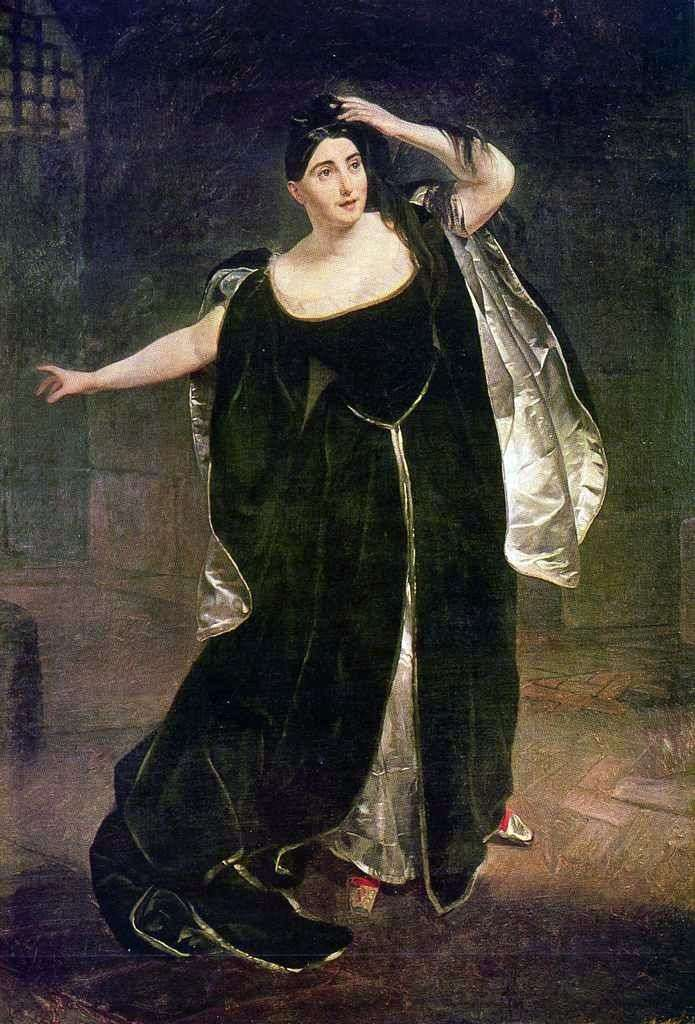
- Giuditta Pasta in the title role
- Librettist: Felice Romani
- Language: Italian
- Premiere: 26 December 1830; Teatro Carcano, Milan

Anna Bolena is a tragic opera (tragedia lirica) in two acts composed by Gaetano Donizetti. Felice Romani wrote the Italian libretto after Ippolito Pindemonte's Enrico VIII ossia Anna Bolena and Alessandro Pepoli's Anna Bolena, both recounting the life of Anne Boleyn, the second wife of England's King Henry VIII.

It is one of four operas by Donizetti dealing with the Tudor period in English history—in composition order, Il castello di Kenilworth (1829), Anna Bolena (1830), Maria Stuarda (named for Mary, Queen of Scots, it appeared in different forms in 1834 and 1835), and Roberto Devereux (1837, named for a putative lover of Queen Elizabeth I of England). The leading female characters of the latter three operas are often referred to as "the Three Donizetti Queens."

Anna Bolena premiered on 26 December 1830 at the Teatro Carcano in Milan, to "overwhelming success." Weinstock notes that only after this success did Donizetti's teacher, Johann Simon Mayr, "address his former pupil as Maestro." The composer had begun "to emerge as one of three most luminous names in the world of Italian opera", alongside Bellini and Rossini.

== Performance history ==
19th century

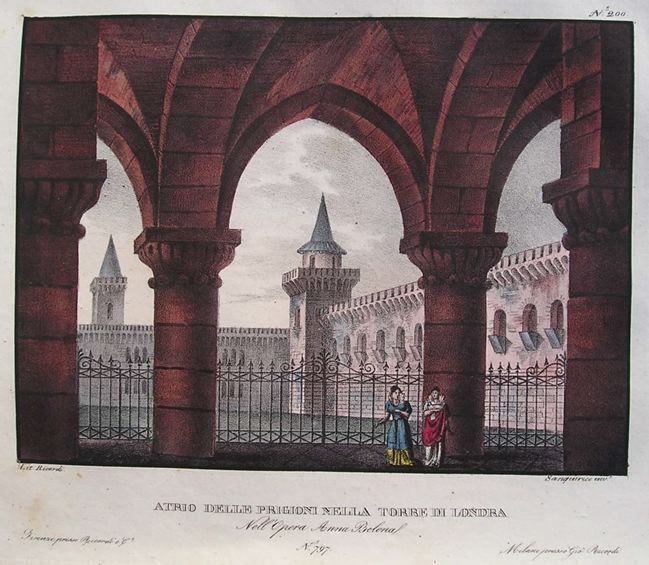
Set design by Alessandro Sanquirico for the 1830 premiere

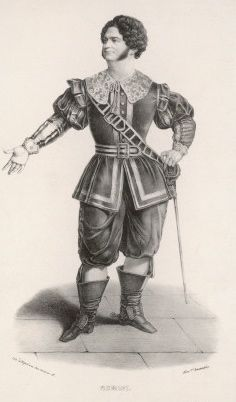
Rubini as Lord Percy in Anna Bolena

After its opening performances in Italy in 1830, Anna Bolena was first given in London at the King's Theatre on 8 July 1831. Its first US performance was given in French (as Anne de Boulen) in New Orleans, at the Théâtre d'Orléans on 12 November 1839. The New York premiere of the opera, and the first Italian presentation of the work in the United States, took place at the Astor Opera House on January 7, 1850, with conductor Max Maretzek and Apollonia Bertucca in the title role. It appears to have been presented in Europe, up to 1850, in 25 cities and then again in 1881 in Livorno. After the rise of verismo, it was performed infrequently.

20th century and beyond

Rarely seen in the first half of the 20th century, it was revived more frequently after World War II. On 30 December 1947, the opera was performed at Gran Teatre del Liceu in Barcelona, to mark that theatre's centennial (it had opened in 1847 with Anna Bolena). The cast was Sara Scuderi as Anna, Giulietta Simionato as Jane Seymour and Cesare Siepi as Henry VIII. In April 1957, the opera was revived at La Scala for Maria Callas (one of the seven performances was recorded) in a lavish production directed by Luchino Visconti, with Giulietta Simionato as Jane Seymour. It proved to be one of Callas' greatest triumphs. In the revival the following year, Callas and Simionato repeated their roles and were joined by Siepi as the king, this role having been sung by Nicola Rossi-Lemeni at the premiere the year before.

Since its 1850 performance, the opera was not performed again in the United States until it was presented in a concert version by the American Opera Society in October 1957 with Gloria Davy the title role and Simionato as Giovanna Seymour for performances at both Town Hall and Carnegie Hall. On 26 June 1959, the Santa Fe Opera mounted the first fully staged production of the work since 1839. Several famous modern sopranos have lent their voices to the role, including Leyla Gencer, Montserrat Caballé, Marisa Galvany, Renata Scotto, Edita Gruberova and Mariella Devia. In the 1970s, Beverly Sills earned a considerable degree of fame when she appeared in all three of Donizetti's "Tudor" operas at the New York City Opera. (She also made studio recordings of all three operas.) And Anna was one of the last new roles performed by Dame Joan Sutherland, at San Francisco Opera in 1984.

While not yet part of the "standard repertory", Anna Bolena is increasingly performed today, and there are several recordings.

It was presented by the Dallas Opera in November 2010, which has also staged Maria Stuarda. The Minnesota Opera presented Anna Bolena as part of the "Three Queens" trilogy. The Vienna State Opera gave it in the Spring of 2011, with Anna Netrebko in the title role and Elīna Garanča as Giovanna Seymour. New York's Metropolitan Opera mounted it for the first time in September 2011, opening the company's 2011–2012 season, with Netrebko and with David McVicar directing. Opera Seria UK in Manchester, England, staged Anna Bolena in 2012 as the first in their "Tudor Queens" trilogy, which continues into 2014. And the Welsh National Opera presented the trilogy between September and November 2013, in many different venues in Britain. The Lyric Opera of Chicago also included Anna Bolena in their 2014–2015 season. Sondra Radvanovsky has sung the title role at several opera houses including the Met in 2015.

== Roles ==
Role	Voice type	Premiere Cast, 26 December 1830 (Conductor: - )
Anna Bolena (Anne Boleyn)	soprano	Giuditta Pasta
Enrico (Henry VIII)	bass	Filippo Galli
Giovanna Seymour (Jane Seymour), Anna's lady-in-waiting	mezzo-soprano	Elisa Orlandi
Lord Rochefort (George Boleyn), Anna's brother	bass	Lorenzo Biondi
Riccardo Percy (Henry Percy, 6th Earl of Northumberland)	tenor	Giovanni Battista Rubini
Smeton (Mark Smeaton), musician	contralto	Henriette Laroche
Hervey, court official	tenor	Antonio Crippa
Courtiers, soldiers, huntsmen

== Synopsis ==
Time: 1536
Place: Windsor and London

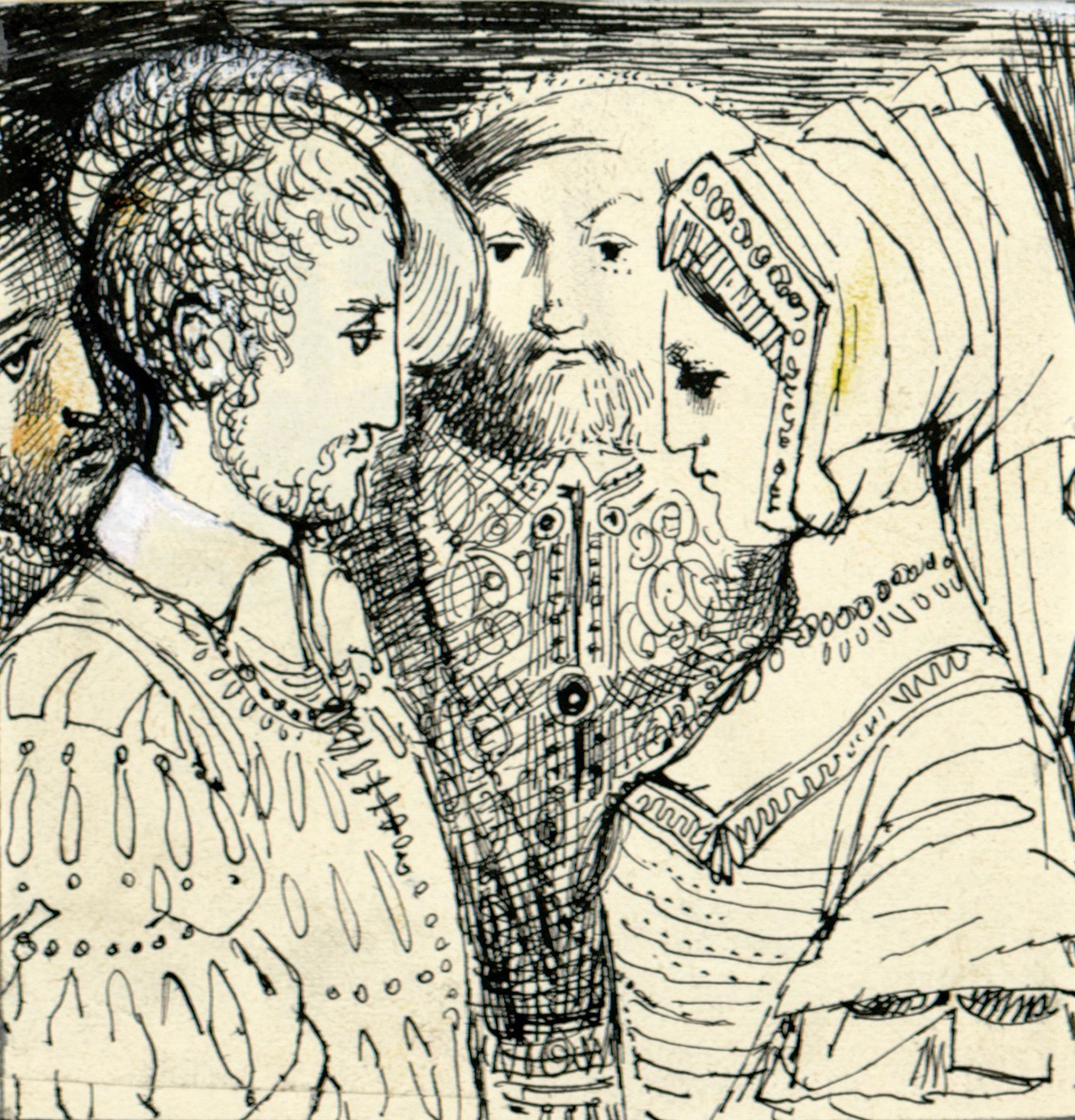
Disegno per copertina di libretto, drawing for Anna Bolena (undated).

=== Act 1 ===
Scene One: Night. Windsor Castle, Queen's apartments

Courtiers comment that the queen's star is setting, because the king's fickle heart burns with another love.

Jane Seymour enters to attend a call by the Queen; Anna enters and notes that people seem sad. The queen admits to Jane that she is troubled. At the queen's request, her page Smeaton plays the harp and sings in an attempt to cheer the people present. The queen asks him to stop. Unheard by any one else, she says to herself that the ashes of her first love are still burning, and that she is now unhappy in her vain splendor. All leave, except Jane.

Henry VIII enters and tells Jane that soon she will have no rival, that the altar has been prepared for her, and that she will have husband, sceptre, and throne. Each leaves by a different door.

Scene Two: Day. Around Windsor Castle

Lord Rochefort, Anna's brother, is surprised to meet Lord Richard Percy, who has been called back to England from exile by Henry VIII. Percy asks if it is true that the Queen is unhappy and that the King has changed. Rochefort answers that love is never content.

Hunters enter. Percy is agitated at the prospect of possibly seeing Anna, who was his first love. Henry and Anna enter and express surprise at seeing Percy. Henry does not allow Percy to kiss his hand, but says that Anna has given him assurances of Percy's innocence but she still has feelings for Percy. Henry VIII tells Hervey, an officer of the king, to spy on every step and every word of Anna and Percy.

Scene Three: Windsor Castle, close to the Queen's apartments

Smeaton takes a locket from his breast containing Anna's portrait. He has stolen it and has come to return it. He hears a sound and hides behind a screen. Anna and Rochefort enter. Rochefort asks Anna to hear Percy. Then he leaves. Smeaton peeps out from behind the screen, but cannot escape. Percy enters. Percy says that he sees that Anna is unhappy. She tells him that the king now loathes her. Percy says that he still loves her. Anna tells him not to speak to her of love. Before leaving, Percy asks whether he can see Anna again. She says no. He draws his sword to stab himself, and Anna screams. In the mistaken belief that Percy is attacking Anna, Smeaton rushes out from behind the screen. Smeaton and Percy are about to fight. Anna faints, and Rochefort rushes in. Just then, Henry VIII enters and sees the unsheathed swords. Summoning attendants, he says that these persons have betrayed their king. Smeaton says that it is not true, and tears open his tunic to offer his breast to the king for slaying if he is lying. The locket with Anna's portrait falls at the king's feet. The king snatches it up. He orders that the offenders be dragged to dungeons. Anna says to herself that her fate is sealed.

=== Act 2 ===
Scene One: London. Antechamber of the Queen's apartments

The guards note that even Jane Seymour has stayed away from Anna. Anna enters with a retinue of ladies, who tell her to place her trust in heaven. Hervey enters and says that the Council of Peers has summoned the ladies into its presence. The ladies leave with Hervey. Jane enters and says that Anna can avoid being put to death by admitting guilt. Anna says that she will not buy her life with infamy. She expresses the hope that her successor will wear a crown of thorns. Jane admits that she is to be the successor. Anna tells her to leave, but says that Henry VIII alone is the guilty one. Jane leaves, deeply upset.

Scene Two: Antechamber leading into the hall where the Council of Peers is meeting

Hervey tells courtiers that Anna is lost, because Smeaton has talked and has revealed a crime. Henry VIII enters. Hervey says that Smeaton has fallen into the trap. Henry VIII tells Hervey to continue to let Smeaton believe that he has saved Anna's life. Anna and Percy are brought in, separately. Henry VIII says that Anna has had sex with the page Smeaton, and that there are witnesses. He says that both Anna and Percy will die. Percy says that it is written in heaven that he and Anna are married. They are led away by guards.

Jane enters. She says that she does not want to be the cause of Anna's death. Henry VIII says that she will not save Anna by leaving. Hervey enters and says that the council has dissolved the royal marriage and has condemned Anna and her accomplices to death. Courtiers and Jane ask the king to be merciful. He tells them to leave.

Scene Three: Tower of London

Percy and Rochefort are together in their cell. Hervey enters and says that the king has pardoned them. They ask about Anna. Hearing that she is to be executed, they choose to be executed also. They leave, surrounded by guards.

In Anna's cell, a chorus of ladies comment on her madness and grief. Anna enters, she imagines that it is her wedding day to the king. Then she imagines that she sees Percy, and she asks him to take her back to her childhood home (Donizetti used the theme from the English/American song Home Sweet Home as part of Anna's Mad Scene to underscore her longing). Percy, Rochefort and Smeaton are brought in. Smeaton throws himself at Anna's feet and says that he accused her in the belief that he was saving her life. In her delirium, Anna asks him why he is not playing his lute. Cannon fire sounds and Anna regains her senses. She is told that Giovanna and Enrico are being acclaimed by the populace on their wedding day. Anna says she does not wish vengeance on them. She faints. Guards enter to lead the prisoners to the block.

== Recordings ==
Year	Anna Bolena Enrico Giovanna Percy	Conductor, Opera House and Orchestra	Label
1957	Maria Callas, Nicola Rossi-Lemeni, Giulietta Simionato, Gianni Raimondi	Gianandrea Gavazzeni, Orchestra and Chorus of La Scala, Milan (Recorded live on 14 April)	CD: EMI; Cat: CDMB 5 66474-2
1958	Leyla Gencer, Plinio Clabassi, Giulietta Simionato, Aldo Bertocci	Gianandrea Gavazzeni, Orchestra Sinfonica e Coro della RAI di Milano	CD: Andromeda; Cat: ANDRCD 5114
1965	Leyla Gencer, Carlo Cava, Patricia Johnson, Juan Oncina	Gianandrea Gavazzeni, Glyndebourne Festival, London Philharmonic Orchestra, Glyndebourne Festival Chorus (Recorded live on 13 June)	CD: Hunt; Cat: CD 554
1967	Teresa Żylis-Gara, Karl Ridderbusch, Vera Little; Gene Ferguson	Alberto Erede, Orchester und Chor des Westdeutschen Rundfunks Cologne	CD: Opera Depot; Cat: OD 10388-2
1968/69	Elena Souliotis, Nicolai Ghiaurov, Marilyn Horne, John Alexander	Silvio Varviso, Vienna State Opera Orchestra and Chorus	CD: Decca; Cat: 455 069-2
1972	Beverly Sills, Paul Plishka, Shirley Verrett, Stuart Burrows	Julius Rudel, London Symphony Orchestra; John Alldis Choir	CD: DG Westminster Legacy; Cat: 471 217-2
1975	Renata Scotto, Samuel Ramey, Susanne Marsee, Stanley Kolk	Julius Rudel, Opera Company of Philadelphia (Recorded "live" on December 16)	CD: Opera Depot; Cat: 11399-2
1984	Joan Sutherland, James Morris, Judith Forst, Michael Myers	Richard Bonynge, Orchestra and Chorus of the Canadian Opera Company	DVD: VAI; Cat: 4203
1987	Dame Joan Sutherland, Samuel Ramey, Susanne Mentzer, Jerry Hadley	Richard Bonynge, Orchestra and Chorus of the Welsh National Opera	CD: Decca; Cat: 421 096-2
1994	Edita Gruberova, Stefano Palatchi, Delores Ziegler, Jose Bros	Elio Boncompagni, Hungarian Radio Chorus and Orchestra	CD: Nightingale Classics; Cat: NCO 070565-2
2006	Dimitra Theodossiou, Riccardo Zanellato, Sofia Soloviy, Gianluca Pasolini	Fabrizio Maria Carminati, Orchestra and Chorus of the Bergamo Musica Festival Gaetano Donizetti (Recorded at Teatro Donizetti in October)	DVD: Dynamic; Cat: 33534
2011	Anna Netrebko, Ildebrando D'Arcangelo, Elīna Garanča, Francesco Meli	Evelino Pidò, Orchestra and Chorus of the Vienna State Opera	DVD: Deutsche Grammophon; DDD 0440 073 4725 6 GH2
2011	Anna Netrebko, Ildar Abdrazakov, Ekaterina Gubanova, Stephen Costello	Marco Armiliato, Metropolitan Opera Orchestra and Chorus (Production: David McVicar)	HD video: Met Opera on Demand
2016	Sondra Radvanovsky, Ildar Abdrazakov, Milijana Nikolic, Stephen Costello	Marco Armiliato, Metropolitan Opera Orchestra and Chorus	Streaming audio: Met Opera on Demand

== See also ==
- Anne Boleyn in popular culture
