= Paul Milliet =

French playwright and librettist

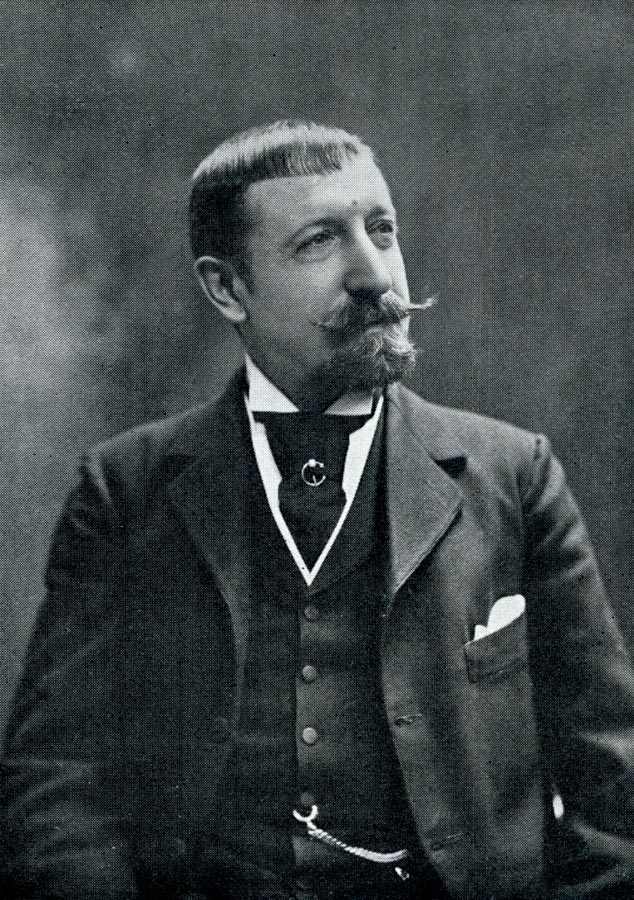
- Born: 14 February 1848; Rio de Janeiro
- Died: 21 November 1924 (aged 76); Paris, France
- Occupations: Playwright; Writer; Librettist
- Spouse: Ada Adini

Paul Milliet (14 February 1848 – 21 November 1924) was a French playwright and librettist of the Parisian Belle Époque.

His opera librettos include Jules Massenet's Hérodiade (1881) and Werther (1892), Alfred Bruneau's Kérim (1887), Spyridon Samaras's La biondinetta (1903), Mademoiselle de Belle Isle (1905) and Rhea (1908) and Camille Erlanger's Forfaiture (1921). He was married to soprano Ada Adini.

== Works ==
Opera

- 1881: Hérodiade, opera in 4 acts and 7 tableaux, with Henri Grémont, music by Jules Massenet, Brussels, La Monnaie, 19 December
- 1883: Mathias Corvin, one-act opéra comique, with Jules Levallois, music by Sándor Bertha, Paris, Théâtre de l'Opéra-Comique
- 1887: Nadia, one-act opéra comique, music by Jules Bordier, Opéra-Populaire, 25 May
- 1887: Kérim, three-act drame lyrique, music by Alfred Bruneau, Théâtre du Château d'Eau, 9 June
- 1891: Néron, pantomime in 3 acts, music by Édouard Lalo, Hippodrome au pont de l'Alma, 28 March.
- 1892: Werther, drame lyrique in 4 acts and 5 tableaux, after Johann Wolfgang von Goethe, with Édouard Blau and Georges Hartmann, music by Jules Massenet, Wiener Staatsoper, 16 February
- 1895: Amy Robsart, opera in 3 acts and 4 tableaux, en prose rythmée, after Walter Scott, with Augustus Harris, music by Isidore de Lara, London, Drury Lane
- 1896: André Chénier, historical drama in 4 tableaux, by Luigi Illica, French version by Paul Milliet, Milan, La Scala
- 1898: Cavalleria rusticana, drame lyrique in 2 acts, by Giovanni Targioni Tozzetti and Guido Menasci, French version by Paul Milliet, music by Pietro Mascagni
- 1899: Le Duc de Ferrare, drame lyrique, music by Georges Marty, Théâtre de la Renaissance, 30 May
- 1900: Martin et Martine, Flemish tale in 3 acts, music by Émile Trépard, Théâtre de la Renaissance, 6 February
- 1901: Chopin, opera in 4 acts compose by Giacomo Orefice on melodies by Frédéric Chopin, poem by Angiolo Orvieto, French version by Paul Milliet
- 1902: Adriana Lecouvreur, comédie-drame by Eugène Scribe and Ernest Legouvé shortened to 4 acts by Arturo Colautti, French version by Paul Milliet, music by Francesco Cilea
- 1903: Storia d’amore o La biondinetta, opéra, music by Spyros Samaras, Milan, Teatro Lirico Internazionale
- 1904: Le Réveil du Bouddha, mystère lyrique in 3 episodes, music by Isidore de Lara, Gand, Théâtre Royal, 1 December
- 1905: Mademoiselle de Belle-Isle, drame lyrique in 4 acts, music by Spyros Samaras, Genoa, Teatro Politeama
- 1908: Rhea, drame musical in 3 parts, music by Spyros Samaras, Florence, Teatro Verdi
- 1911: Sibéria, drame lyrique in 3 acts, by Luigi Illica, French version by Paul Milliet, Opéra Garnier, 9 June
- 1912: Le Cobzar, drame lyrique in 2 acts, with Hélène Vacaresco, music by Gabrielle Ferrari, Opéra Garnier, 30 March
- 1913: Le Château de la Bretèche, drame lyrique in 4 acts and 5 tableaux, after the short story by Balzac, with Jacques Dor, music by Albert Dupuis, Nice, Opéra, 28 March
- 1913: La vida breve, poem in 2 acts and 4 tableaux, by Carlos Fernández Shaw, French version by Paul Milliet, music by Manuel de Falla, Casino municipal de Nice, 1 April
- 1913: Le Drapeau, patriotic tale in 2 acts, after the short story by Jules Claretie, music by Charles Pons, Paris, Théâtre de la Gaîté-Lyrique, 1913
- 1921: Forfaiture, musical comedy in 5 episodes, after the film by Hector Turnbill, with André de Lorde, music by Camille Erlanger, Théâtre de l'Opéra-Comique, 9 February
- 1930: La Grand'mère, comédie lyrique in 2 acts, after Victor Hugo, music by Charles Silver, Théâtre de l'Opéra-Comique, 7 October

Theatre

- 1885: Le Roi de l'argent, five-act drama, Théâtre de l'Ambigu, 13 November
- 1904: Electra, five-act play, by Benito Pérez Galdós, adaptation by Paul Milliet, Théâtre de la Porte-Saint-Martin, 20 May

Varia

- 1873: Notes romantiques à propos de Marion Delorme, preface by Alfred de Musset
- 1874: De l'origine du théâtre à Paris
- 1874: Premières poésies : Avril. Le Livre d'heures de l'amour. De tout un peu
- 1888: Chants français, lyrics and music collected by Paul Milliet, under the direction and with a preface by Paul Déroulède

== See also ==
- Félix Milliet
