= Il furioso all'isola di San Domingo =

Opera by Gaetano Donizetti

- Opera by Gaetano Donizetti
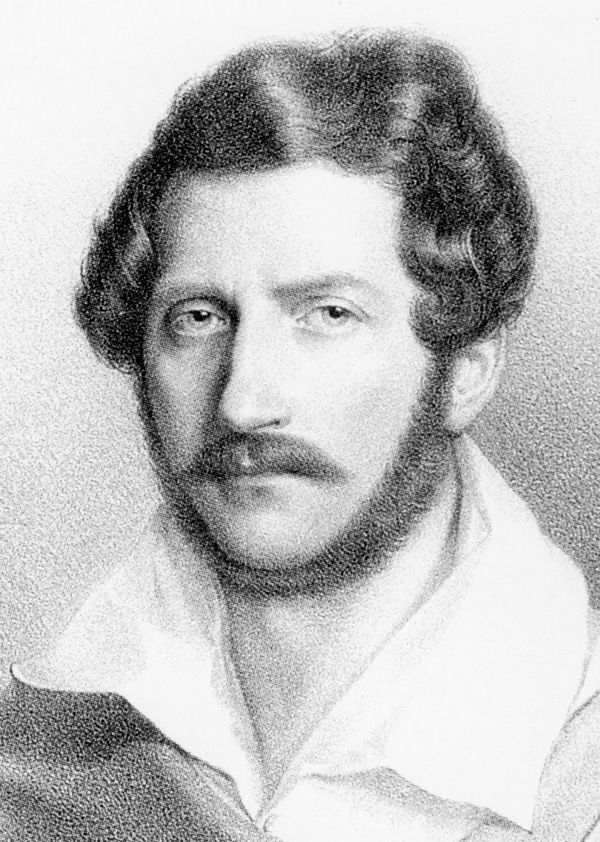
- Gaetano Donizetti c. 1835
- Librettist: Jacopo Ferretti
- Language: Italian
- Premiere: 2 January 1833; Teatro Valle, Rome

Il furioso all'isola di San Domingo (The Madman on the Island of San Domingo) is a "romantic melodramma" in two acts by the composer Gaetano Donizetti. Jacopo Ferretti, who since 1821 had written five libretti for Donizetti and two for Rossini (including La Cenerentola), had proposed the unusual subject and he was contracted to write the Italian libretto based on a five-act play of the same title by an unknown author in 1820, which "had been given in the same theatre [...] and which Donizetti had immediately loved". However, as has been noted by Charles Osborne, the "ultimate derivation of both play and libretto is an episode in part 1 of Don Quixote by Miguel de Cervantes's published in 1605" which is the story of Cardenio and Lucinda.

The opera was premiered at the Teatro Valle in Rome on 2 January 1833 and was very successful throughout Europe—being staged in over 100 locations—but it disappeared after 1889, not to be seen again until 1958.

== Composition history ==
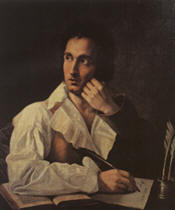
Jacopo Ferretti, Italian librettist and poet, 1784—1852

After completing L'elisir d'amore for Milan and being present for its first performance on 12 May 1832 where it was immediately successful, Donizetti and his wife, Virginia, left for Rome. Within a few weeks of his arrival, he had signed a contract to write Parisina for Florence and, for Rome, Il furioso with the librettist to be Ferretti. As Battaglia notes, for the composer:

It was the protagonist's drama that actually intrigued him: a man at last, after so many sorrowful female images on the brink of madness as innocent victims of the prejudices and cruelty of people. Now [it was] a man".

Then the couple moved on to a busy schedule in Naples, which included the preparation for what became Sancia di Castiglia for a November premiere.

The first installment of Il furioso's libretto arrived in August and the process of composition and modification began. With performances of Sancia over, the composer left for Rome with Furioso's first act and part of the second act completed. Much of the "discussion" between Donizetti and Ferretti had taken place by means of letters during the previous months (an unusual procedure for this composer, since he usually worked with the librettist present). Significantly, as Ashbrook points out, the composer "coins a maxim for Ferretti's benefit: "The good consists of making things small and beautiful, and not in singing a lot and being boring".

In the composition of this opera, one thing stands out: the power of the baritone, the 23-year-old Giorgio Ronconi for whom the two men were writing the role of Cardenio. Furioso is the first opera in which Donizetti has a baritone as the hero.

== Performance history ==
19th Century

Il furioso was subsequently presented at La Scala (October 1833 onward for 36 performances), the Teatro Regio di Parma and in Venice at the San Benedetto (both in 1834), the Teatro Comunale di Bologna (1835), the Teatro della Canobbiana (1835), the Teatro Nacional de São Carlos (1835), and the Teatro di San Carlo (1836) for a total of 70 presentations in other opera houses in Italy alone, as well as in at least 25 other European cities from Barcelona (May 1834) to Brussels (March 1844), including London on 17 December 1836.

However, as Martin Deasy points out, it was the 1834 performances in Naples which drew the most attention, noting that when presented in that city on 11 May, the opera:

burst upon Naples like a supernova, opening in three theatres on the same night...These simultaneous local premieres—a phenomenon unprecedented in Italy—caught the collective imagination, triggering an urban craze that swept the city for more than a fortnight [two weeks]: for few heady spring weeks, it seemed that all Naples could talk about was Il furioso.

He goes on to discuss the fact that frustration had built up during the immediate three-week period due to the closure of all the theatres in Naples for religious observances, including the Teatro San Carlo which was being renovated. Therefore, performances were given at the Teatro del Fondo, the Teatro Nuovo, and the Teatro Fenice. Donizetti rated the successes at the three houses: "at the Fondo—so-so; at the Nuovo, a great success; at the Fenice, just about nothing". With its evident popularity, the opera continued to be given into the 1840s.

Later in the century, it was given in Paris on 2 February 1862 at the Théâtre-Italien, where Ronconi triumphed, in Piacenza in the autumn of 1876, but after an 1889 revival in Trieste, it disappeared until 1958.

20th Century and beyond

Performances of the opera, which were all recorded, were given in Siena (September 1958), as part of the Spoleto Festival in Italy in July 1967, and in Savona in 1987. On 4 June 1978 it was given its US premiere by the American Spoleto Festival in South Carolina, followed by the first New York staging at the Brooklyn Academy of Music on 22 February 1979. In the fall of 1978, an Eastman Opera Theater production at the Eastman School of Music was directed by Richard Pearlman, supported by the Eastman Philharmonia under the direction of conductor David Effron (performances on 29 and 30 November and 1 and 2 December, 1978).

However, scholar William Ashbrook notes that much damage had been done to the score by the time it reached the United States: he complains of reduced orchestration, the score badly cut and re-arranged, and the buffo elements pulled out of proportion to disrupt "one of the most original aspects of Il Furioso – the way in which the comedy relates to and reinforces the serious plot."

Other performances took place in 1979: one in Washington, DC and the other in London in a concert performance presented by Pro Opera and the Donizetti Society on 25 November. Another took place in Philadelphia in 1982.

A review of a presentation in November 1987 at the Teatro Gabriello Chiabrera in Savona in Italy appeared in the Donizetti Society's Newsletter:

This hearing at Savona confirmed the belief that it is certainly the most integrated of his semiseria scores, where patter, instead of intruding, actually points-up the tragic dilemma of the crazy outcast who has taken to the jungle...[Donizetti's strengths include] a sequence of beguiling tunes, his delectable orchestration, sometimes echoing the voices, sometimes underpinning them, sometimes mocking them; his ability to paint a stage picture with two bars of music, supplying a deft touch to fleeting emotions while never losing sight (or sound) of the story itself, in this opera.

In September 2006, it was given at the Musiktheater im Revier, Gelsenkirchen, Germany. The Bergamo Opera Festival in Donizetti's home town presented the opera in October 2013.

== Roles ==
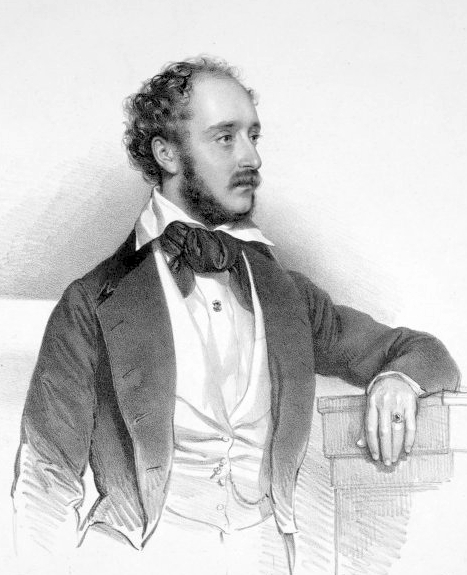
Lorenzo Salvi Litho by Josef Kriehuber

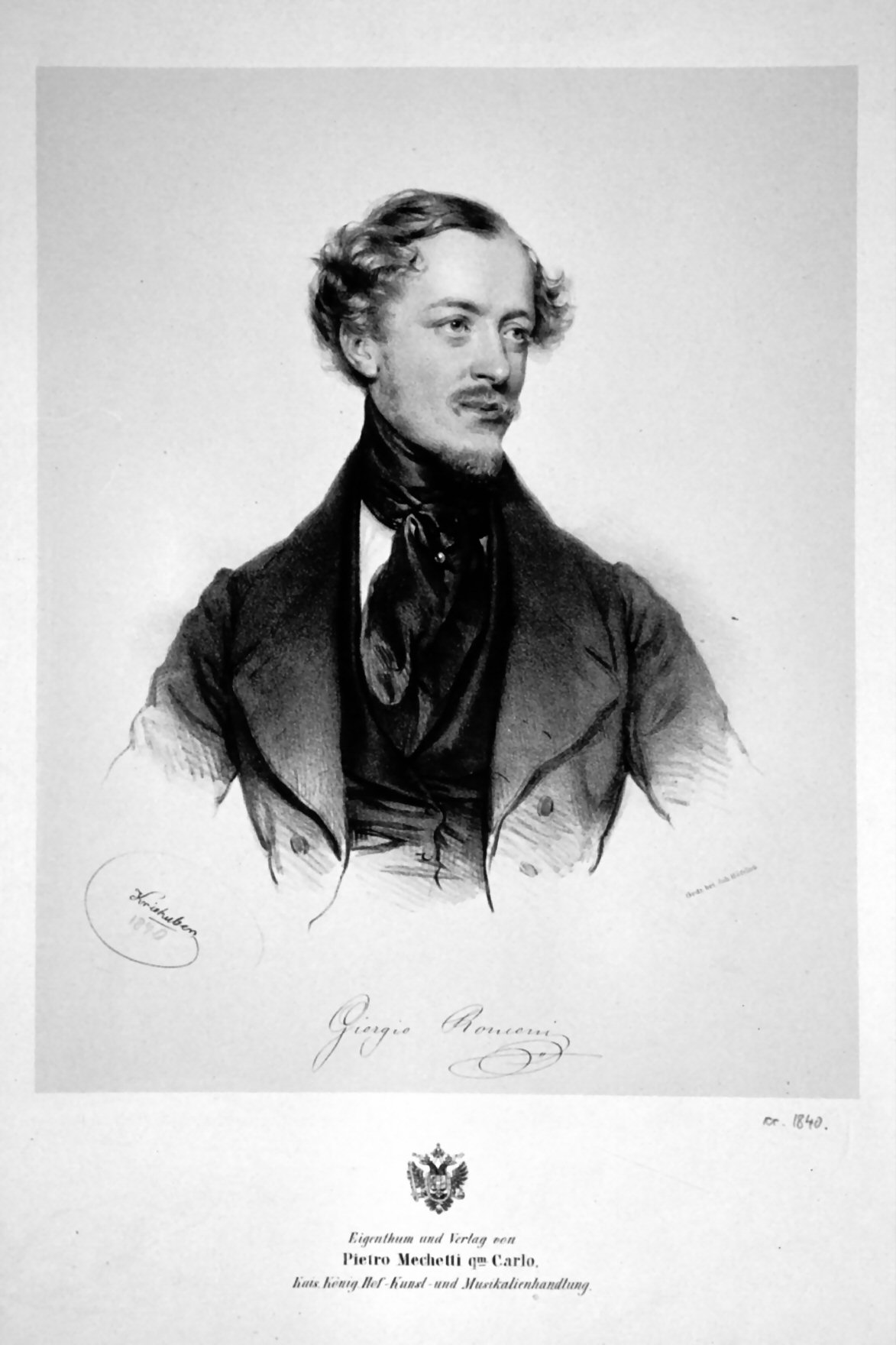
Giorgio Ronconi Litho by Josef Kriehuber, 1840

Role	Voice type	Premiere Cast, 2 January 1833 (Conductor: – )
Fernando, Cardenio's brother	tenor	Lorenzo Salvi
Eleonora, Cardenio's estranged wife	soprano	Elisa Orlandi
Cardenio	baritone	Giorgio Ronconi
Bartolomeo Mergoles	bass	Filippo Valentini
Marcella, Bartolomeo's daughter	soprano	Marianna Franceschini
Kaidamà, Bartolomeo's servant	bass	Ferdinando Lauretti

== Synopsis ==
Time: 16th Century
Place: An island in the West Indies

=== Act 1 ===
On the seashore of the island

Carrying a basket, Marcella emerges from her hut and observes the raging sea, expresses concern about "the raving one", and prepares to leave her basket of food under a bush for him: (Freme il mar lontan lontano / "The sea is agitated / I hear the thunder..."). Bartolomeo, her father, follows her. He roughly questions her motive and, while she offers the explanation that it is to observe the weather, he knows that she really has come to look for the "furious one". He discovers food hidden in the basket and, understanding that this is designed for the "madman", Cardenio, Bartolomeo describes the bizarre behavior of this man and despairs of the attraction which women seem to have in helping insane people: (So per chi. Sempre pietose / Fur la femmine con matti / "I know to whom. Women have always been pitiful to the insanes.") Marcella pleads with her father for help in order to protect him from himself.

Kaidamà, Bartolomeo's island native servant, joins the assembled islanders having been terrorized by Cardenio's madness, and he describes his experience of running away after being repeatedly hit. He continues to fear for his life, expressing his fear in an extensive aria that unless the people kill the madman, he will kill Kaidamà: (Aria: Scelsi la via brevissima / "I chose the shortest way / towards the farm"). However, Bartolomeo orders Kaidamà to go back to the farm, brandishing his whip as a threat.

Appearing to set off as instructed, Kaidamà hides in one of the huts as Cardenio is heard offstage. He enters and expresses his sadness when describing a woman who clearly was his love: (Aria: Raggio d'amor parea / Nel anno primo april degli anni / "Like a gleam of love she was / In the prime of her life / But she was as beautiful as she was evil / Mistress of deceit / She had roses on her face / And thorns hidden in her heart"). This sadness causes the onlookers some anguish, especially when they see Cardenio looking at the possibility of jumping from the clifftop and into the sea, but spotting Marcella, Cardenio moves away and into the rocks. The assembled company laments, Bartolomeo instructs his daughter to leave the basket of food, and then moves towards the rocks to find the madman.

As the storm grows in intensity, Marcella and Kaidamà leave the hut. They see a ship perilously making its way through the raging seas, and the assembled group watches as the ship breaks apart and sinks. Eleonora is thrown on the shore and Marcella and the farmers carry her to a rock. Terrified at the sight of Kaidamà, she recoils in horror: "Oh! extreme torment! I am still alive!": (Aria: Ah! lasciatemi, tiranni! / "Ah! leave me, cruel ones! / I feel too many sorrows altogether! / I want to die. / Pity is cruel / To a mournful heart"). As Marcella, Kaidamà, and the farmers interject words of comfort, Eleonora confesses that she deceived her husband, but that she still loves him—"I'm burning with a tardy love"—and that she is tormented by her guilt: "I deserve the cruelty of heavens" she exclaims. Marcella offers her a change of clothes, but when Bartolomeo returns, having failed to find Cardenio, he demands the identity of the woman.

Cardenio reaches the beach (Tutto è velen per me!....Per me sconvolto / È l'ordin di natura! ...Aprile istesso / "Everything is poison to me! To me the nature of Order is upset! April itself / Is productive only of thorns! The grass is bitter..") He asks himself why he was betrayed, expressing his continuing love for Eleonora. Kaidamà leaves his hut and is approached by the delusional Cardenio who offers love and a share of the food left for him. As they eat, Cardenio again recalls his love (Di quei occhi ilampi ardenti / Rispondeano agli occi miei / "The ardent flashes of her beautiful eyes / Answered my eyes"). Suddenly his anger is aroused. he violently grabs Kaidamà's hand and demands to know where Eleonora is. The servant is in pain and, in a duet finale, the two men sing of their frustrations: Cardenio (Era il sorriso giorni miei / "She was the joy of my life") while Kaidamà demands to be left alone and proclaims that he will run away. Barolomeo emerges from his hut, Cardenio leaves, and Kaidamà runs into the hut.

Off shore, a ship is seen. It comes to shore and Fernando and sailors disembark, the latter proclaiming their joy at a safe arrival and Ferrando telling that his mother had urged him to try to find his brother (Ah! dammi, o ciel pietoso /, Ch'io qua non giunga invano / "Ah, pitiful heaven / not to have not come here in vain"). As Fernando makes his way through the rocks, wondering who may be able to him locate Cardenio, Kaidamà emerges, and each is surprised by the other's strange appearance. However, Kaidamà is quickly convinced to provide help by Fernando's offer of money.

Interior of Bartolomeo's hut

Marcella, leading Eleonora, and the countrypeople enter. Eleonora confesses her lack of innocence, but she is told that her father is bringing the madman to them. Both arrive, Cardenio demanding to know where he is being taken and Bartolomeo proclaiming that he wants to hear the madman's story and share his sorrow. Wife his wife remaining out of sight, Cardenio describes his love for "a Portuguese virgin" and what happened (Le fibre m'arsero / Parea da me diviso / "I fell in love / I seemed to be beside myself". Both parents had approved, but the ship carrying her dowry sank, leaving her father ruined and her prospective father-in-law refusing to allow his son to marry her. They married anyway, but the young bridegroom had to go off to sea leaving his new bride with a relative who betrayed her, seduced her, and left him bereft. On his return, she insulted him and he sought solace by hiding on the island).

Standing out of sight in the crowd, Eleonora tries to break free to run to Cardenio, but she is held back by Marcella. Bartolomeo is sympathetic to Cardenio's plight, but his tears are rejected until Fernando makes himself known to his brother. The brothers embrace until, finally unable to control herself, Eleonora breaks free and collapses at her husband's feet. Although he is moved by her appearance, he quickly rejects her and all the help that he has received.

Each character expresses his/her feelings in a quartet finale: Eleonora's Nel mio squardo mezzo-spento / Mira espresso il pentimento / "Look how my lifeless eyes / Express my regret" is followed by Cardenio's Donna iniqua! E non remmenti / "Wicked woman! Don't you remember / Your deceptions, your oaths?", then Ferando's In quell volto, in quell'accento / "On that face, in those words / Can't you see her regret?" and finally by Kaidamà, Marcella and the country people with Ah! fuggir, scappar lo fate / "Ah! Let him run away". To this, the assembled groups respond "Ah! you make us tremble and freeze" as they watch Cardenio – followed by Fernando – flee from the scene. Eleonora collapses.

=== Act 2 ===
On the seashore

The farmers and Kaidamà, searching for Cardenio, move along seashore and disappear. Cardenio then appears (Lasciatemi! Lasciatemi!... Tiranni! / "Leave me! Leave me!..Cruel ones!"). Eleonora hears him from inside the hut: "I want to see him again" she exclaims. Recognising her voice, he begins to run away, then falls. Eleonora and Marcella rush from the hut, Eleonora exclaiming: La mia vittima e qui. Cardenio! Oh in quale / Stato feral di morte / "My victim is here! Cardenio! Oh! In what / Funereal state"). Although he gets to his feet, he appears to be unable to see anything and is unaware of Eleonora’s presence. When in desperation he asks who will help him, Eleonora steps forward, telling him that only death can divide them from now on. Cardenio laments his state (La sventura / Fin la luce m’involo! / "Misfortune / Stole even the light from me") but, as he begins to be able to see again, he addresses her fondly. Suddenly the reality of who she is strikes him, and he grabs a cudgel and is about to strike her when Ferrando rushes in to prevents him. The madman quickly rushes off, leaping into the sea in order to drown himself. Tearing off his clothes, his brother plunges in after him.

Bartolomeo and the islanders come from along the shore, still searching for Cardenio. (Bartolomeo: Dove? Dove sara? Tutto la selva / Ho invan percorsa / "Where? Where is he? In vain / I scoured the whole wood"). Kaidamà rushes in and explains how Cardenio had plunged into the sea but had been rescued by Ferrando. Then another group of islanders appears, explaining that the madman seems now to be sane. This is immediately confirmed by Ferrando who recounts his brother’s wish to return to his country (Aria: No, quel di pria piu non e / "No, he is no longer his former self", and he expresses the hope that "his heart will make him shed a / A pitiful tear from his eye. / If pity wins, love triumphs..”)

As evening approaches, Cardenio, now dressed in new clothes and clean shaven, is melancholy (Aria: Qui pianse al pianto mio Qui la rividi / Piu bella del dolor…Pieta mi vines... / "Here she cried at my tears. Here I saw her again / More beautiful in her sorrow...Pity overcame me"). Unaware that Cardenio is watching, Kaidamà enters carrying two pistols. He is suddenly confronted by Cardenio who explains that his madness is over and demands that the pistols be handed over, telling the native that he has decided that dying together with Eleonora is the only way that he can continue (Aria: He deciso, e seco spento / Dileguar vedro gli affanni / "Yes, I decided: dying together with her, / I shall see my troubles disappear").

Darkness is descending as Ferrando brings Eleonora to Cardenio and, when she tearfully confesses, he gives her one of the pistols and orders her to shoot him, just as he will shoot her with the other one. It is only when the islanders enter bearing torches that Cardenio is able to see that Eleonora's pistol is pointed not at him but at herself. He realises that she does love him, and the couple is reunited: (Finale, Eleonora and Islanders. Eleonora's cavatina: Se pietoso di un oblio / Copri, o caro, I falli mieri / "My dear, if you forgive / My faults mercifully / I am fully happy / You are fully happy". Cabaletta: Che dalla gioia / "For the extreme happiness / I fear that my heart, / Oppressed by such joy, / Bursts in my breast").

== Recordings ==
Year	Cast: Marcella, Bartolomeo, Kaidamà, Cardenio, Eleonora, Fernando	Conductor, Opera House and Orchestra	Label
1958	Giuliana Tavolaccini, Silvio Maionica, Alfredo Mariotti, Ugo Savarese, Gabriella Tucci, Nicola Filacuridi	Franco Capuana, Accademia Musicale Chigiana and Chorus of Teatro dei Rinnovati di Siena, (Recording of a performance in Siena 14 September)	Black Disc: Cetra "Opera Live", Cat: LO 80/2; Melodram, Cat: MEL 156
1967	Lilia Teresita Reyes, Renato Borgato, Charles Williams, Gianluigi Colmagro, Rita Talarcio, Veriano Luchetti	Bruno Campanella, Orchestra of Teatro Verdi di Trieste and Oratorio SS.Stimmate di Roma Chorus, (Recording of a performance at the Spoleto Festival, July)	Black Disc: Musical Heritage Society, Cat: MHS 1543/1544; Mercury, Cat: SR 2-9133
1987	Elisabetta Tandura, Maurizio Picconi, Roberto Coviello, Stefano Antonucci, Luciana Serra, Luca Canonici	Carlo Rizzi, Orchestra Sinfonica di Piacenza and "Francesco Cilea" Chorus of Reggio Calabria, (Audio and video recordings of a performance or performances in the Teatro Chiabrera, Savona, 10 November)	Audio CD: Bongiovanni, Cat: GB 2056/58-2; Premiere Opera Ltd. Cat: CDNO 12103, DVD: House of Opera, Cat: DVDCC 591
