= Teatro Carcano =

Theatre in Milan, Italy

Coordinates: 45°27′22″N 9°11′42″E

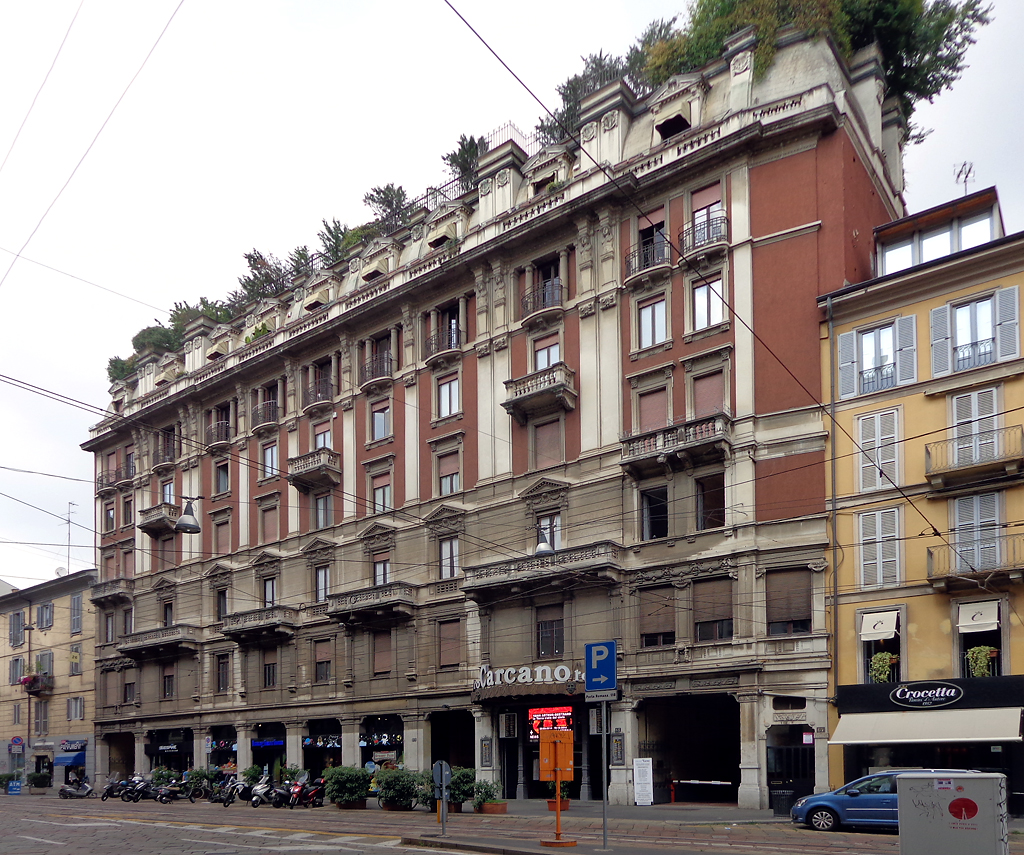
Entrance to the Teatro Carcano, 2014

The Teatro Carcano is a theatre in Milan, Italy, located at 63 Corso di Porta Romana. Although now exclusively devoted to plays and dance, it served as an opera house for much of the 19th century and saw the premieres of several important operas. Completed in 1803, the theatre was commissioned by the Milanese aristocrat and theatre-lover Giuseppe Carcano and originally designed by Luigi Canonica. Over the succeeding two centuries it has undergone several restructurings and renovations and for a time in the mid-20th century functioned as a cinema.

== History ==
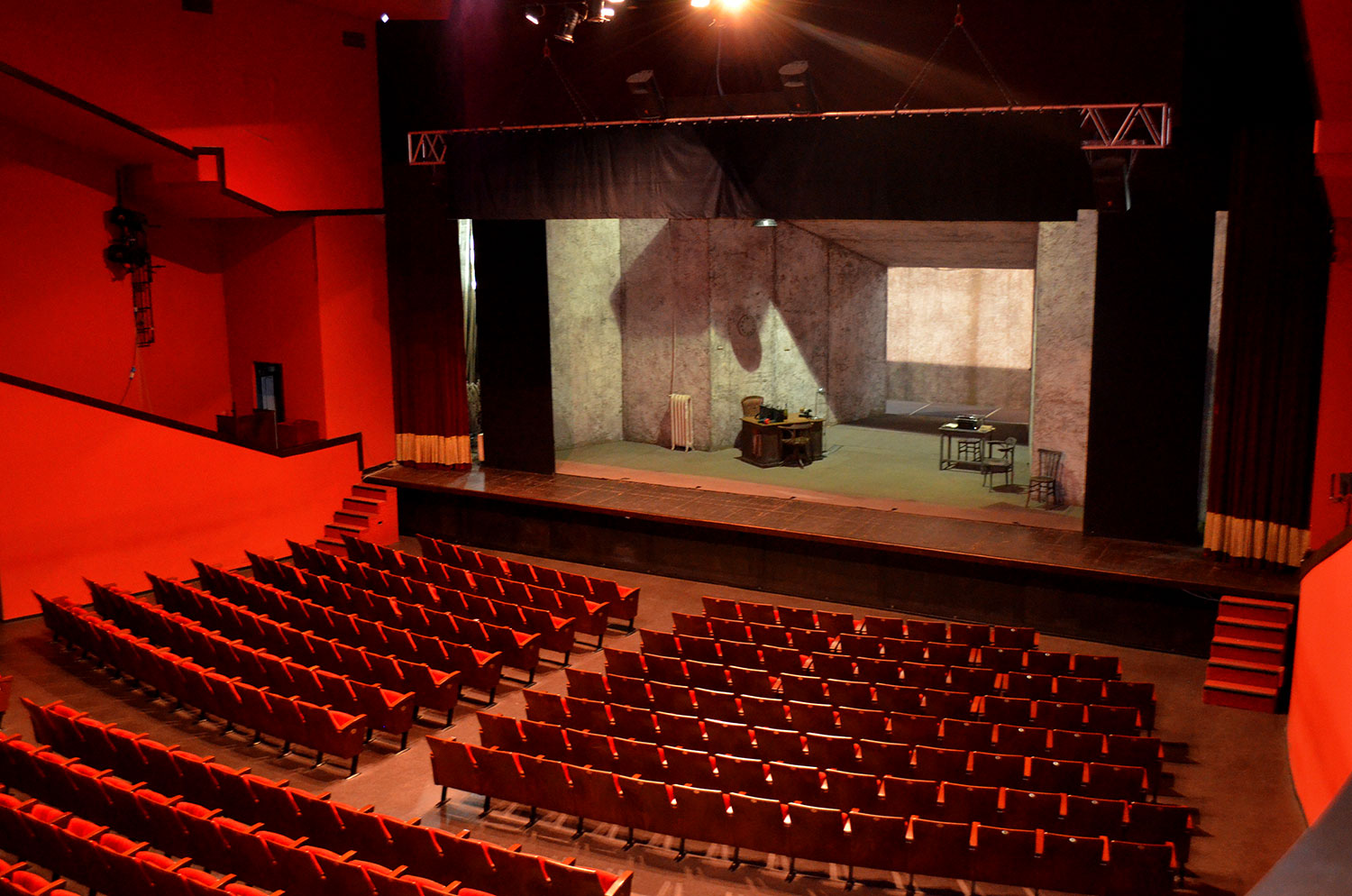
Interior

The Teatro Carcano was commissioned by the Milanese aristocrat and theatre-lover Giuseppe Carcano who entrusted the project to the young architect Luigi Canonica. Planning began in 1801 and construction began the following year. On 3 September 1803 the theatre was inaugurated with the world premieres of two works by the composer Vincenzo Federici—the opera Zaira with a libretto by Mattia Butturini and the ballet Alfredo il Grande with choreography by Paolo Franchi.

The Carcano was built on the site of the former convent of San Lazzaro in the Porta Romana district of Milan. It was modelled on the two most important public theatres in the city, La Scala (built in 1778) and the Teatro alla Cannobiana (built in 1779). Like those theatres it was designed in the neo-classical style with a horseshoe-shaped auditorium and four tiers of boxes. In total, it could accommodate 1500 spectators. The interior was lavishly decorated in stucco and gold leaf with frescoes and a large ceiling medallion over the auditorium. Contemporary descriptions of the opening performances praised not only the decor but also the extensive illumination provided for the stage. The theatre had its own restaurant and pâtisserie, and in 1806 a gambling casino was added.

The theatre was modernized and partially restructured in 1872 by the Milanese architect Achille Sfondrini. Opera and classical music concerts continued to be performed throughout the 19th century, although the premieres were increasingly by lesser known composers and the programming was expanded to include prose drama, band concerts, and circuses. By 1904 the theatre, which was essentially constructed of wood, was pronounced a serious fire hazard and closed. It was almost completely demolished and then rebuilt in stone to a design by Nazzareno Moretti. The resurrected theatre reopened in 1914.

== Notable performances and premieres ==
The Teatro Carcano saw the Milan premiere of Verdi's La battaglia di Legnano (1859); the first concert of Wagner's music to be given in the city (conducted by Franco Faccio, 1883); and the Italian premiere of Massenet's Manon (1893). The actress Eleonora Duse appeared before Milanese audiences for the first time in May 1884 in a season of plays performed at the Carcano by Cesare Rossi's theatre company. Duse performed in the leading roles in Fédora which opened the season and The Lady of the Camellias which ended it.

Operas which had their world premieres at the theatre include:

- Zaira by Vincenzo Federici, 3 September 1803
- Anna Bolena by Gaetano Donizetti, 26 December 1830
- La sonnambula by Vincenzo Bellini, 6 March 1831
- Flora mirabilis by Spyros Samaras, 16 May 1886
