= Massimiliano Quilici =

Italian composer

Massimiliano Quilici (3 April 1799 - 18 October 1889) was an Italian composer.

Born in Lucca, Quilici began his studies under his uncle Domenico Quilici; later he attended the Liceo Musicale di Lucca, of which he would later become director. His opera Francesca da Rimini premiered at the Teatro del Giglio in Lucca in 1829, and his opera Batrolomeo della Cavalla was first seen at the Teatro San Benedetto in Venice in 1838; the former is to a libretto by Felice Romani, while the latter is set to a text by Jacopo Ferretti. Francesca da Rimini is recorded as having been a fiasco at its premiere. A third opera, La penna del Diavolo of 1861, is also recorded as having been performed in Florence. He also wrote much sacred music, including a Requiem. He died in the city of his birth, and is interred in the Cimiterio di Lucca. Quilici was the music teacher of Maria Luisa, Duchess of Lucca; his other pupils included Ferdinando Taglioni.
