= Gabrielle Ferrari =

French pianist and composer

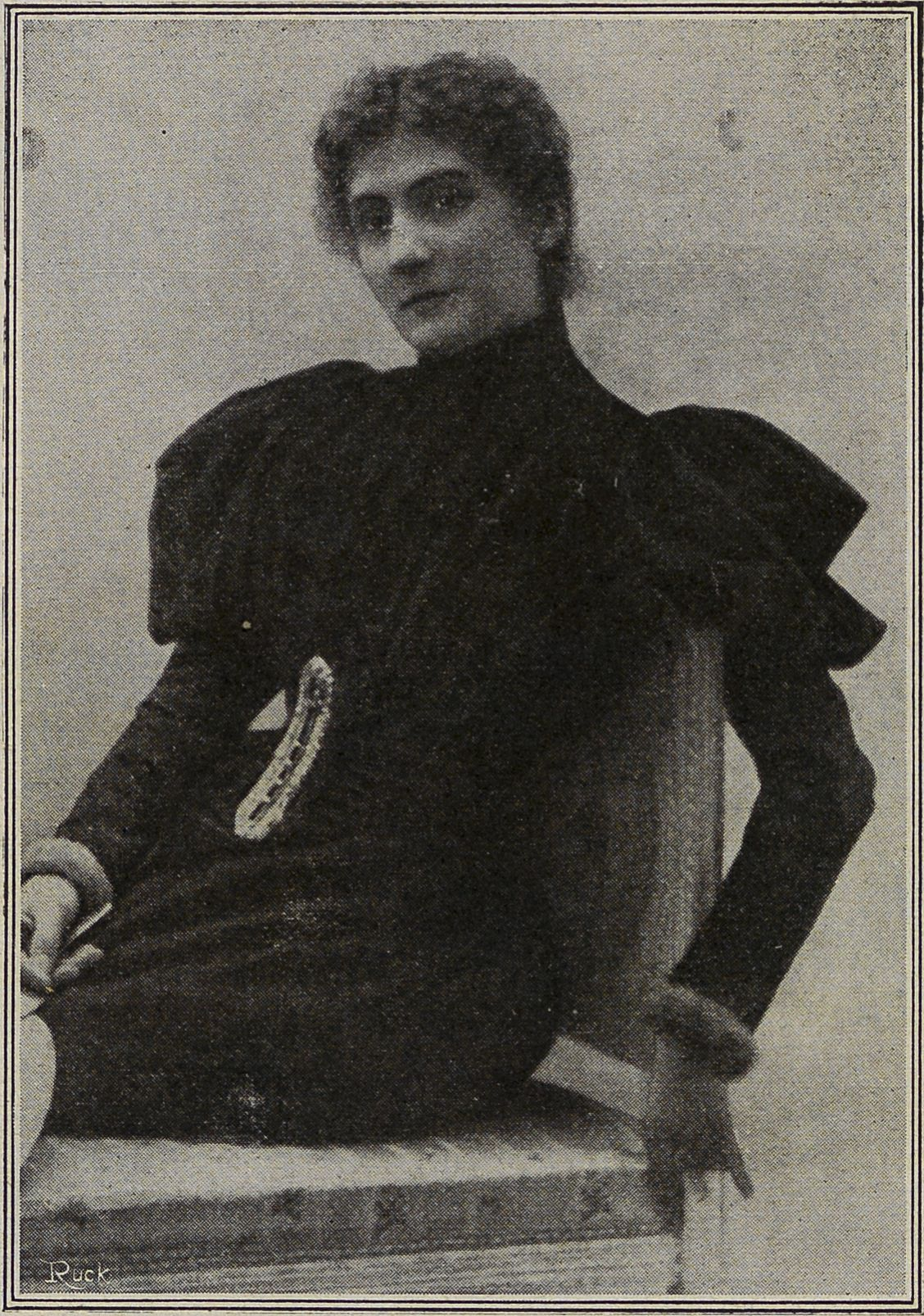
Gabrielle Ferrari

Gabrielle Ferrari (14 September 1851 – 4 July 1921) was a French pianist and composer noted for opera. Born Gabrielle Colombari, she was born and died in Paris and studied with Charles Gounod and Théodore Dubois. Her opera Le Cobzar premiered in Monte Carlo.

She married François Ferrari with whom she had four daughters.

== Works ==
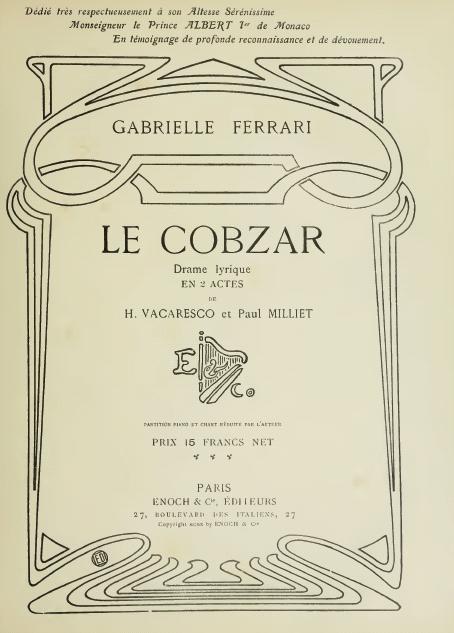
Title page of Le Cobzar

Ferrari composed operas and songs, writing her own text, and also for orchestral and piano performance. Selected works include:

- Le dernier amour, (1895) opera
- Le Tartare, (1906) opera
  - Libretto by Elena Văcărescu (Hélène Vacaresco)
  - Libretto by Paul Berlier
- Le Cobzar, (1909) opera
  - Libretto by Elena Văcărescu (Hélène Vacaresco) and Paul Milliet
- Feuilles d'album, Op. 76
- Feuille morte
- Menuet
- Nirvana
- Fantasie Symphonique
- Jeanne d'Arc
