= Spyridon Samaras =

Greek composer (1861–1917)

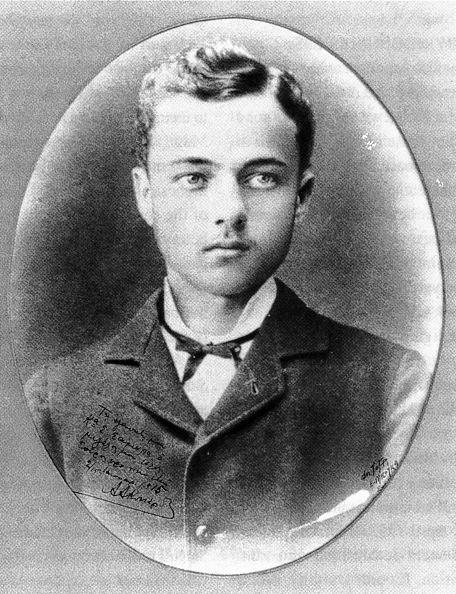
- Spyridon Samaras
- Born: 29 November 1861; Corfu, Greece
- Died: 7 April 1917 (aged 55); Athens, Greece
- Education: Conservatoire de Paris, Athens Conservatoire
- Occupation: Composer
- Writing career
- Notable work: Olympic Hymn
- Movement: Ionian School

Spyridon-Filiskos Samaras (Greek: Σπυρίδων Σαμάρας; 29 November 1861 – 7 April 1917) was a Greek composer particularly admired for his operas. His compositions were praised worldwide during his lifetime and he is arguably the most important composer of the Ionian School. Among his best-known works are the operas Flora mirabilis (1886) and Mademoiselle de Belle-Isle (1905). He also composed the music for the Olympic Hymn.

== Biography ==
Samaras was born in Corfu. His mother was from Constantinople and his father, Skarlatos Samaras, was born in Vienna to a Greek family originally from Siatista. As a young man, he studied with Spyridon Xyndas (Σπυρίδων Ξύνδας). From 1875 to 1882 he studied at the Athens Conservatory with Federico Bolognini, Angelo Mascheroni and Enrico Stancampiano. His first opera Torpillae (now lost) was premiered in Athens in 1879. He went to Paris in 1882 to study at the Paris Conservatoire and became a favorite of Jules Massenet. His other instructors included Léo Delibes, Théodore Dubois, and Charles Gounod. He worked successfully as a composer in Paris for three years and then migrated to Italy in 1885.

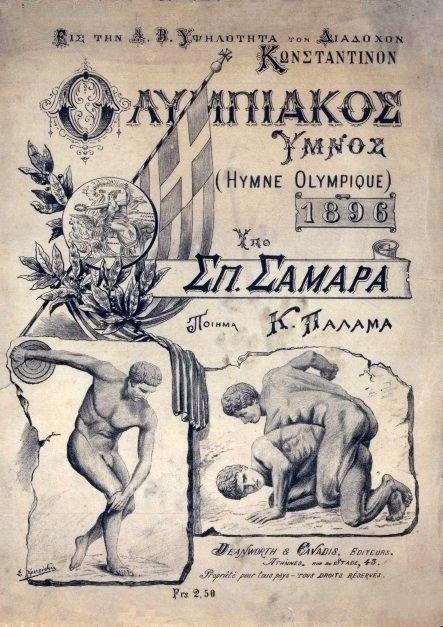
Initial page of the Olympic Hymn for the 1896 Summer Olympics.

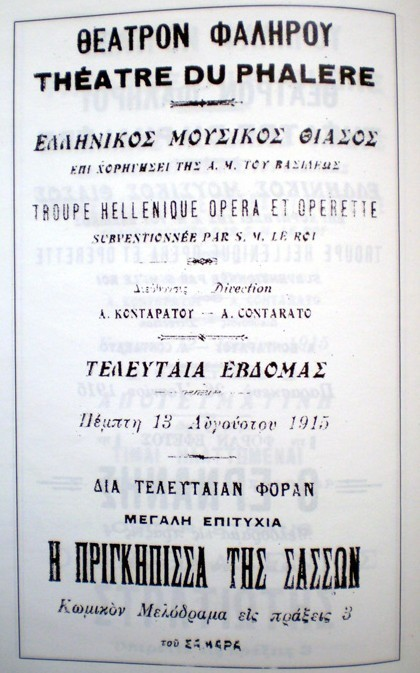
"The Princess of Sasson" operetta (1915).

Samaras quickly became an important figure in the opera scene in Italy. His opera Flora mirabilis premiered in Milan in 1886 and in 1888 Medgé was successfully staged at the Teatro Costanzi in Rome with French opera star Emma Calvé in the title role.

He became closely associated with Edoardo Sonzogno, a Milanese publisher. Sonzogno founded the Teatro Lirico Internazionale and chose Samaras' La martire for the theater's opening on 22 September 1894. The opera had premiered previously that year in Naples and is based on a libretto by Luigi Illica with many naturalistic elements, which gave space to Samaras' musical personality for an equal treatment.

Samaras' works enjoyed wide distribution; his operas were staged in Paris, Monte Carlo, Cologne, Berlin, Vienna, Malta, Bucharest, Constantinople, Smyrna, Alexandria, Cairo, Greece and Italy. He wrote fifteen stage works, the last three on texts by Paul Milliet; Storia d'amore o La biondinetta (1903), Mademoiselle de Belle-Isle (1905) and Rhea (1908). The overture for Rhea used the opening fanfare of the Olympic Hymn.

He returned to Greece in 1911, believing that he would be appointed director of the Athens Conservatoire. However he was not, partly because of the "National School controversy". The composers of the so-called "National School" considered the composers of the Ionian School, like Samaras, too much Italian influenced.

He supported himself by composing operettas aiming at satisfying a variety of audiences, rather than continuing in his usual creative vein. His last opera, Tigra, although started about this time and containing some of his best music, was never finished.

Samaras was chosen by Demetrius Vikelas for composing the Olympic Anthem. The lyrics were written by Kostis Palamas. The anthem was first performed during the opening ceremony of the 1896 Summer Olympics, the first modern Olympic Games. However it was largely forgotten by the Olympic movement for the next 50 years. In the 1950s there was a contest to find an alternative. However many considered the work chosen to be unsatisfactory. In 1958, at the International Olympic Committee Session in Tokyo it was performed once more. Ryōtarō Azuma, IOC member in Japan and Governor of Tokyo had been sent the score by Jean Ketseas in Greece. At the urging of Prince Axel of Denmark, it was declared the official anthem of the Olympic movement by the International Olympic Committee in 1958 and has been used at every opening ceremony since the 1960 Winter Olympics. Samaras died, aged 55, in Athens and is interred in the National Cemetery close to the stadium where the 1896 Games took place.

A bust of Samaras was toppled in Corfu in August 2020.

== Compositions ==
=== Complete stage works ===
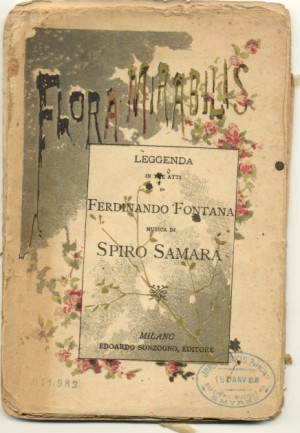
Original libretto's cover for Flora mirabilis (1887).

=== Opera ===
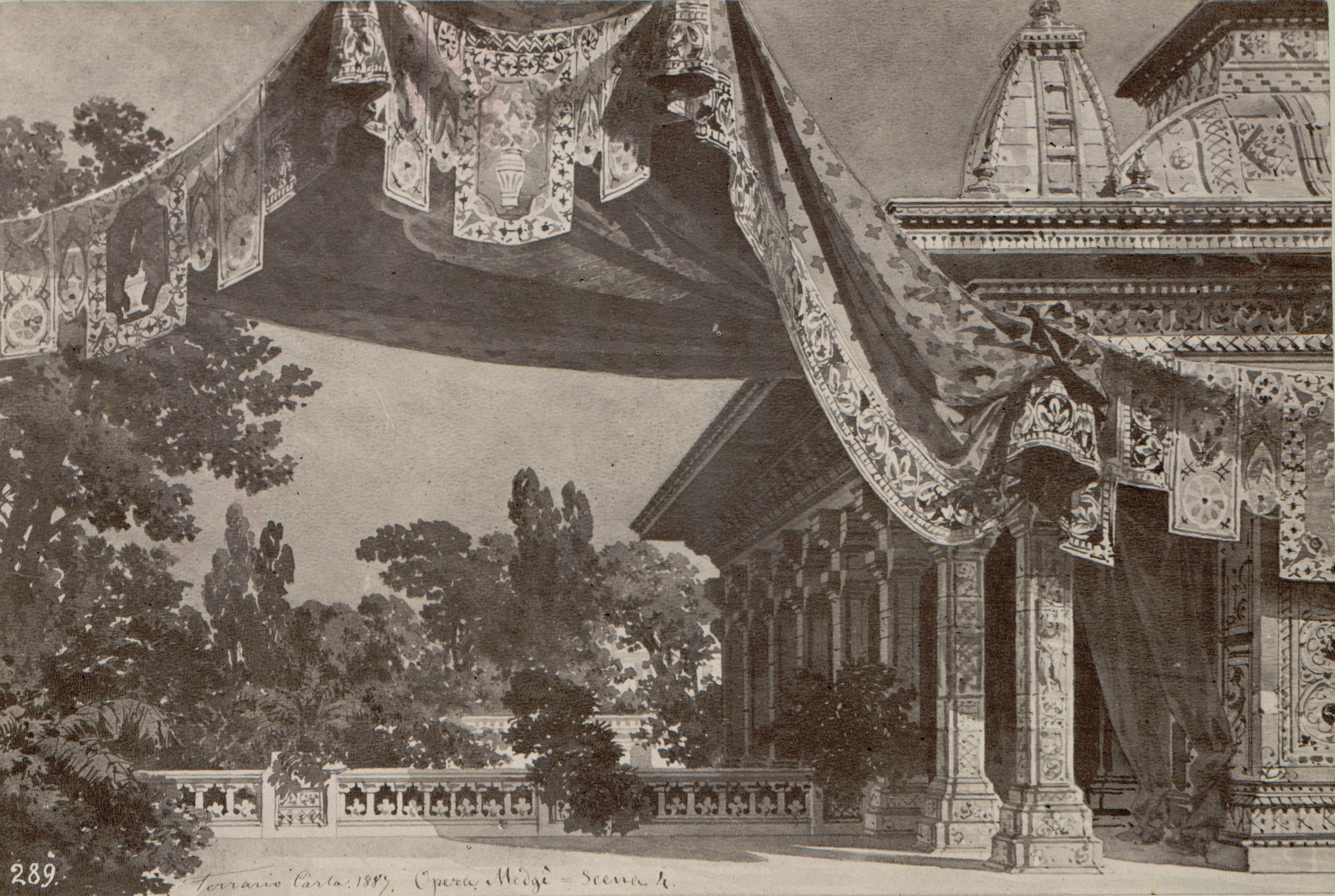
Terrazzo negli appartamenti di Medgè, set design for Medgè act 3 scene 1 (1887).

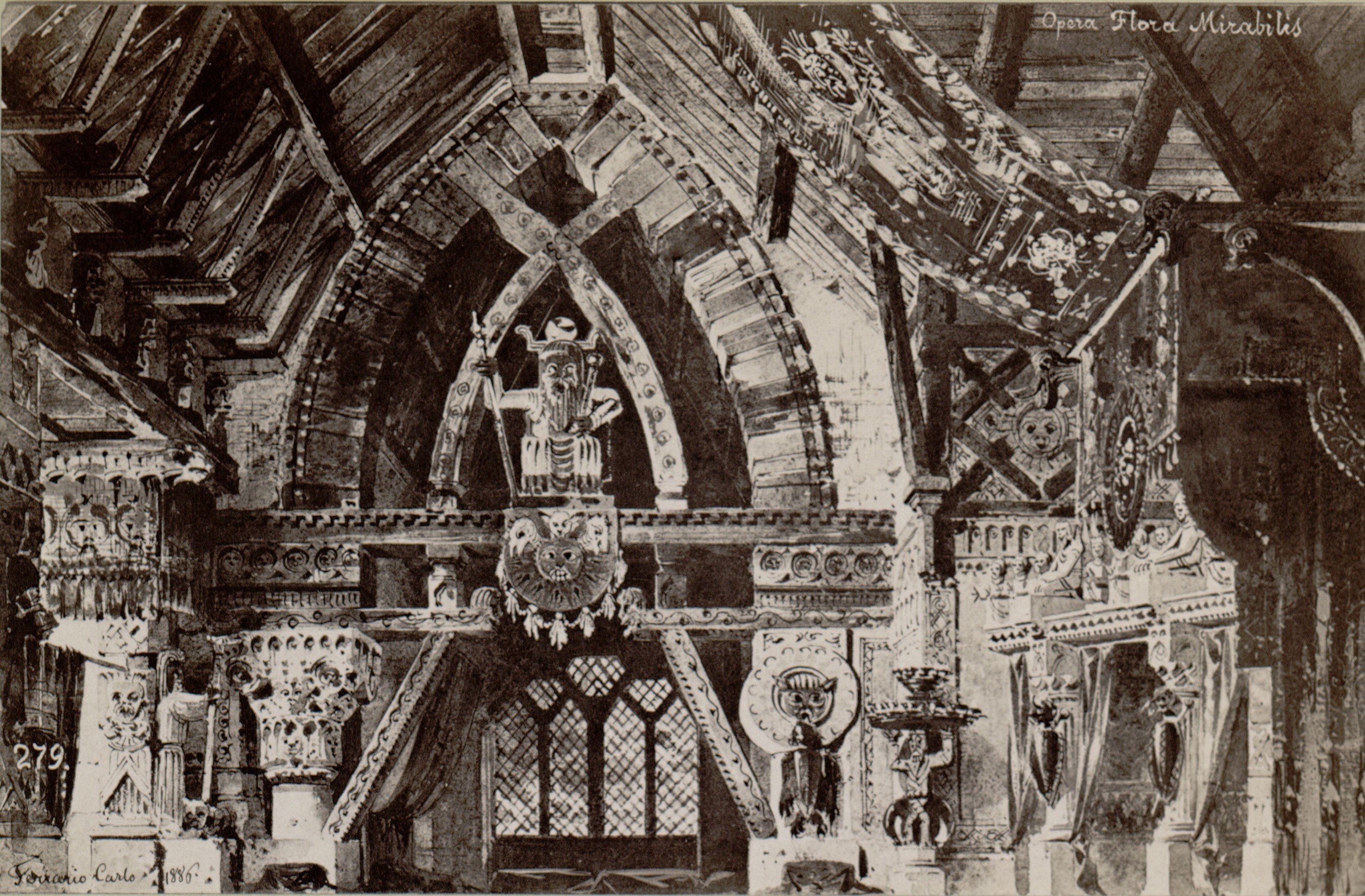
Ricca sala nel castello d'Orèbro, set design for Flora Mirabilis act 1 scene 1 (1886).

- Torpillae, incidental music for a play, words by Gavziilidis and K. Triandafyllos, Athens, 1879.
- Olas, opera in 4 Acts, libretto by Fravassili, now lost, 1882.
- Flora mirabilis, opera in 3 Acts, libretto by Ferdinando Fontana, Teatro alla Scala, Milan, 1886.
- Medge, opera in 4 Acts, libretto by Ferdinando Fontana, Teatro Constanzi, Rome, 1888.
- Messidor, opera after Alexandre Dumas' novel Le Chevalier de Maison-Rouge, written before 1891, now lost.
- Lionella, opera in 3 Acts, libretto by Fontana, lost except for Hungarian Rhapsody, orch, Teatro alla Scala, Milan, 4 April 1891.
- La martire, opera in 3 Acts, libretto by Luigi Illica, Teatro Lirico Internazionale, Milan, 1894.
- La furia domata, opera in 3 Acts, libretto by E. A. Butti and G. Macchi after Shakespeare's The Taming of the Shrew, Teatro Lirico Internazionale, Milan, 1895.
- Storia d’amore o La biondinetta, opera in 3 Acts, libretto by Paul Milliet, Teatro Lirico Internazionale, Milan, 1903.
- Mademoiselle de Belle-Isle, opera in 4 Acts, French libretto by Paul Milliet after the play by Dumas, in Italian at Teatro Politeama, Genoa, 1905.
- Rhea, opera in 3 Acts, libretto by Paul Milliet, Teatro Verdi, Florence, 1908.
- Tigra, opera in 3 Acts unfinished, libretto R. Simoni, 1911, only Act 1 exists.

=== Operetta ===
- Pólemos en polémo, operetta in 3 Acts, libretto by G. Tsokopoulos and I. Delikaterinis, Athens, 10 April 1914.
- I pringípissa tis Sassónos, operetta in 3 Acts, libretto by N.I. Laskaris and P. Dimitrakopoulos, Athens, 21 Jan 1915.
- I Kritikopoúla, operetta in 3 Acts, libretto by Laskaris and Dimitrakopoulos, Athens, 30 March 1916.

=== Selected piano music ===
- Scènes Orientales, Quatre Suites caractéristiques, Paris, 1882
- Bohémienne, 1888
