= Giovanni Giraud =

Count Giovanni Giraud (1776–1834), Italian dramatist, of French origin, was born at Rome, and showed a precocious passion for the theatre. His first play, L'Honestà non si vince, was successfully produced in 1798. He took part in politics as an active supporter of Pope Pius VI, but was mainly occupied with the production of his plays. In 1809 he became director-general of the Italian theatres.

According to the Encyclopædia Britannica Eleventh Edition, Giraud's comedies, the best of which are Gelosie per equivoco (1807) and L'Ajo nell'imbarazzo (1824), were bright and amusing on the stage, but of no particular literary quality. His collected comedies were published in 1823 and his Teatro domestico in 1825. He died at Naples in 1834.
