= Jacopo Ferretti =

Italian writer, poet and opera librettist

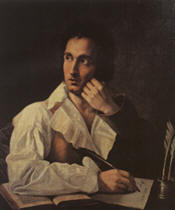
Jacopo Ferretti, Italian librettist and poet, 1784—1852

Jacopo Ferretti (16 July 1784 – 7 March 1852) was an Italian writer, poet and opera librettist. His name is sometimes written as Giacomo Ferretti.

He is most famous for having supplied the libretti for two operas composed by Rossini and for five operas composed by Donizetti.

== Life ==
Introduced by his father to literature while very young, in addition to his native Italian, Ferretti mastered not only Latin and Ancient Greek but also French and English, and began writing verse early. Even though he worked in the tobacco industry from the age of about 30 until he was over 60, he was extremely prolific, writing "everything from love letter to odes and welcoming speeches", and numerous opera libretti, all but the few listed below being generally forgotten.

His first big success was La Cenerentola, written at great speed for Rossini over Christmas in 1816. Ferretti wrote afterwards how he had agreed to write a libretto on a subject which the censor vetoed, so he met the composer and the theatre manager to discuss alternatives. He struggled to find a new subject that appealed, but about two dozen were rejected for one reason or another. At last, yawning wearily, Ferretti said "La Cenerentola" ("Cinderella") and at last Rossini decided he liked it, so Ferretti went home and began at once, worked night and day on it, and gave sections to Rossini on Christmas Day. Early on during the production there were problems, but Rossini predicted (correctly) that it would be a great success in the long term.

Ferretti married the singer Teresa Terziani in 1820, and their house was continually visited by musicians and poets, including Donizetti who had been given a letter of introduction to Ferretti by Johann Simon Mayr. They became good friends after the young composer's arrival in Rome in October 1821 for the preparation of the production of his Zoraida di Granata, which became his first major success. Ferretti worked on revising Bartolomeo Merelli's libretto for the opera.

== Librettos by Ferretti ==
Altogether, Ferretti wrote about 70 librettos, the majority of which were for operas presented in Rome.

Title	Genre	Subdivisions	Music	Première	Place, theatre	Notes
L'inganno dura poco, ossia Le nozze di don Madrigale	burletta	2 acts	Cesare Jannoni	9 September 1807	Rome, Teatro Valle	
La principessa per ripiego	dramma giocoso	2 acts	Francesco Morlacchi	15 April 1809	Rome, Teatro Valle	Probably after La villanella ingentilita by Francesco Saverio Zini
La Didone	dramma serio	3 acts	Valentino Fioravanti	9 June 1810	Rome, Teatro Valle	After Didone abbandonata by Pietro Metastasio
Baldovino	dramma serio		Niccolò Antonio Zingarelli	1811	Rome, Teatro Argentina	
Il bello piace a tutti	melodramma giocoso	1 act	Valentino Fioravanti	1811		
Berenice regina d'Armenia	dramma per musica	3 acts	Niccolò Antonio Zingarelli	12 November 1811	Rome, Teatro Valle	After Lucio Vero by Apostolo Zeno. As Berenice in Armenia: music by Carlo Evasio Soliva, March 1817, Turin, Teatro Regio
Tito in Langres	dramma serio	2 acts	Antonio del Fante	4 January 1813	Rome, Teatro Argentina	
Amore assottiglia l'ingegno	dramma buffo	2 acts	Pietro Carlo Guglielmi	26 December 1814	Rome, Teatro Valle	
Rinaldo d'Asti	dramma buffo	2 acts	Carlo Coccia	17 February 1816	Rome, Teatro Valle	
La Cenerentola, ossia La bontà in trionfo	dramma giocoso	2 acts	Gioachino Rossini	25 January 1817	Rome, Teatro Valle	
Polissena	dramma giocoso	3 acts	Ferdinando Rutini	11 February 1817	Rome, Teatro Argentina	
Bartolommeo colla Cavalla	melodramma buffo	2 acts	Antonio Pauselli	Autumn 1817	Florence, Teatro della Pergola	1827: Carlo Conti (as L'innocente in periglio); 1836: Paolo Lami; 1838: Massimiliano Quilici
Pulcinella impresario			Ferdinando Rutini	1817	Rome	
Scipione in Cartagine	melodramma serio	2 acts	Saverio Mercadante	26 December 1820	Rome, Teatro Argentina	
La festa della riconoscenza o sia Il pellegrino bianco	melodramma giocoso	2 acts	Filippo Grazioli	25 January 1821	Rome, Teatro Apollo	
Matilde di Shabran, o sia Bellezza, e cuor di ferro	melodramma giocoso	2 acts	Gioachino Rossini	24 February 1821	Rome, Teatro Apollo	
La capricciosa ed il soldato	melodramma giocoso	2 acts	Michele Carafa	26 December 1821	Rome, Teatro Apollo	
Cesare in Egitto	melodramma eroico	2 acts	Giovanni Pacini	26 December 1821	Rome, Teatro Argentina	
Zoraida di Granata	melodramma eroico	2 acts	Gaetano Donizetti	28 January 1822	Rome, Teatro Argentina	Contributed. After Bartolomeo Merelli
Amalia e Palmer	melodramma	2 acts	Filippo Celli	14 September 1822	Teatro Argentina	
Eufemio di Messina	melodramma eroico	2 acts	Michele Carafa	26 December 1822	Rome, Teatro Argentina	
Il corsaro, ovvero Un maestro di cappella al Marocco	melodramma giocoso	2 acts	Filippo Celli	26 December 1822	Rome, Teatro Valle	
Amori ed armi		2 acts	Francesco Cianciarelli	Carnival 1823	Rome, Teatro Valle	
L'ajo nell'imbarazzo, o Don Gregorio	melodramma giocoso	2 acts	Gaetano Donizetti	4 February 1824	Rome, Teatro Valle	
Gli amici di Siracusa	melodramma eroico	3 acts	Saverio Mercadante	7 February 1824	Rome, Teatro Argentina	
L'audacia fortunata	dramma giocoso per musica		Antonio Sapienza	Summer 1824	Naples, Teatro del Fondo	1827: Carlo Conti
Riccardo l'intrepido	melodramma	2 acts	Giuseppe Balducci	9 September 1824	Rome, Teatro Valle	
La comunità di Castel Formicolone ovvero Le gelosie villane	dramma giocoso	2 acts	Vittorio Trento	1824		
Le civette in apparenza o sia una Lezione ai maldicenti	melodramma	1 act	Luigi Gambale	3 June 1826	Rome, Teatro Valle	
La fedeltà fra i boschi o sia Il taglialegna di Dombar			Filippo Grazioli	September 1826	Rome, Teatro Valle	
Olivo e Pasquale	melodramma giocoso	2 acts	Gaetano Donizetti	7 January 1827	Rome, Teatro Valle	
La sposa persiana			Luigi Gambale	1827		
La sciocca per astuzia			Luigi Gambale	7 February 1828	Rome	
L'orfanella di Ginevra	melodramma semiserio	2 acts	Luigi Ricci	9 September 1829	Rome, Teatro Valle	
L'eroina del Messico	melodramma serio	2 acts	Luigi Ricci	9 February 1830	Rome, Teatro di Tordinona	
Il corsaro	melodramma romantico	3 acts	Giovanni Pacini	15 January 1831	Rome, Teatro Apollo	
Il nuovo Figaro	melodramma giocoso	2 acts	Luigi Ricci	15 February 1832	Parma, Nuovo Teatro Ducale	
Il furioso all'isola di San Domingo	melodramma	2 acts	Gaetano Donizetti	2 January 1833	Rome, Teatro Valle	
Torquato Tasso	melodramma	3 acts	Gaetano Donizetti	9 September 1833	Rome, Teatro Valle	
Il Cid	melodramma serio	2 acts	Luigi Savj	22 January 1834	Parma, Nuovo Teatro Ducale	
I due incogniti	melodramma semiserio		Francesco Bornacini	5 February 1834	Rome, Teatro Valle	
Eran due or son tre	melodramma buffo	2 acts	Luigi Ricci	10 May 1834	Venice, Teatro San Benedetto	
La casa disabitata	melodramma giocoso	2 acts	Lauro Rossi	16 August 1834	Milan, Teatro alla Scala	
Chi dura vince	melodramma eroicomico	2 acts	Luigi Ricci	26 December 1834	Rome, Teatro Valle	
La pazza per amore	melodramma semiserio	2 acts	Pietro Antonio Coppola	14 February 1835	Rome, Teatro Valle	
Il colonnello	melodramma giocoso	2 acts	Luigi Ricci and Federico Ricci	14 March 1835	Naples, Teatro del Fondo	
Monsieur de Chalumeaux	melodramma comico	2 acts	Federico Ricci	14 June 1835	Venice, Teatro San Benedetto	
Giulietta ossia La fanciulla abbandonata	melodramma	2 acts	Pasquale Guglielmo	1835		
Il disertore per amore	melodramma giocoso	2 acts	Luigi Ricci and Federico Ricci	13 February 1836	Naples, Teatro del Fondo	
La festa della rosa	melodramma giocoso	2 acts	Pietro Antonio Coppola	29 June 1836	Vienna, Theater am Kärntnertor	
Salvini e Adelson	melodramma semiserio	2 acts	Luigi Savi	1839		
Il sogno punitore	melodramma	3 acts	Giuseppe Gerli	1839		
Furio Camillo	melodramma tragico	3 acts	Giovanni Pacini	26 December 1839	Rome, Teatro Apollo	
Contraddizione e puntiglio	melodramma giocoso		Michele Simeoni	1842		
Paolo e Virginia	melodramma semiserio	3 acts	Mario Aspa	29 April 1843	Rome, Teatro Metastasio	As Gli isolani: Davide Dugnani, 1857
Il folletto	melodramma giocoso	2 acts	Pietro Antonio Coppola	18 June 1843	Rome, Teatro Valle	
Il puntiglioso			Antonio Brancaccio	1846		
Gismonda di Mendrisio	tragedia lirica	3 acts	Luigi Badia	10 February 1846	Bologna, Teatro Comunale	
La figlia di Figaro	melodramma giocoso	3 acts	Lauro Rossi	17 April 1846	Vienna, Theater am Kärntnertor	
Il cavaliere di San Giorgio, ossia Il mulatto	melodramma semiserio	2 acts	Giuseppe Lillo	Autumn 1846	Turin, Teatro Carignano	
