= Antonio Sapienza =

Italian composer

Antonio Sapienza (18 June 1794 – 1855) was an Italian composer and conductor. He was born in St. Petersburg, Russian Empire where he began his musical studies with his father who was also called Antonio. (Antonio Sapienza Sr. (1755–1829) had emigrated from Naples to Russia in 1783 and served as a musician and voice teacher at the Russian imperial court.)

At the age of 28, Sapienza left Russia for Naples to continue his musical studies at the conservatory there with Giacomo Tritto, Niccolò Antonio Zingarelli and Pietro Generali, during which time he composed two Masses, several motets and a Salve regina. He remained in Italy for six years and composed three operas for the Neapolitan theatres which were well-received in their day. According to the Allgemeine musikalische Zeitung, he was also one of the several composers who produced the dramatic cantata, La fondazione di Partenope, performed at the Teatro San Carlo on 12 January 1824 to celebrate the birthday of King Ferdinand I of the Two Sicilies.

Sapienza returned to St. Petersburg in 1828 where he served as choirmaster and conductor at the Imperial Theatre until his death in 1855.

== Operas ==
- Rodrigo (opera seria); Librettist: Giovanni Federico Schmidt; Premiere: Teatro San Carlo. Naples, 28 August 1823 (also performed at La Scala, Milan under the title Gonzalvo during the 1825/26 Carnival season)
- L'audacia fortunata (opera buffa); Librettist: Jacopo Ferretti; Premiere: Teatro del Fondo, Naples, summer 1824
- Tamerlano (dramma per musica); Librettist: Andrea Leone Tottola; Premiere: Teatro San Carlo, Naples, 27 November 1824
- Ivan Tsarevich; Librettist: unknown; Premiere: St. Petersburg, 1830
