= Paolo Bordogna =

Italian opera singer

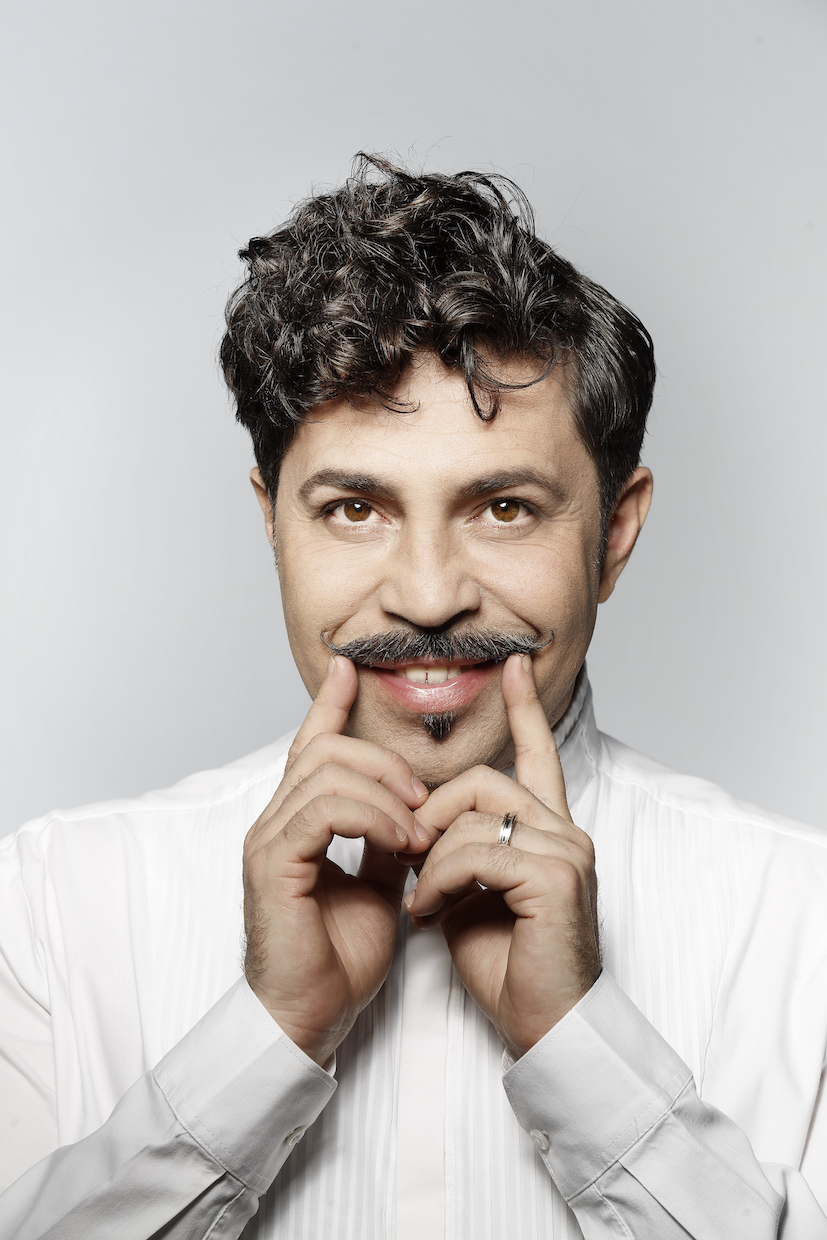
- Paolo Bordogna in 2018
- Born: January 2, 1972 (age 54); Melzo, Italy
- Occupation: Opera singer
- Years active: 2005 – present

Paolo Bordogna (born January 2, 1972) is an Italian operatic baritone and bass. He is particularly associated with buffo (comic) roles.

== Biography ==
Bordogna studied singing with baritone Roberto Coviello. Since 2005, he has appeared often at the Rossini Opera Festival, Pesaro in such roles as Don Magnifico in La Cenerentola, Bartolo in The Barber of Seville and numerous others. His career has taken him to the Teatro Real, La Scala, Bayerische Staatsoper, the Paris Opera, The Royal Opera, and many others of the world's leading opera houses. He has also performed the roles of Dandini in La cenerentola and Figaro in The Barber of Seville. Over 50 roles in his wide repertory include the title roles of Donizetti's Don Pasquale and Dr. Dulcamara in that composer's L'elisir d'amore.

In Mozart operas, he has performed as Figaro in Le nozze di Figaro at Opera Australia, Don Alfonso in Cosi fan Tutte at Teatro dell'Opera di Roma and Leporello in Don Giovanni for Staatsoper Wien.

In 2016, he joined a civil union with his partner Adalberto Ruggeri.

== Selected discography ==
- Don Gregorio. DVD: Dynamic. Cat: 33579
- La cambiale di matrimonio. DVD: Naxos Cat: 2110228
- La gazza ladra. DVD: Dynamic, Cat: 33567
- La Cenerentola. CD: Naxos Records Cat: 8.660191-92
- Un giorno di regno. DVD (Blu-ray, PAL): Unitel Classica Cat: 720304
- Tutti in maschera. DVD: Bongiovanni Cat:675754013264
- Tutto buffo, solo album Decca records Cat: 4811685
