= Alix Payen =

French Communard ambulance driver

- Louise Alix Milliet
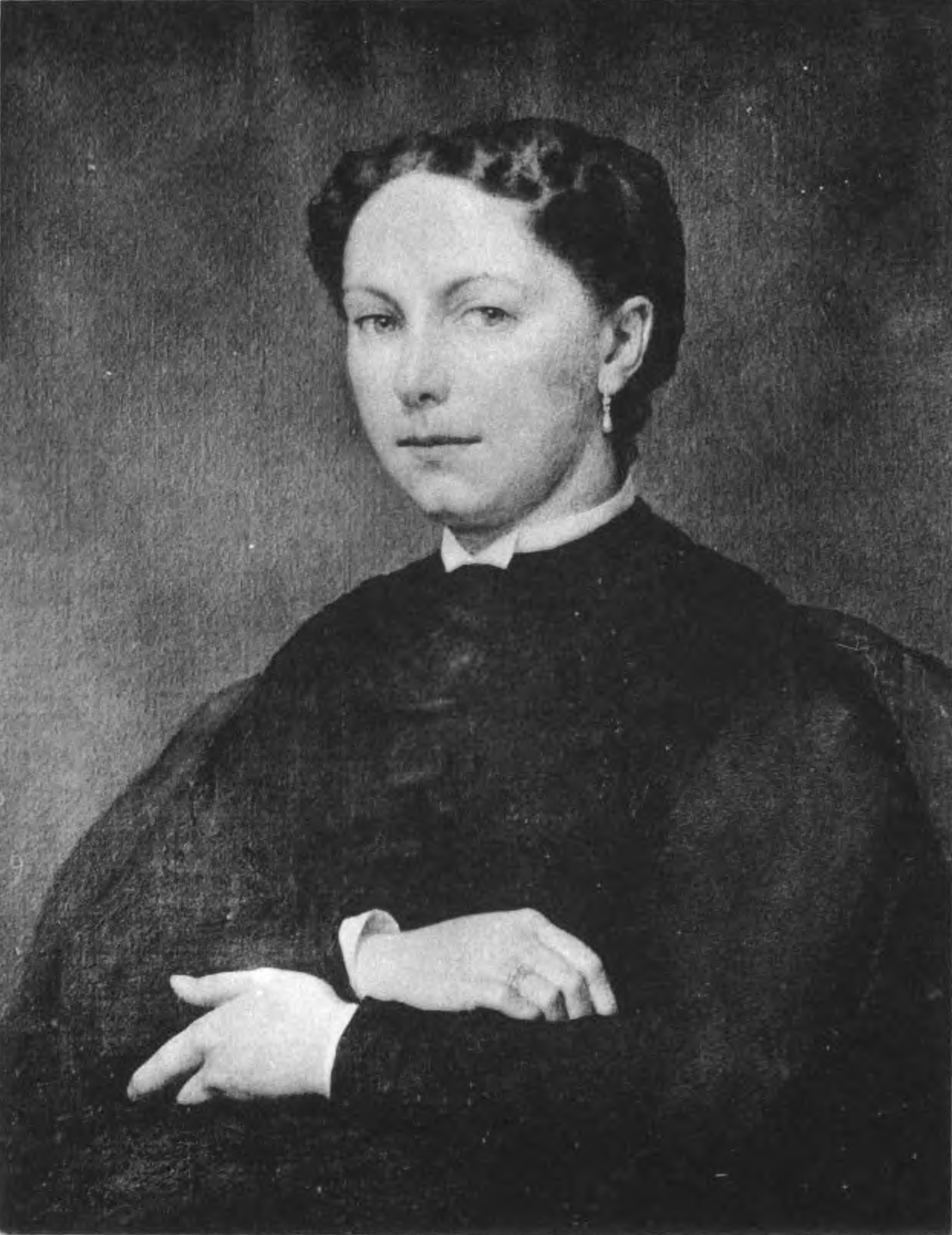
- Portrait of Alix Payen by her brother Paul Milliet.
- Born: 18 May 1842; Le Mans, France
- Died: December 24, 1903 (aged 61); 6th arrondissement of Paris, France
- Military career
- Allegiance: Commune of Paris (1871)
- Units: 153rd Battalion, XIth Legion; Ambulance driver

Alix Payen (born Milliet on May 18, 1842, in Le Mans and died on December 24, 1903, in Paris) was a French Communard ambulance driver. She is known for her letters to her family, which were published after her death.

Born into a bourgeois, republican and Fourierist family, Alix Payen grew up in Savoy, exiled from the regime of Napoleon III. She settled in the 10th arrondissement of Paris in 1861, after marrying Henri Payen, a sergeant in the National Guard, at the age of 19.

After the 1870 war against Germany was lost, the National Guard took part in the Paris Commune insurrection and was subjected to a siege by the regular army, known as the Versailles army. While her husband left to fight alongside the insurrectionists, Alix Payen followed him. She joined the 153rd Battalion of the XIth Legion as an ambulance driver. For a month, from April to May 1871, she was present at the fort of Issy, the fort of Vanves, in the trenches of Clamart, in Levallois and then in Neuilly. Her husband was wounded and suffering from tetanus, and she retired to Paris at the end of May to look after him. He died during the last days of the Commune. She managed to escape the Versailles repression.

During her enlistment, Alix Payen maintained regular correspondence with her family. With a bourgeois eye, she describes the difficult conditions, the lack of food and equipment. She recounts the confrontations as well as life within her battalion. In Paris, her mother and sister tell of their daily lives during the Commune. Her letters, a rare contemporary testimony, give an account of women's participation in the fighting and their place in it, ambiguous between overstepping a space reserved for men and accepting male domination, through the duties imposed on the wife who follows her husband.

After the Commune, with no money, Alix Payen returned to live with her parents in Paris. She tried to make a living on her own by doing odd jobs in the art world, before marrying for a second time in 1880, albeit briefly. She spent the last thirty years of her life with her family at the Colonie, a Fourierist phalanstery in the forest of Rambouillet. She died in 1903 at the age of 61.

After his death, his correspondence was published in 1910 by Paul Milliet, Alix Payen's brother, as part of a family biography in the Cahiers de la Quinzaine directed by Charles Péguy, and then in 2020 in a book dedicated to him by Michèle Audin.

== Life until 1870 ==
=== Family ===
Alix Payen was born Louise Alix Milliet in 1842 in Le Mans, in the department of Sarthe. She was the daughter of Louise de Tucé, from a wealthy aristocratic family in Le Mans, and of Félix Milliet, a less wealthy rentier from the Drôme, who, shortly after her birth, resigned from the army to live with his family.

She had two brothers, Fernand (1840-1885), a soldier sent to Algeria and Mexico, and Paul (1844-1918), a painter and family biographer, and two sisters. The first, named Jeanne (1848-1854), died in childhood, and the second, Louise (1854-1929), was an artist. The family lived in Le Mans, in a house they had built near the Tucé family home.

=== Political exile in Savoy ===
Félix and Louise Milliet were both Republicans and followed the precepts of the utopian socialist Charles Fourier. Félix Milliet developed a socialism "in his own way", in which he remained bourgeois and opposed the class conflict. He expressed his ideas in songs which he had published and was elected captain of the National Guard of Le Mans.

Persecuted as were all the republicans of the Sarthe, Félix Milliet fled, with his wife and children, from the coup d'état of 2 December 1851 by Louis-Napoléon Bonaparte. They sold their properties and entrusted their youngest child, Jeanne, to her grandmother. They settled in Geneva, Switzerland, and then fled again to the mountain town of Samoëns in the Kingdom of Sardinia. In accordance with the Fourierist principle, the girls received the same education as their brothers, went to school and to religious classes. Thus, Alix Milliet went to school with the Sisters. She made her first communion in Samoëns on April 2, 1854, before the family moved again, this time to Bonneville, where the education provided was considered more complete. His little sister Jeanne, the youngest, whom his mother Louise had recently brought back to them, died in the autumn of an unidentified illness. The Milliets considered joining the Reunion phalanstery, founded in 1855 in Texas by Victor Considerant.

At the end of the decade, the Milliet family returned to Geneva, where they were allowed to stay. On September 24, 1861, Alix Milliet married Henri Payen (1836-1871), the son of Adolphe Payen, a Parisian jewelry manufacturer. She met him through her childhood friend Suzanne Reynaud (daughter of the watchmaker and jeweller Paul Alexandre Reynaud), who had married Alphonse Glatou, a close friend of Henri's and a designer for Adolphe Payen's factory. It was while following his friend to Geneva that Henri Payen met his future wife. They got married in Geneva, at the town hall and at the church. She was 19 years old, he 25.

=== Life in Paris ===
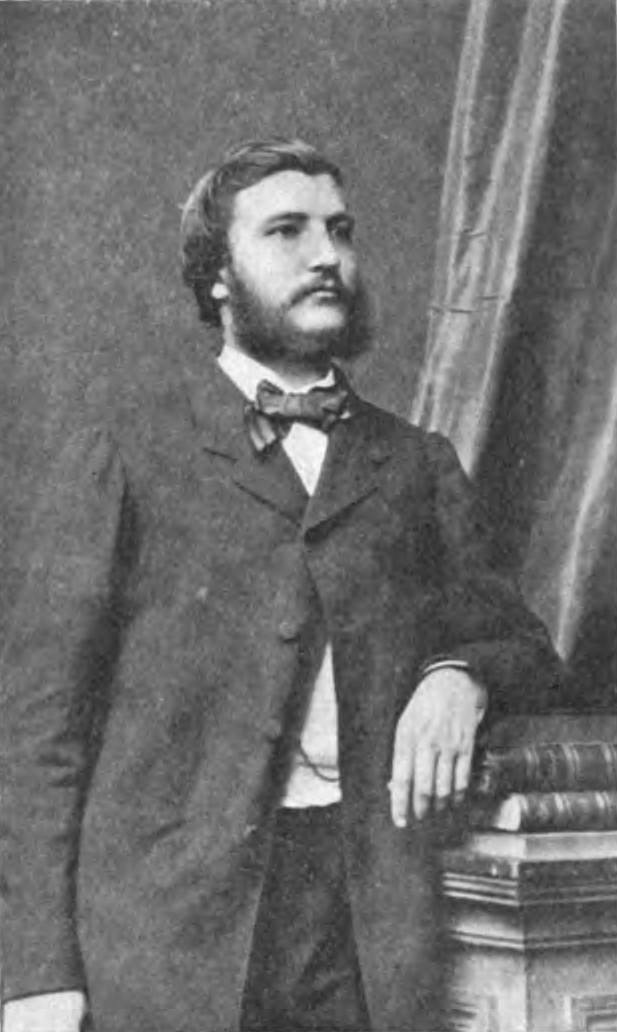
Portrait of Henri Payen.

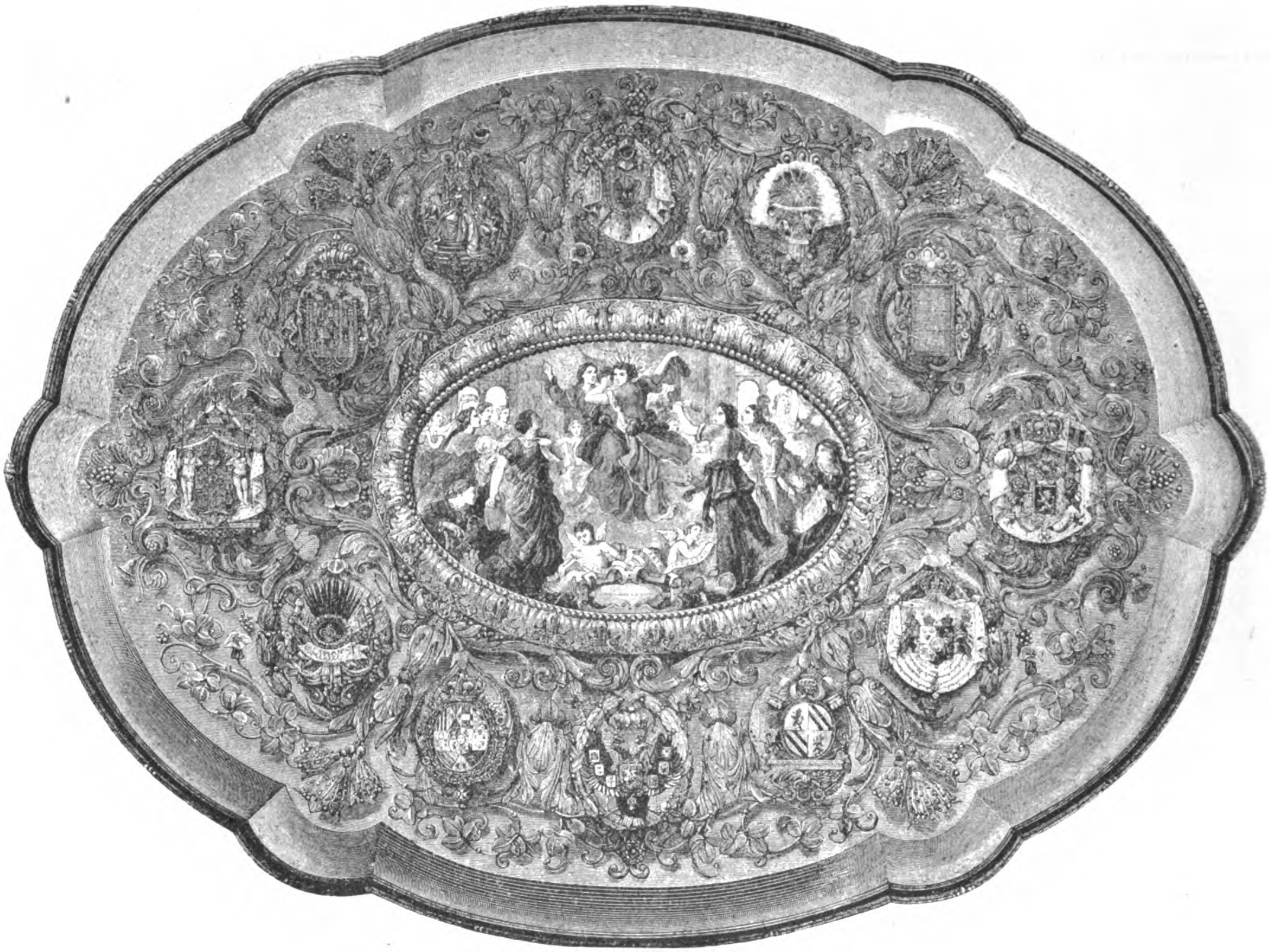
Filigree and enamel frame, created by Henri Payen and presented at the 1862 Universal Exhibition in London.

Alix and Henri Payen move to Paris and settle in the 10th arrondissement. In ten years, they moved three times. Always close to the Château d'Eau, they lived, at least until 1863, at no. 1 boulevard de Strasbourg, then in 1865 at 95 boulevard de Magenta and finally, in 1870 at 17 rue Martel.

With her husband, Alix Payen lives alone, far from her family, but remains in close contact with her mother, whom she visits and with whom she corresponds. Some time later, taking advantage of a general amnesty pronounced in 1859, the Milliet family returned to France and also took up residence in Paris, at 95 Boulevard Saint-Michel. They also took part in the life of the Colony, a Fourierist community established at Condé-sur-Vesgre in Seine-et-Oise, in the Rambouillet forest. Louise Milliet mother became the administrator.

As a jewelry craftsman, Henri Payen became self-employed. He opened his own factory, independent of his father's, with whom he had worked until then. However, in contrast to his talent as a goldsmith, he was a bad manager and squandered his wife's dowry. The dowry, which amounted to 40,000 francs at the time of the marriage in 1861, was placed with a Geneva notary in May 1862 but no longer existed ten years later. They tried to have children, without success.

== Ambulance driver for the Paris Commune ==
=== The Siege of Paris ===
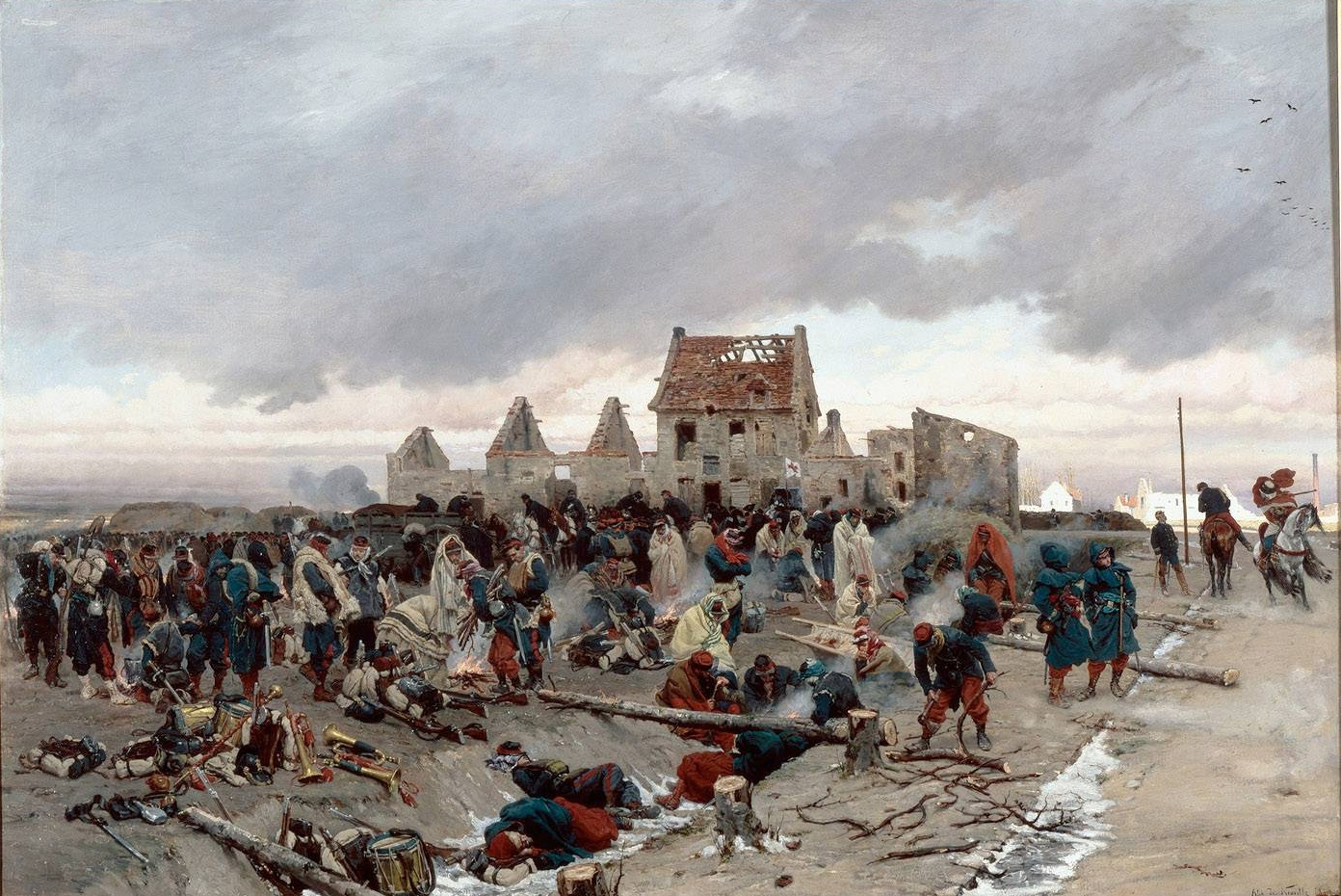
Bivouac after the battle of Le Bourget, December 21st 1870, oil on canvas by Alphonse de Neuville in 1873, kept at the Musée d'Orsay. Paul Milliet takes part in the battle of Le Bourget.

The North German Confederation and the French Second Empire of Napoleon III went to war in July 1870. This resulted in the fall of the Emperor and the siege of Paris, which began in September 1870 and ended on March 2 of the following year, and which saw the defeat of the nascent French Republic, then led by the monarchists.

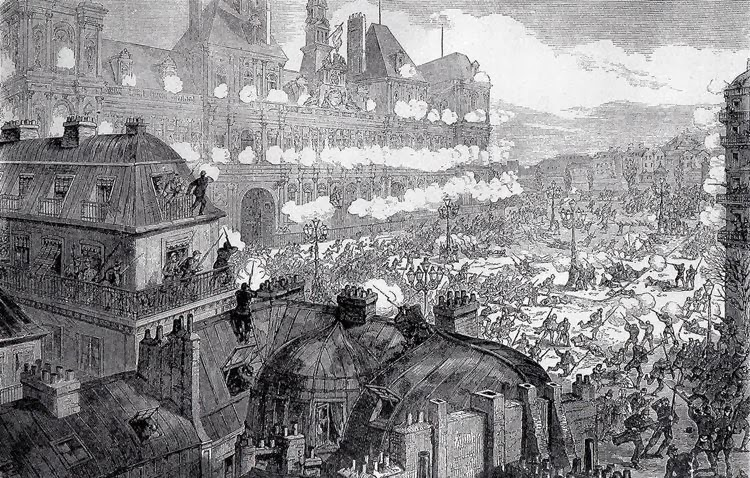
Alix Payen's mother and youngest sister witnessed the uprising of 22 January 1871. The Breton mobile guard fired from the town hall at the crowd and the National Guard.

As sergeants in the National Guard, Henri Payen and Paul Milliet, Alix Payen's younger brother, received different assignments during the siege. Paul, who had been active in combat since August in the 1st company of engineers of the Paris army, was successively posted to the Avron plateau, Pantin, Le Bourget in December and Buzenval in January. Henri Payen fought in a neighborhoods battalion, where he met his neighbors and relatives. His sister-in-law Louise reports in a letter dated January 15 that he leaves for Vitry.

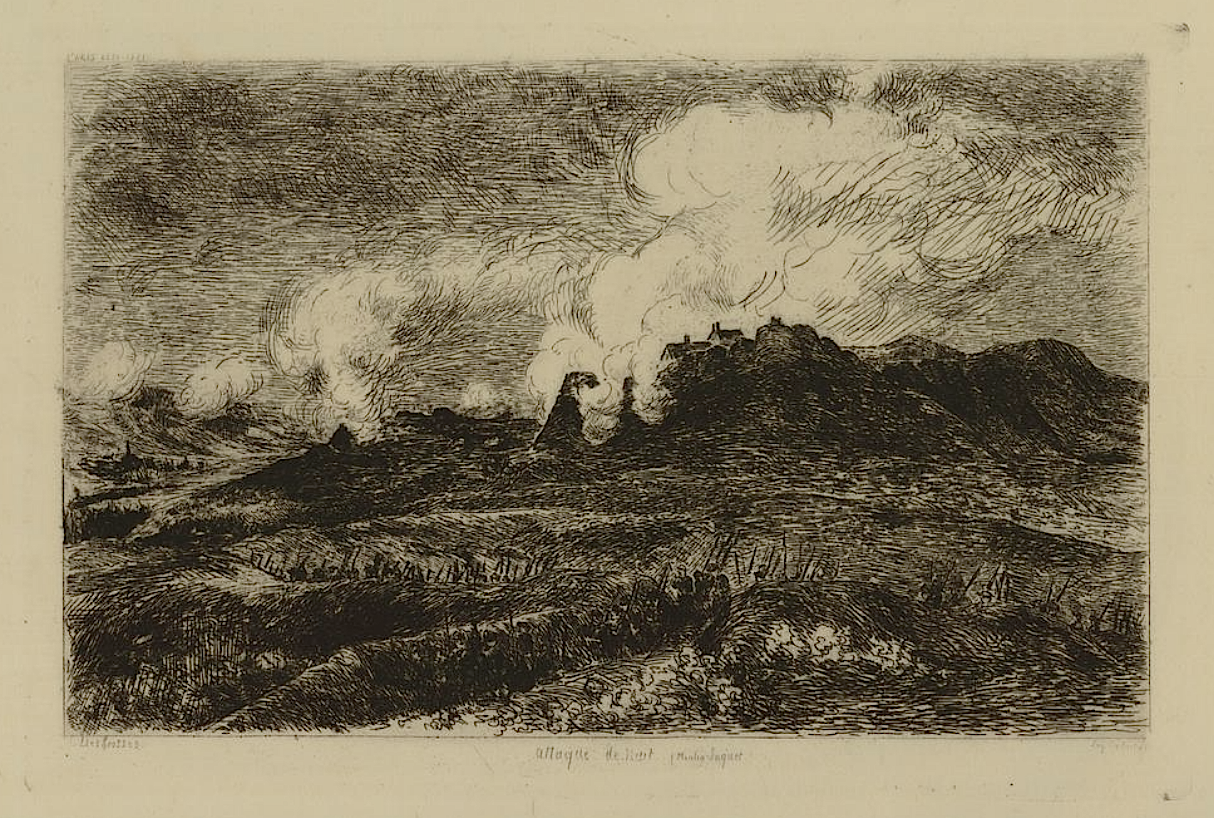
Attack by night (Moulin Saquet), aquatint by Léopold Desbrosses in 1871, in the British Museum. Representation of the war in Vitry.

From Condé-sur-Vesgre, Louise Milliet returned to Paris to be with her children, and took with her her youngest daughter, also named Louise and aged 16. On the other hand, the father, Félix Milliet, who was approaching 60 years of age, remained in the Colony. Alix Payen was already in Paris. At the back of the fighting, she was mobilized and took part in the manufacture of balaclavas.

In January 1871, her mother and youngest daughter left the Boulevard Saint-Michel, where they lived, to join her. They were fleeing the bombardments, which affected the left bank more than the right bank, and more particularly their neighborhoods. During their last move, a dozen days later, they witnessed the uprising of January 22, 1871 - in which Louise Michel participated - but which failed.

"We have been sleeping at Alix's for two nights. The night before, Mum couldn't sleep because of the noise of the shells, then everyone moved out of the house, and everyone advised us to leave. [...] Yesterday, we left our flat. [...] We fear that the cars will be overturned to make barricades. Impossible to pass by the Saint-Michel bridge, we made a big diversions, but there was a crowd of stretcher-bearers going and wounded coming back. [...] The Belleville battalion had gone to free Flourens imprisoned in Mazas. They wanted to overthrow the government and proclaim the Commune. [...] They shouted: "Down with Trochu! He was forced to resign as Governor of Paris. It was Vinoy who took his place: not much was gained by the change. [...] The Belleville battalion wanted the Commune; the Breton mobiles were defending Trochu, and they shot each other. [...] It's really sad that we kill each other among French people".

— Louise Milliet daughter, letter to her brother Paul Milliet, January 23, 1871. From the book Une famille de républicains fouriéristes by Paul Milliet.

The government of the National Defense capitulated and signed the armistice with Germany on January 28, 1871. The men returned and the family could reunite. On February 13, a pass authorized Alix Payen to go to Condé-sur-Vesgre on "family business"; it is not known whether she used it. At least part of the family returned to the Colony.

=== Life under the Paris communard ===
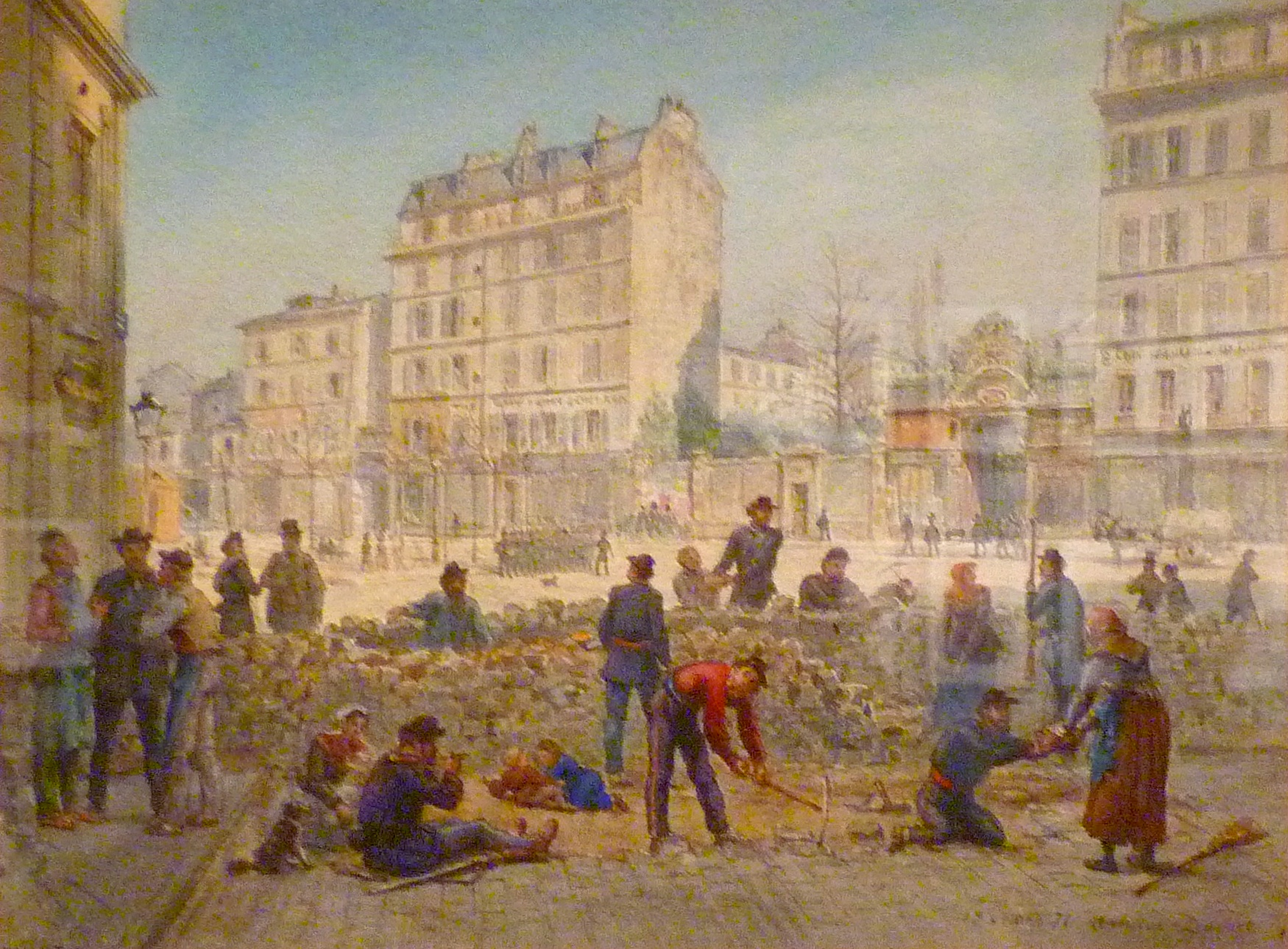
Construction of a barricade on Place Blanche on March 19, 1871, watercolour by Jean-Baptiste Arnaud-Durbec. Preserved in the Carnavalet Museum in Paris.

A fortnight after the end of the siege of Paris and the French capitulation, revolutionaries - including the Federation of the National Guard - rose up and established the Paris Commune on March 18, 1871. Elections were held on March 26 and an elected Commune Council was established on March 28. As the Milliet and Payen families are together, they do not write to each other. We do not know what they did during the two months of February and March, nor where they lived, nor what their vision of the latest events was.

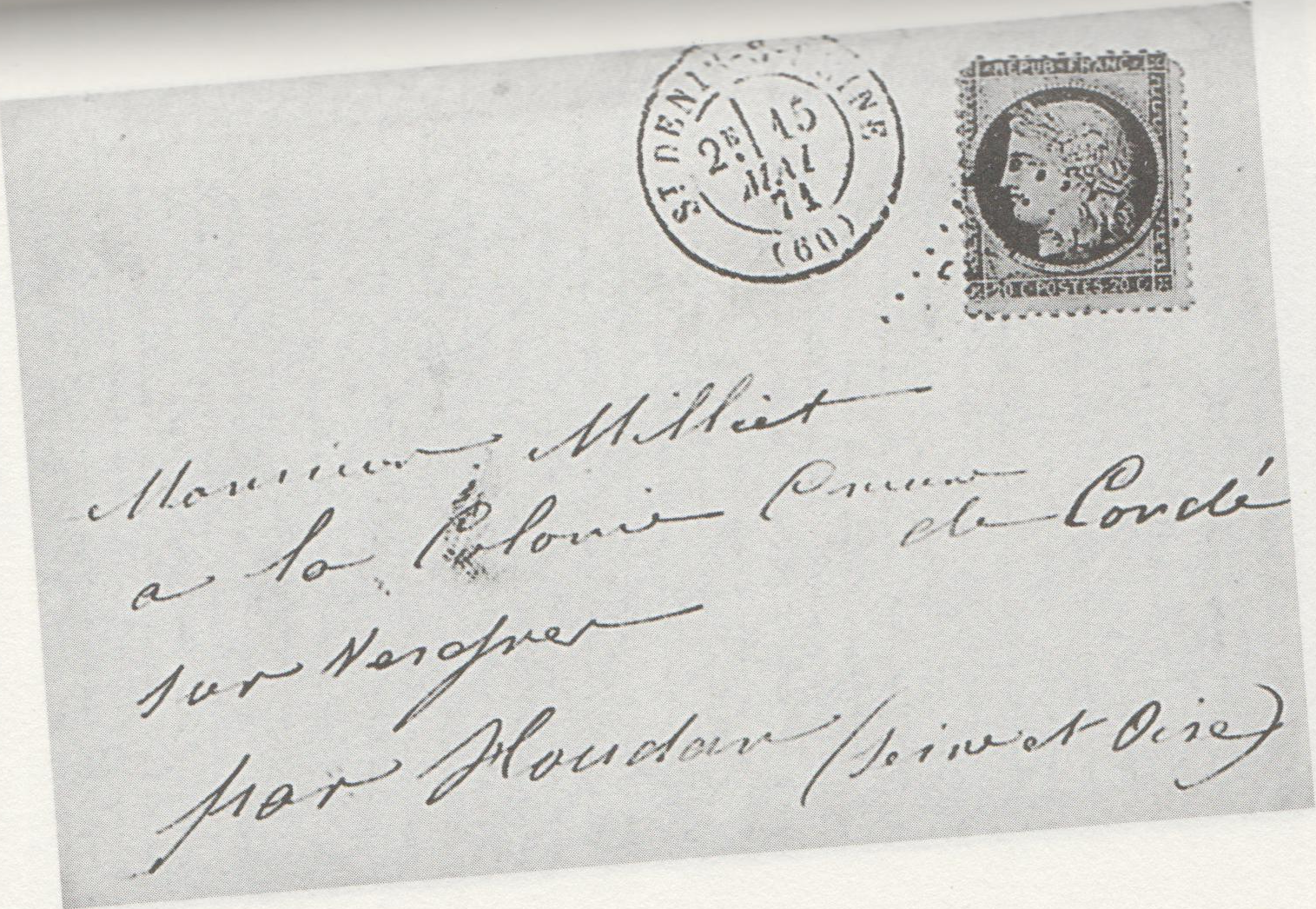
Letter addressed to Félix Milliet, passed in Saint-Denis on May 15, 1871.

Their correspondence resumed in April, between Paris, where Alix Payen, her husband, her mother, her brother and her sister were based, and the Colonie de Condé-sur-Vesgre where Félix Milliet was once again alone. The transmission of mail between the territories controlled by the Commune and those under the domination of the Germans or the regular French army was difficult. If the transport of letters sent from Paris was ensured by Albert Theisz, administrator of the postal services during the insurrectionary period, via Saint-Denis, the reverse correspondence was much more complex.

In Paris, the Milliets, republicans and patriots, took the side of the partisans of the Commune, called Communards or Fédérés. Henri Payen and Paul Milliet took up arms, the former in the 153rd battalion of the Xth legion, the latter in the 1st engineering battalion. Alix's mother and sister, accompanied by Marie Delbruck (daughter of the forty-eighter and then Communard Joseph Louis Delbruck), regularly visited the wounded soldiers in the Luxembourg ambulance, where those of the 153rd battalion were taken; the ambulance was moved to Saint-Sulpice in May. At the Colony, Félix Milliet reports a carefree atmosphere, where people danced and celebrated.

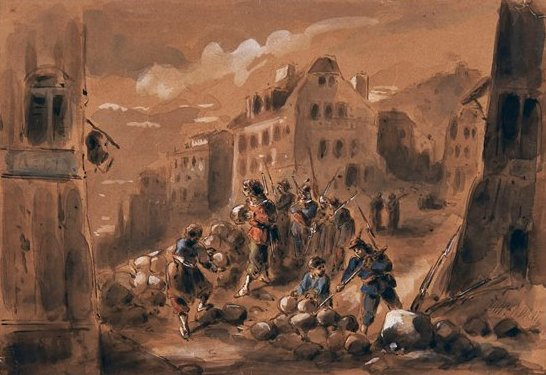
A barricade of women in the faubourg Rochechouard (sic), brown ink and gouache drawing by Alexandre Dupendant. Held in the Musée d'Art et d'Histoire de Saint-Denis.

"Those abominable communitarians solemnly burned the guillotine the other day. You see how bloodthirsty they are. They are superb in their enthusiasm and conviction, all these battalions.

[...] I spend my time running after [Henri's battalion] which is often sent to one side or the other; there are so many wounded or dead who have not been recognised by their families that I always want to know where Henri will be sent to be able to look after him if he is in need.

[...] If you only knew how happy I would be to join you there [at the Colony]! [...] But you understand that this is not the time to leave Henri there".

— Alix Payen, letter to her father Félix Milliet, April 10, 1871.

=== Alix Payen's commitment ===
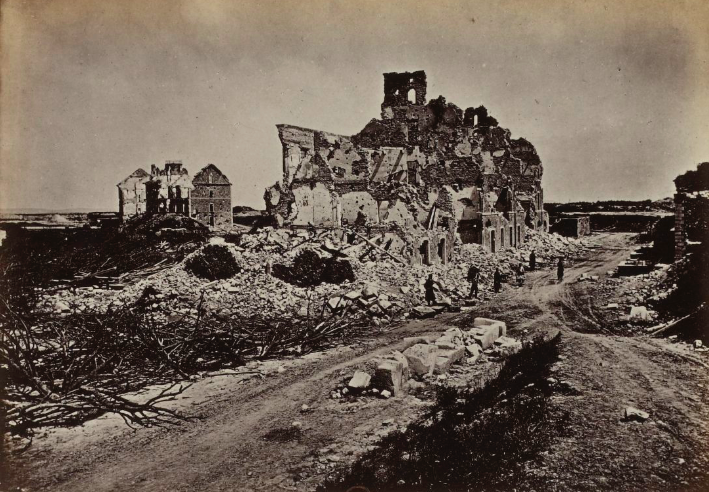
The fort at Issy destroyed by Versailles bombardment, photograph by Alphonse Liébert. "One by one [the shells] dismantled the pieces of the fort at Issy. One can see the baskets filled with earth jump into the air, then some sections of wall collapse with noise", 27th or 28 April.

Fighting broke out near Paris in the first days of April 1871, pitting Commune supporters against Versailles troops, who were responding to the "chief executive" of the new republic, Adolphe Thiers. Henri Payen remained in the barracks and Alix Payen visited him regularly.

When he was deployed with his battalion to Fort Issy, south-west of Paris, on the 15th of the same month, she wanted to join him. To do so, she acquired medical supplies and managed to persuade the authorities to let her join the battlefield with the men. She obtained an ambulance driver's license, a position - like that of canteen maid - usually given to soldiers' wives. She joined the 153rd Battalion the following day, April 16, 1871.

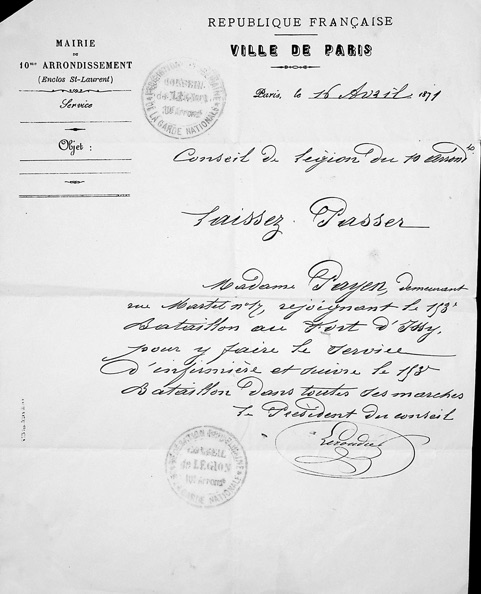
Pass of April 16, 1871.

"Dear Mother, You are surprised, aren't you, to receive a letter from me dated Issy?

[...] I am astonished to have made so many decisions on my own. [...] Yesterday, Sunday, I left early to pay a visit to my fat man [at the Prince-Eugène barracks], but when I arrived [...] they had left during the night for Issy. "This is the moment, I thought, to put my plan into effect, my dream of being an ambulance driver in Henri's battalion and following him everywhere. I ran to the town hall and asked M. S. [M. Salomon, delegate to the council of the tenth legion29,47]. He found a thousand objections to make to me, obstacles without number, but I nevertheless ended up convincing him.

[...] At Issy we were told that our battalion was camped in the cemetery. We went there, but on foot. [...] Mr S. took me there very reluctantly and often told me that there was still time to change my mind".

— Alix Payen, letter to her mother Louise Milliet, April 17, 1871.

On the battlefield, Alix Payen shares the difficult living conditions of the soldiers. Together, they camped in an unprotected cemetery, taking shelter in mausoleums in the pouring rain, and the relentless Versailles bombardment. At first she worked in Beatrix Excoffon's ambulance. She provided her first treatment on the day of her arrival, on her husband, who had been wounded in the eye, and by assisting the doctor with the amputation of a soldier called Deshayes.

=== The combats ===
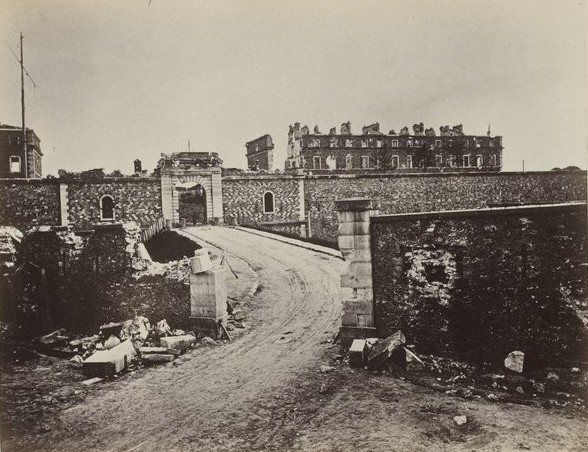
The fort of Vanves at the end of the wars of 1870 and 1871, photograph by Alphonse Liébert.

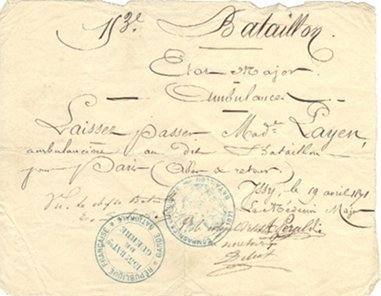
Pass of April 19, 1871 in Issy.

As soon as he arrived at the Issy cemetery, Alix Payen witnessed the battles. During the night of the 17 to 18 April, the Versaillais tried several times to attack the fort, and were each time repulsed by the Fédérés. The camp of the 153rd battalion was moved in the days that followed to an annex of the Oiseaux convent, located in the village of Issy.

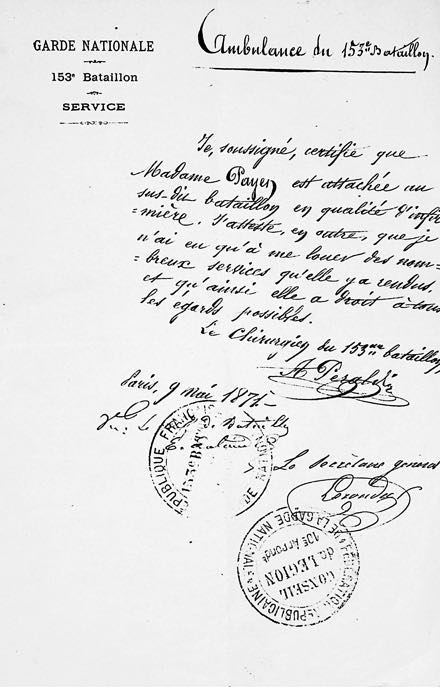
Certificate confirming Alix Payen's status as a nurse in the 153rd Battalion, dated May 9, 1871.

On 19th or 20 April, Alix Payen visited her mother in Paris intra-muros. She found her battalion in the trenches of Vanves Fort, where it stayed for three days. On the evening of April 23, after sleeping outside for nine nights, the battalion mutinied and returned to the fort for the night. Alix Payen describes in her letters a fort in ruins, where "there are not two rooms where water does not penetrate. [...] No straw, our blankets were too wet to be used; in short, our night was not much better than in the trench. In the morning, the legion commander Maxime Lisbonne decided to take the battalion to the trenches at Montrouge; the soldiers protested again and managed to settle in the Oiseaux building.

In her ambulance, Alix Payen was faced with a severe lack of medical supplies, but also with the departure of several volunteers who could not stand the conditions. She relates going to relieve the wounded between the allied and enemy trenches under enemy fire. She also sometimes helps in the kitchen.

On the evening of April 26, Henri Payen organised a concert at the Oiseaux annex to raise the morale of the troops. A poet, Paul Parelon, declaims his verses. Mrs. Mallet, the canteen maid, sang a few songs. However, the lull was short-lived. During the night, the battalion was moved to the trenches of Clamart where it took part in the fighting. At the same time, the fort at Issy was bombed and twenty-six Federals were killed or wounded. For its part, the 153rd battalion saw the death of one of its own, Henry Mallet (husband of Mrs. Mallet), and withdrew to Paris to bury him.

There followed a short period during which neither the battalion nor Alix Payen's whereabouts are known. Family letters show that on May 2, she is in Paris where she spends a total of ten days. She visited her mother and was called back to the barracks on May 9. There, the medical officer of her battalion, A. Peraldi, issued her with a certificate of her status as a nurse, in which he stated that he had "only to praise her for the many services she has rendered, and that she is therefore entitled to all possible consideration". Probably at the same time, an order emanating from the head of the battalion, Émile Lalande, ordered "Sergeant Payen to arrest and take the National Guards to the Prince Eugène barracks immediately".

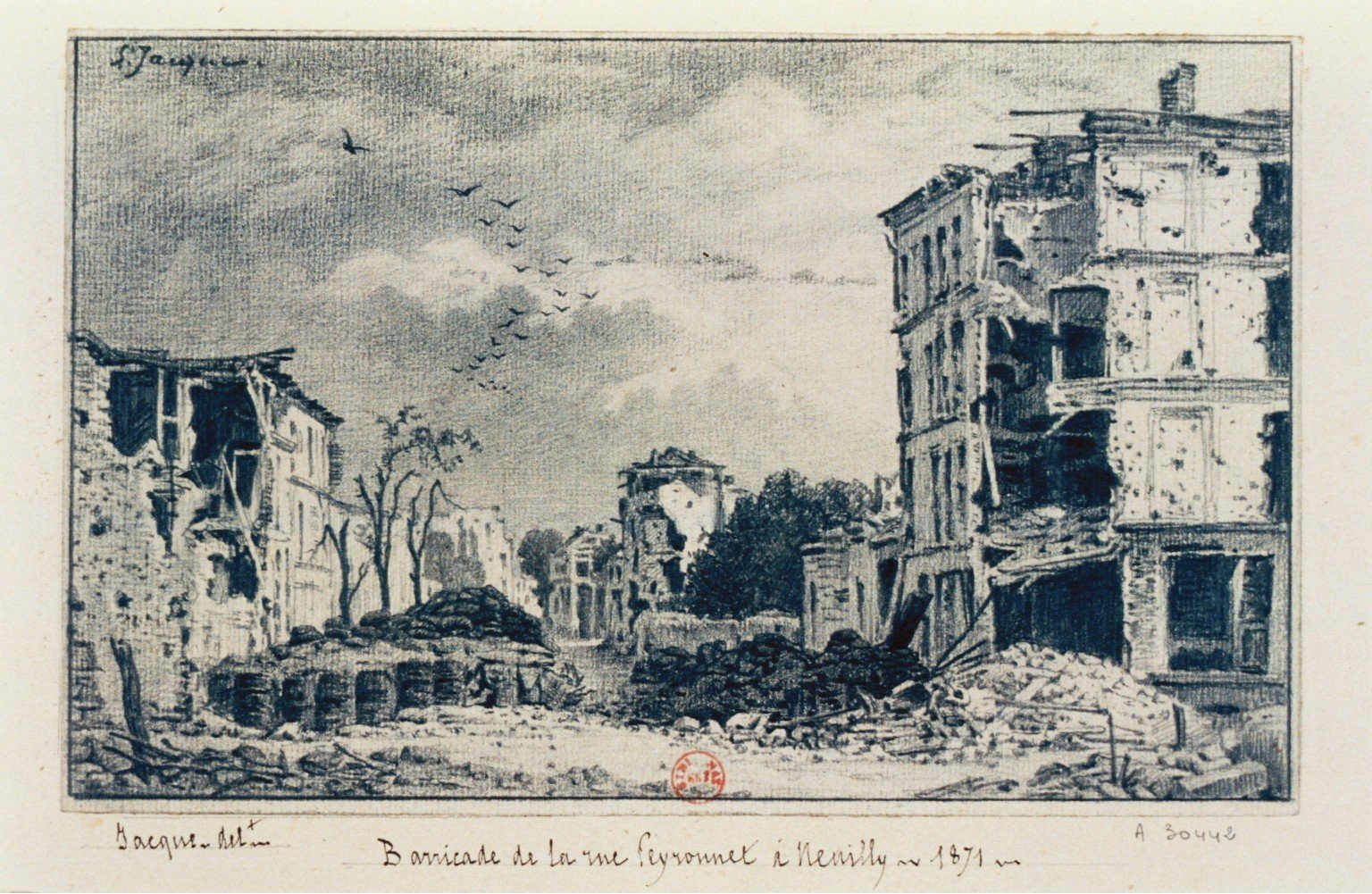
Barricade on rue Peyronnet in Neuilly in 1871, graphite drawing by Léon Jacque.

In the meantime, the fort at Issy fell on May 9. The 153rd battalion was sent to Levallois. Alix Payen left around May 11. During the night of the 12th to the 13th, the battalion was mobilised and fought at Neuilly, where she described in her letters the systematic destruction of the houses on Mont Valérien by Versailles artillery. The day after, it was rested for two days before resuming the fighting. While Alix Payen had been working alone with Doctor Peraldi until then, four new ambulance drivers joined her on May 13. Reluctantly, she took them under her command; in the end, it was planned that they would each go to a different battalion. However, two of them, too afraid, asked to return to Paris the next day.

=== Death of Henri Payen and end of the Commune ===
Around May 19, Henri Payen was seriously wounded in the hand and thigh by a piece of shrapnel that went right through it. He retired to Paris with Alix Payen. With her husband repatriated, Alix Payen's involvement in the Communist war ended. From then on, she took care of him.

"Dear mother, [...] Isn't it a pity we can't be together at a time like this!

[...] The finger cannot be preserved. Today [the surgeon] is going to put something on it to get the splinters out. The other two wounds frightened him. He put a probe in one that disappeared down to 18 centimetres. He believes it was the same splinter that went through. [...] This doctor recommends extreme cleanliness. You have to change the cloths often and you know that it is not easy, but I will take care of it, because the smell is already horrible.

Yesterday this dressing made him very tired, and the fever was quite violent. The doctor wants him to eat as little as possible, and the poor fat man feels the need; nothing but a little soup increases his fever.

[...] I don't go out. [I have blackness, I assure you, and I am in mortal anxiety".

— Alix Payen, undated letter to his mother, taken from Cahiers de la Quinzaine.

"Dear Mother, I don't know if you are in Paris or with father. Come back soon, Henry is dying. I doubt you will see him again. It's terrible! Please come. Yesterday the doctors warned me".

— Alix Payen, letter to her mother on May 28 or 29, 1871.

Henri Payen died of tetanus ten days after being wounded, on 29 May at five o'clock in the evening, at the age of 35; the day after the capitulation of the Commune. It was Paul Milliet, his brother-in-law, who declared his death. The funeral took place on 30 May in a small committee, according to the family biography written by the latter.

"Alix is in despair. [...] Here is a child, my friend, who is going home. [...] I would like to take Alix away as soon as possible, but I don't want to leave anyone behind, I want to take them all away".

— Louise Milliet mother, letter to her husband Félix Milliet, May 30, 1871.

At the same time, the Commune was defeated by the Versailles army. On May 21, the latter entered Paris; the Boulevard Saint-Michel was taken on the 24th. The Communards experienced a bloody repression from May 21 to 28 and the last of them capitulated the next day. They were arrested, executed or condemned to deportation by the council of war. However, the Milliets managed to escape: on the day of the funeral, May 30, Louise Milliet mother obtained a Versailles pass from one of Henri's relatives, an officer in the victorious army. She brought her two daughters and her son back to her on June 1, and together they left for Rambouillet in the direction of the Condé-sur-Vesgre colony.

== Life after the Commune ==
=== Small jobs in arts ===
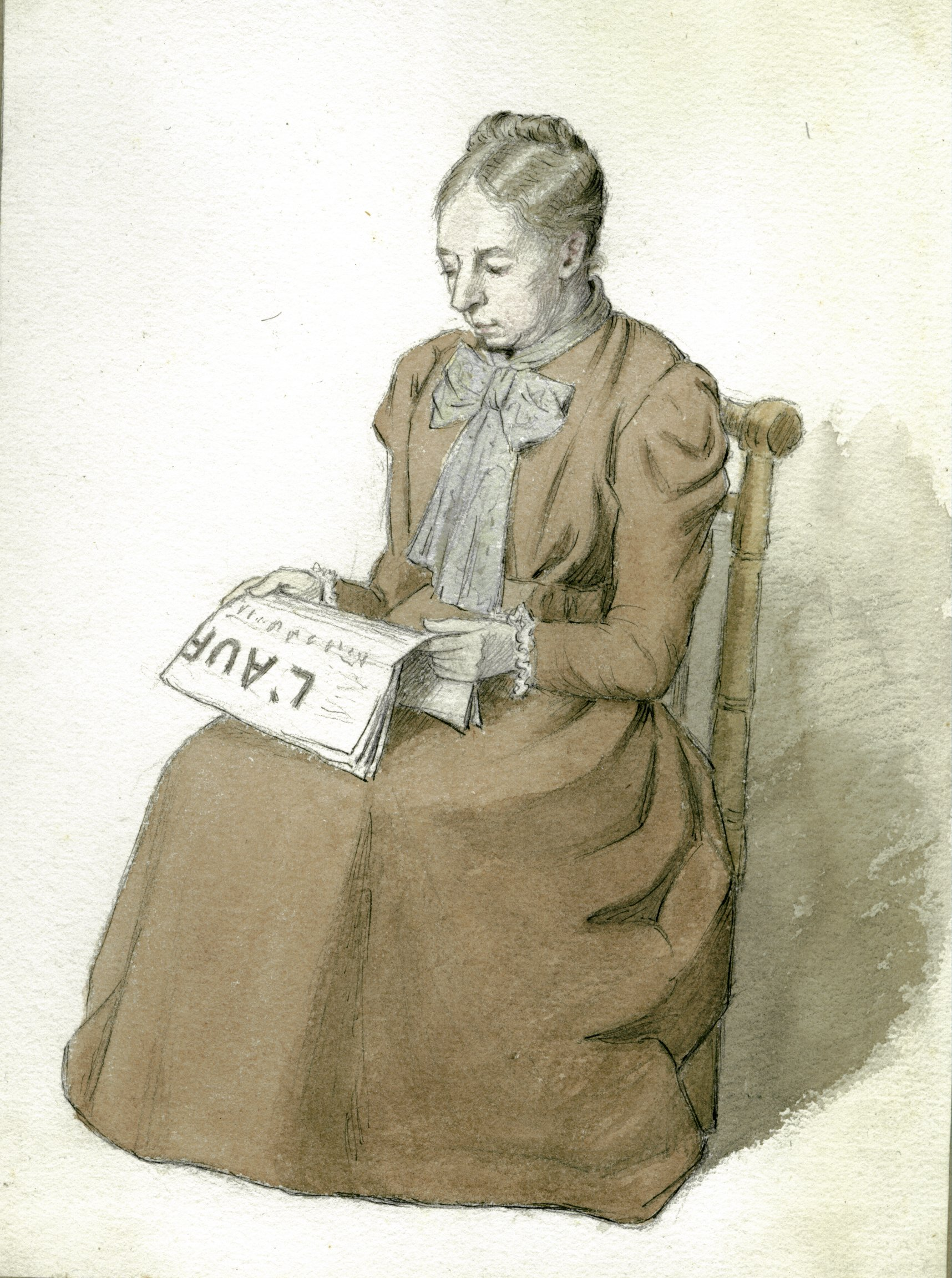
Alix Payen reading L'Aurore.

After the events of the Commune, Alix Payen was a widow without a fortune. She had lost her dowry, her husband's business having been a failure. She returned to live with her mother, on Boulevard Saint-Michel, where her sister Louise also lived. Her family then wanted to remarry her. In 1873 she was to marry Édouard Lockroy, a journalist and member of the Radical Party, who was to become a minister, but the project fell through after he was sentenced to prison for his writings in Le Rappel.

In order to support herself, Alix Payen tried to reconvert to art, an activity already practised by her brother Paul - who made a career in it - by her father and her younger sister. She worked as a photographic colourist. She worked in Nadar's studio, colouring photographs of paintings in museums. She receives an order for twenty francs from an Englishwoman, who spotted her copying a painting by Amaury-Duval in the Musée du Luxembourg. She also painted watercolours, some of which were copies of paintings exhibited in the Louvre. In 1873, she entered a competition with Louise Milliet to become a drawing teacher, without success. A few years later, she painted fans. However, these works were not very lucrative.

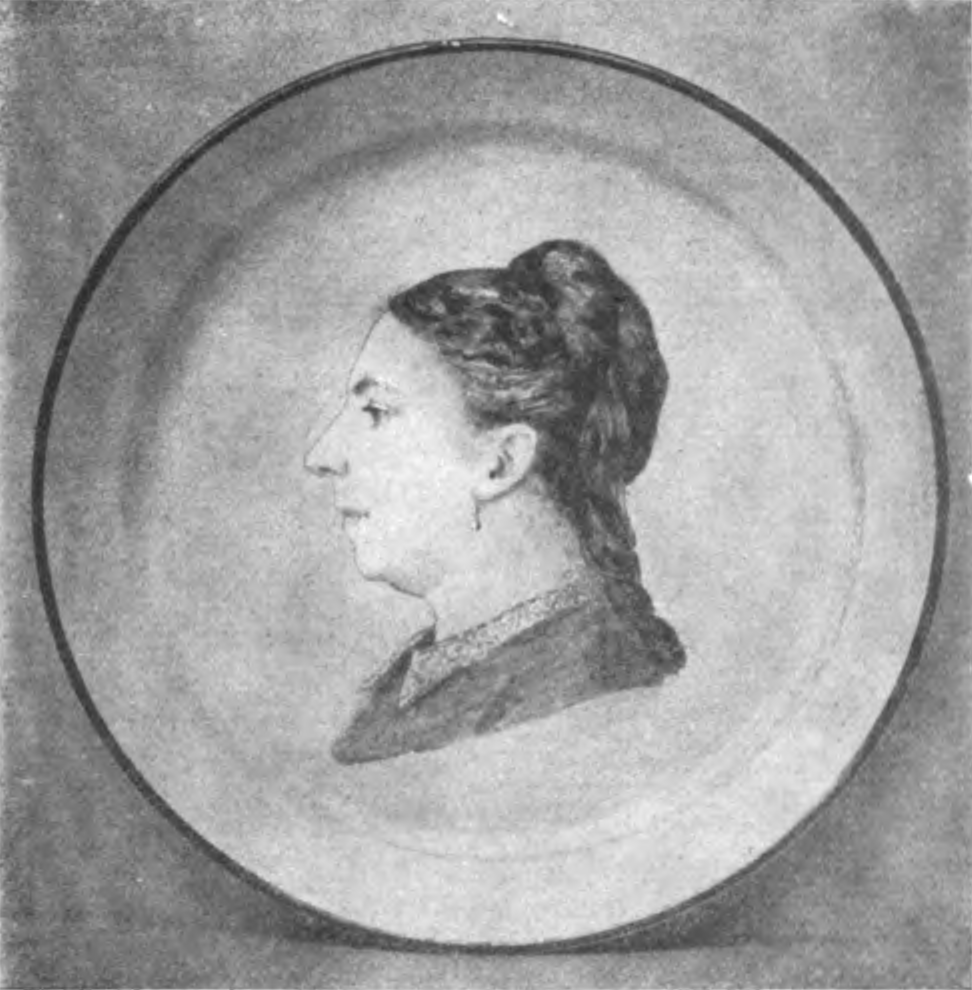
Faience portrait of Alix Payen by her sister.

In the family biography, her brother Paul Milliet wrote: "Alix Payen, not being married under the community property regime, could have saved her dowry; she abandoned it to her husband's creditors. Completely ruined [...], on returning to her parents' home, she wanted to earn a living by her work. First she worked for Nadar, then for Goupil, retouching photographs. Later, she managed to sell some copies of paintings, which she painted in watercolours in museums. In January 1873, in a letter, their mother: "While waiting for something better, Alix paints photographs on salt paper with watercolours. Everyone finds them charming, but no one buys them.

=== Settling in the Colony with her family ===
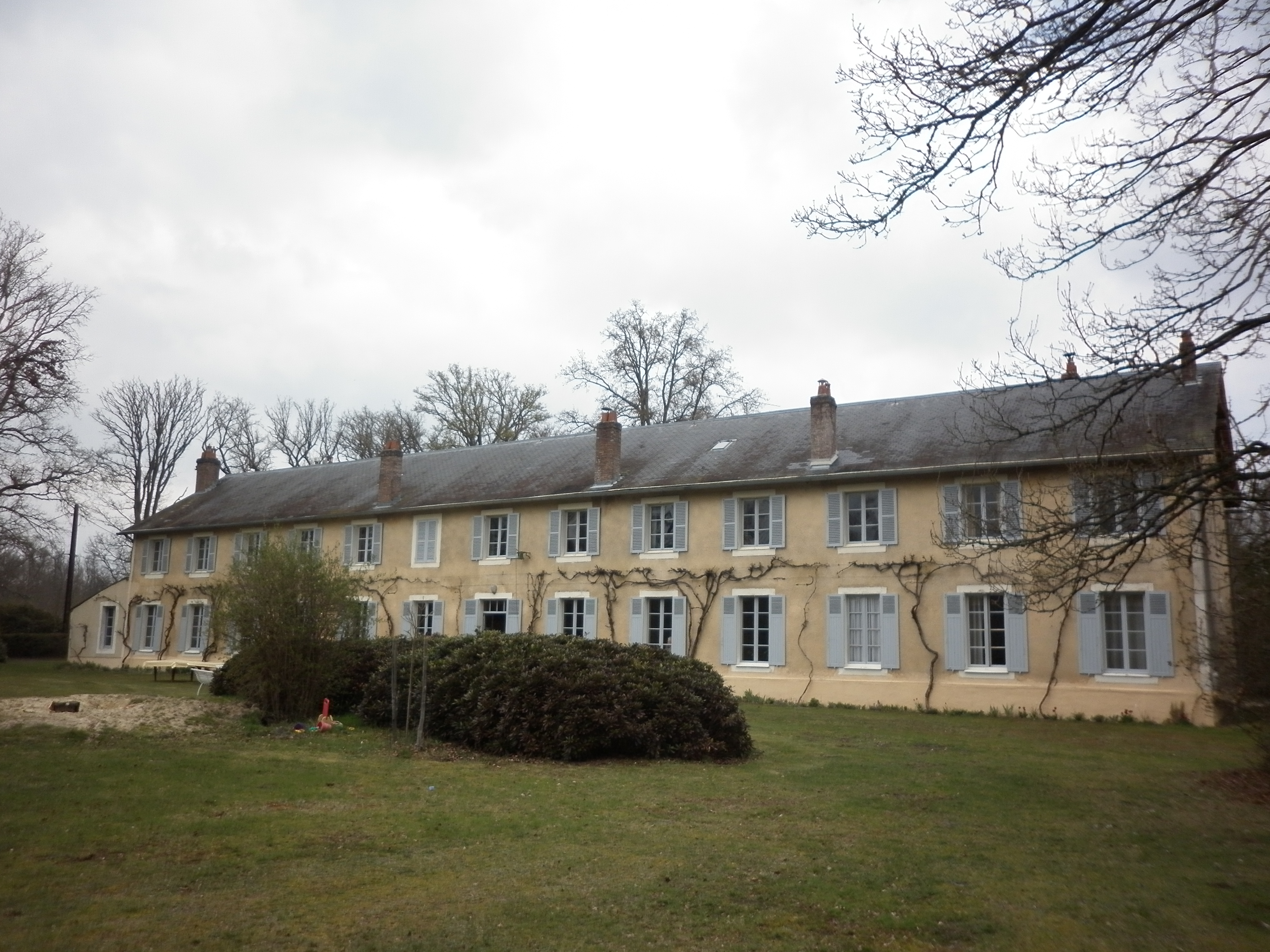
The main building of the Colony, in Condé-sur-Vesgre.

Alix Payen married for a second time in the early 1880s. On April 2, 1880, she was married in church to Louis Gustave Poisson, collector of the octroi at the Paris wine market. She was widowed a second time two years later. She left Paris and settled in the phalanstery Colonie de Condé-sur-Vesgre, where her family lived. The colonists lived on games, walks, art, gardening and conversation. For two years, from 1886 to 1888, Alix Payen kept a notebook in which she recounted their lives and copied her past correspondence with her mother. She did this in order to tell her personal story, without wanting to go beyond the family circle.

Her elder brother Fernand died in 1885, and she maintained a close relationship with his widow Euphémie Barbier (1844-1903), who lived in Brains in the Sarthe. The latter's family, also from Manche, Fourierists and exiled in 1851, were long-time friends of the Milliets and sometimes visited the Colony. (Note: Euphémie Éléonore Barbier (1844-1903) was the daughter of Jacques François Barbier (1811-1888), a doctor from Le Mans, who was exiled after the Coup of December 2, 1851 and then returned to Le Mans in 1872, where he became involved in local political life. Euphémie Barbier married Fernand Milliet on October 26, 1872, in Amné in a religious marriage; he died in 1885.) In 1887, Alix Payen testifies in her memoirs that she took daily "lessons in Fourierism" from a fervent member of the Condé Society, Julien Chassevant. Alix Payen also frequently visited her father Félix Milliet. He died in 1888 and his wife followed him five years later.

Following the death of their parents, Alix Payen, Paul Milliet and Louise Milliet, who became Hubert's wife, represent the second generation of the Milliet family; they are all reunited at the Colonie. Alix Payen took charge of the education of Sabine Hubert (1881-1968), her sister's eldest child, whom she had living with her. Their relationship continued outside the Colony, through weekly correspondence, after Sabine's marriage in 1900 to the zoologist Maurice Caullery.

Alix Payen died in Paris on December 24, 1903, at the age of 61.

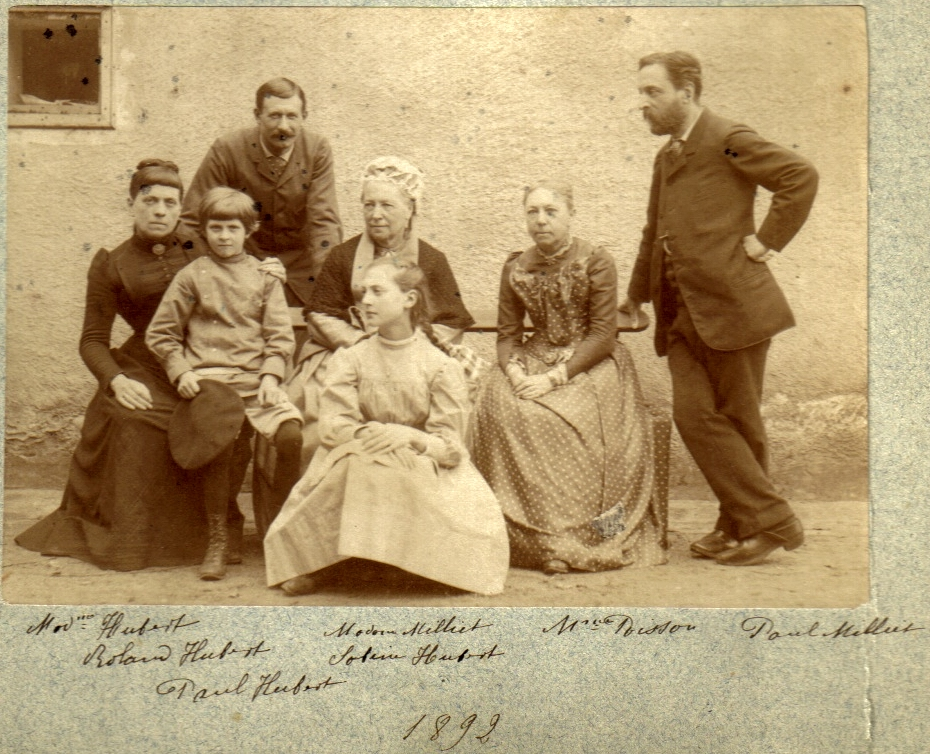
Family photo from 1892. From left to right: Louise Milliet, her son Roland, her husband Paul Hubert, her daughter Sabine, their mother Louise Milliet, Alix Payen (under the name Poisson) and Paul Milliet.

== Epistolary testimony ==
During the wars of 1870 and 1871, Alix Payen wrote regularly to her mother, who lived on the other bank of the Seine, and to her father, who lived in Seine-et-Oise. She also kept a diary. The last letter is dated May 28 or 29 and the last entry in the diary is dated May 29, the day Henri died. Her writings, a rare contemporary testimony to the Commune, were published several times after her death but remain little known.

=== A rare and little-known testimony ===
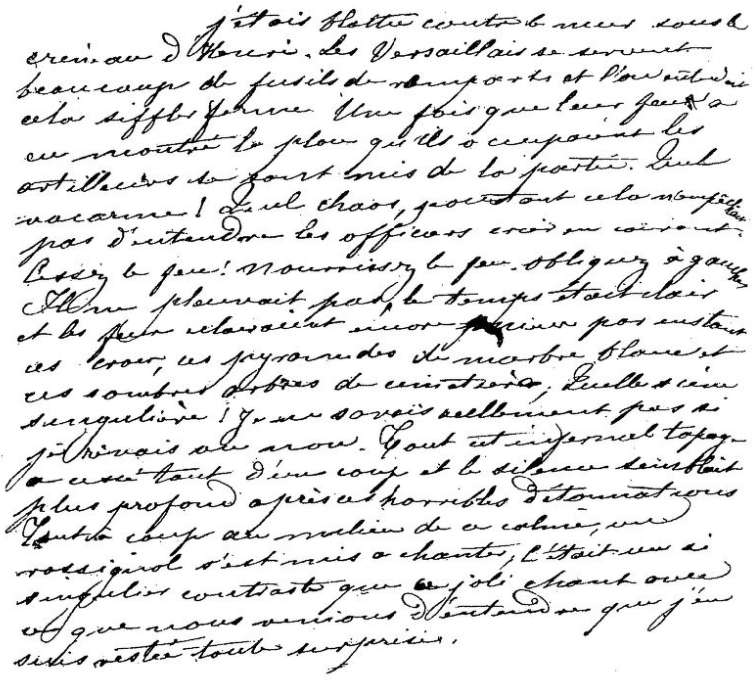
Fragment of a letter from Alix Payen, dated April 16, copied in ink in his memoirs.

Contemporary testimonies of the Communards are rare. This is because the repression they suffered did not allow them to preserve their writings, but also because of their limited writing skills and the short existence of the Communard. The epistolary conversation that Alix Payen maintained with his family during the insurrectionary events is therefore perceived by Michèle Audin (Note: Author of a collection of letters by Alix Payen.) and Bernard Guyon (Note: Bernard Guyon (1904-1975) was a French professor of French literature, a specialist in Charles Péguy.) as an "exceptional" and "remarkable" testimony, particularly with regard to the details of the defence of Paris besieged by the Versaillais.

Despite this specificity, Alix Payen's name is not well known and only benefits from a few citations. Michèle Audin speculates on the invisibility of her existence and that of her writings - even though Édith Thomas had mentioned her in her book Les Pétroleuses - and on the fact that Alix Payen does not correspond to the stereotypes constructed by the Versaillais or those of historians specialising in the Commune. A woman of bourgeois origin, she was not active, nor was she a member of any club or organisation such as the International Workers' Association or the Women's Union for the Defence of Paris and the Care of the Wounded, nor did she use her pen in the newspapers, nor, unlike the canteen worker Victorine Brocher, did she have a memoir published.

=== Posthumous releases ===
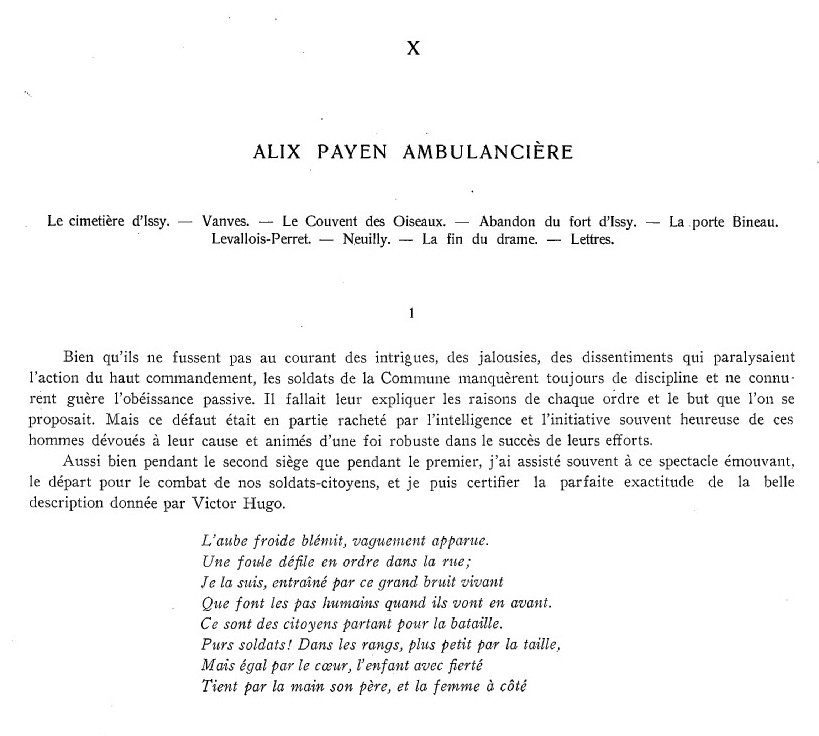
Chapter "Alix Payen ambulancière" in the second volume of Une famille de républicains fouriéristes, les Milliet, published in 1916.

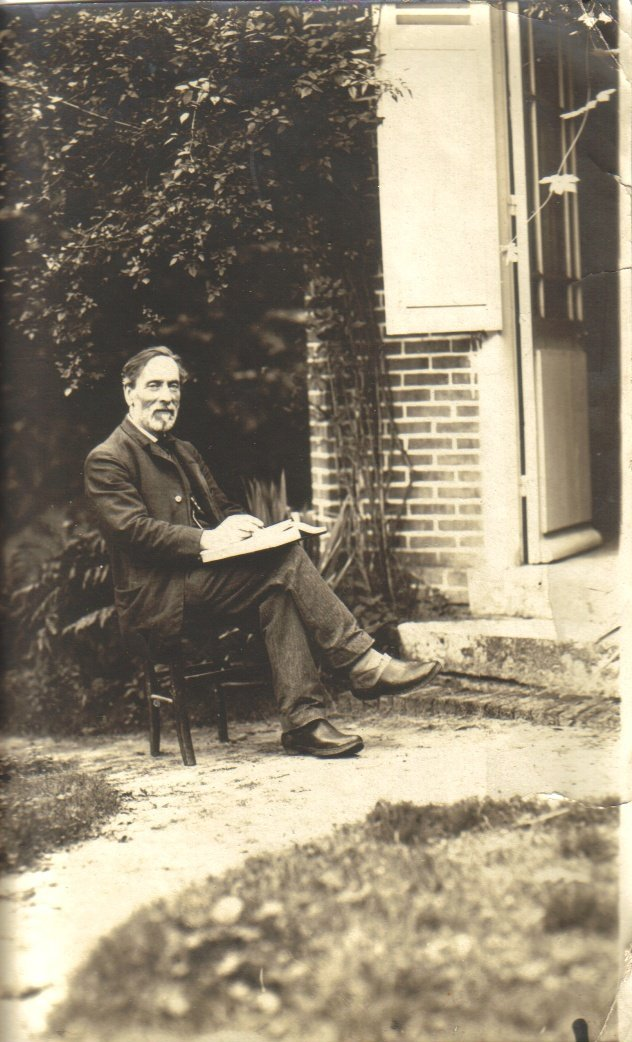
Paul Milliet, brother of Alix Payen and author of the family biography.

Alix Payen's letters did not appear until after her death. They were taken out of the family circle by her brother Paul Milliet, when he included them in a family biography published in Charles Péguy's magazine Cahiers de la Quinzaine from 1910 to 1911, in which Alix Payen, along with her sister Louise Milliet, played a large part. Four years later, he brought together all of these chapters in a two-volume work, Une famille de républicains fouriéristes, les Milliet, which he had published by Georges Crès. Even though he reworked some of the letters, he gave them a prominent place in the chapter dedicated to the Commune battles, to the point that they alone constitute the narrative and that Paul Miliet intervenes only to specify the historical context.

Some sixty years later, in 1978, François Maspero, founder of the éditions Maspero (now La Découverte), republished Alix Payen's letters in their Cahiers de la Quinzaine version. They were included in an anthology entitled Mémoires de femmes mémoire du peuple, which he published under the pseudonym Louis Constant in his "Petite collection Maspero". It is in this form that they were discovered by Michèle Audin, who, from 2018 to 2019, published some of them on her blog macommunedeparis.com. (Note: Read Michèle Audin's blog posts about Alix Payen online.) She presents them in a new version that she describes as "mixed", derived from the two sources of Paul Milliet. After having had access to the family archives of the descendants of Louise Milliet's daughter, held by Danielle Duizabo, she had them published, with many unpublished works, by Libertalia in 2020, under the title C'est la nuit surtout que le combat devient furieux.

Michèle Audin's publication appears on the eve of the centenary of the Commune. In the year of the anniversary, Alix Payen's writings were published again in the anthology by Jordi Brahamcha-Marin and Alice de Charentenay, La Commune des écrivains, published by éditions Gallimard. A tribute is also paid to her by the street-artist Dugudus in his series of portraits of Nous la Commune exhibited in Paris - accompanied by a portrait in L'Humanité - as well as by the historian Ludivine Bantigny, who addresses a correspondence to her "beyond time" in her book La Commune au présent.

=== Contents of Alix Payen's letters in battle ===
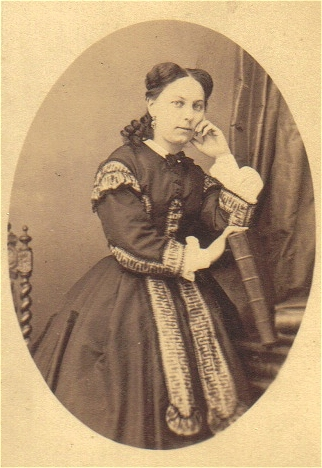
Portrait of Alix Payen.

In her letters, Alix Payen offers a concrete vision of the harsh life of the Communards in combat. She recounts the lack of food and equipment, the rough management of the troops, as well as the good relations she established with her comrades of the 153rd battalion, whom she describes at length. Addressed to friends and family who knew her opinions, she does not dwell on her political views: secular and anticlerical, republican and patriotic.

She recounts the difficult nights in the trenches, between the cold and the damp. The bombardments and the exchange of fire sometimes prevented her from sleeping. The rain did not stop during the month of April; she testified on 24 April that she "never thought you could get used to living all wet for days without ever drying out". The battalion was constantly exposed to enemy fire, although there were a few lulls, but in devastated buildings that were only precarious shelters. Thus, she describes, still on 24 April, a night at the Vanves fort which is no better than those spent outside. The food they were given was insufficient, so they went to glean in the surrounding fields.

The situation is no better in combat, where it describes significant shortcomings. The Federals were equipped with poor quality weapons and suffered from approximate replacements as well as random and dangerous movements between the various posts. In this regard, she wrote on 24 April: "When we left Issy [for Vanves], an order had been read to us stating that from now on the advanced posts would be relieved every 24 hours, in spite of this we stayed three days in this cesspool. In the ambulance, she reported a lack of supplies and medical aid.

"The ambulance does not keep the wounded; they are taken quickly to Paris after the first dressing. [...] The beds are bad and there is a lack of medicine; there is all that is needed for surgery, but no other remedies, so one of our men is devoured by fever and for the last four days the major has not been able to get any quinine".

— Alix Payen, letter to her mother on April 24, 1871.

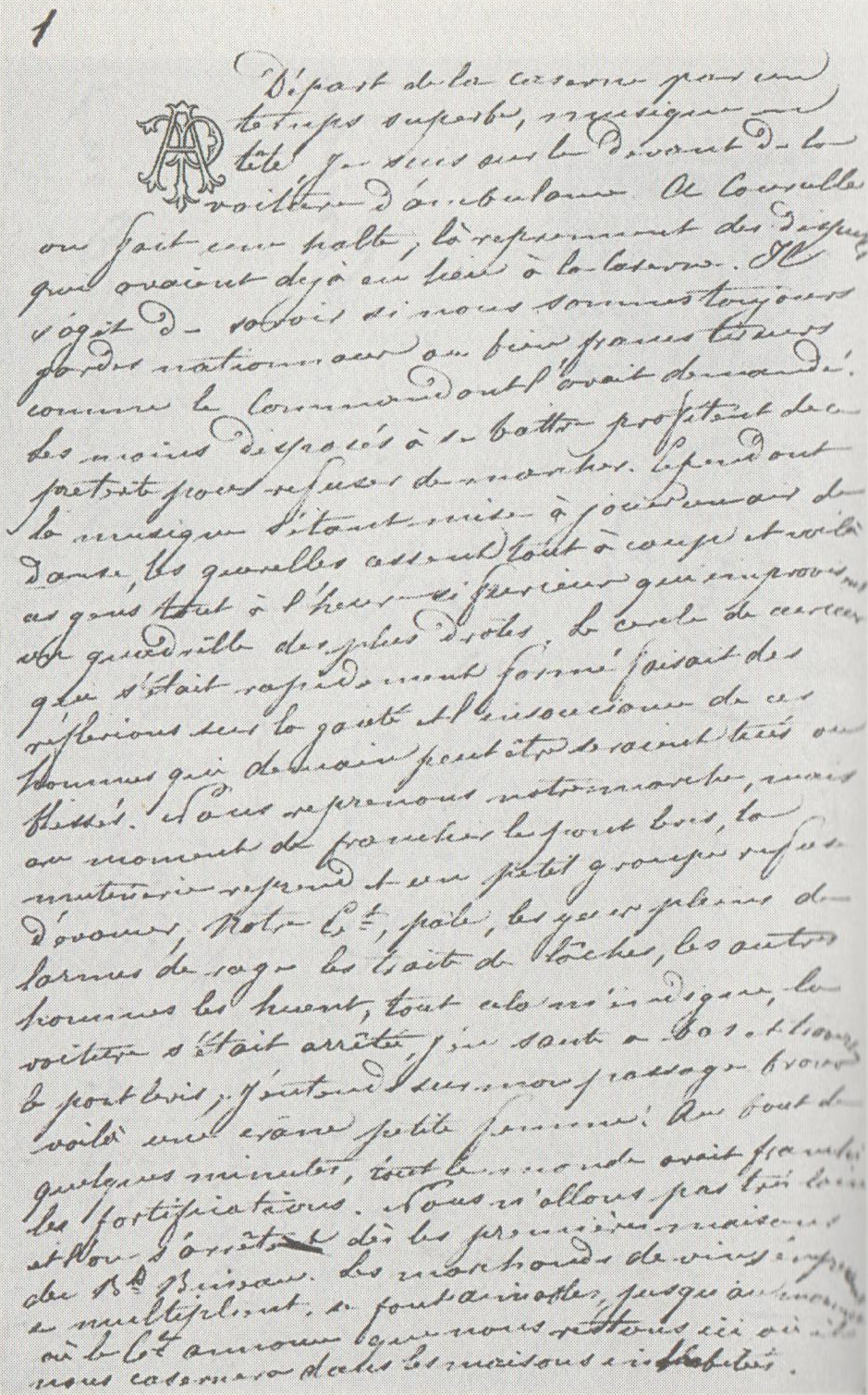
Letter from Alix Payen to her mother, undated.

In spite of everything, Alix Payen testifies to the good comradeship within the 153rd Battalion and to the attention she receives from the soldiers. She, who had a bourgeois upbringing, was astonished by the qualities of the men who were not bourgeois. In her various letters, she repeatedly describes her new comrades, introducing Paul Parelon, a "highly educated" poet, a former teacher at the Collège de Vanves, whose "verses inspired by his new situation" he often improvises; the men of the battalion, however, describe him as "a bit of a nutcase", and she herself finds him "very strange". Suffering from a heartbreak, he drinks heavily and Henri is asked to look after him. Chanoine, a worker in Henri Payen's factory from Clichy, is compared to the figure of the "Parisian from the suburbs, cheerful, mocking, a bit of a rogue". A "bad boy, so brusque, so rude", he nevertheless "took her in friendship". Alix Payen also writes about Émile Lalande, the commander of the battalion, who "is said to be very energetic and very brave; his physiognomy seems to indicate this", or, on several occasions, about Mme Mallet, a "fancy canteen girl" and a half-caste. Her husband Henry was killed on 27 April in the annex of the Oiseaux convent, so, having returned to Paris on the day of the tragedy, Alix Payen welcomed Mrs. Mallet into her home.

=== Contents of letters from his mother and sister ===
Alix Payen's mother and sister, both named Louise, share in their letters their visions of events and their political opinions, which are in contrast to each other. Louise Milliet, her little sister aged seventeen, developed radical and spontaneous ideas, expressed her sympathies towards the Commune and her antipathy towards the Church, whereas her mother was more critical and moderate. Less enthusiastic than her children, she nevertheless saw in the Commune a "new era" for Paris and supported their commitment.

"We break rather than bend. [We want the Republic, the royalists of Versailles want to take it away from us, to make us adore their fetish, a king, we prefer death; we are no longer fooled by their hypocritical words, and we will no longer allow ourselves to be deceived, as we were by the men of 4 September".

— Louise Milliet daughter, letter to her father on April 24, 1871.

"The government] should understand that there is something at the bottom, an idea worth discussing, but no, they are blind like everything that is old and everything that is destined to fall. I believe that this is the laborious birth of a new era and not the agony of France. So I look and I listen, the great malaise is that men are lacking, on the one hand there are only the old gossipers of 1830 and on the other, green fruit that is not ripe at all".

— Louise Milliet mother, letter to her husband on May 4, 1871.

Their letters, like those of Alix Payen before her departure for combat, also bear witness to life in a Paris that was twice besieged. They describe their daily life, between the rationing they have been suffering since January, the bombings they are fleeing and the shootings they are witnessing. On May 24, for example, they were exposed during the explosion of a powder magazine in Luxembourg. However, they were subjected to propaganda, false rumours and misinformation; sometimes the letters were even contradictory within the family.

"I will not leave Paris until there is an agreement and hostilities are definitively over. The Commune has taken hostages, imprisoned the archbishop, the parish priest of the Madeleine and many others, and the convents are being pillaged. Once they have started down this road, where will they stop? [I propose to send the whole of the right wing of the Chamber, that is to say three quarters, and the whole Commune to a desert island, they are all the same".

— Louise Milliet mother, letter to her husband on April 7, 1871.

"I hear that the most frightening rumours are being spread in the provinces about Paris, which is nevertheless very quiet and has not yet looted or killed anything, whatever the Versaillais say".

— Alix Payen, letter to his father on April 10, 1871.

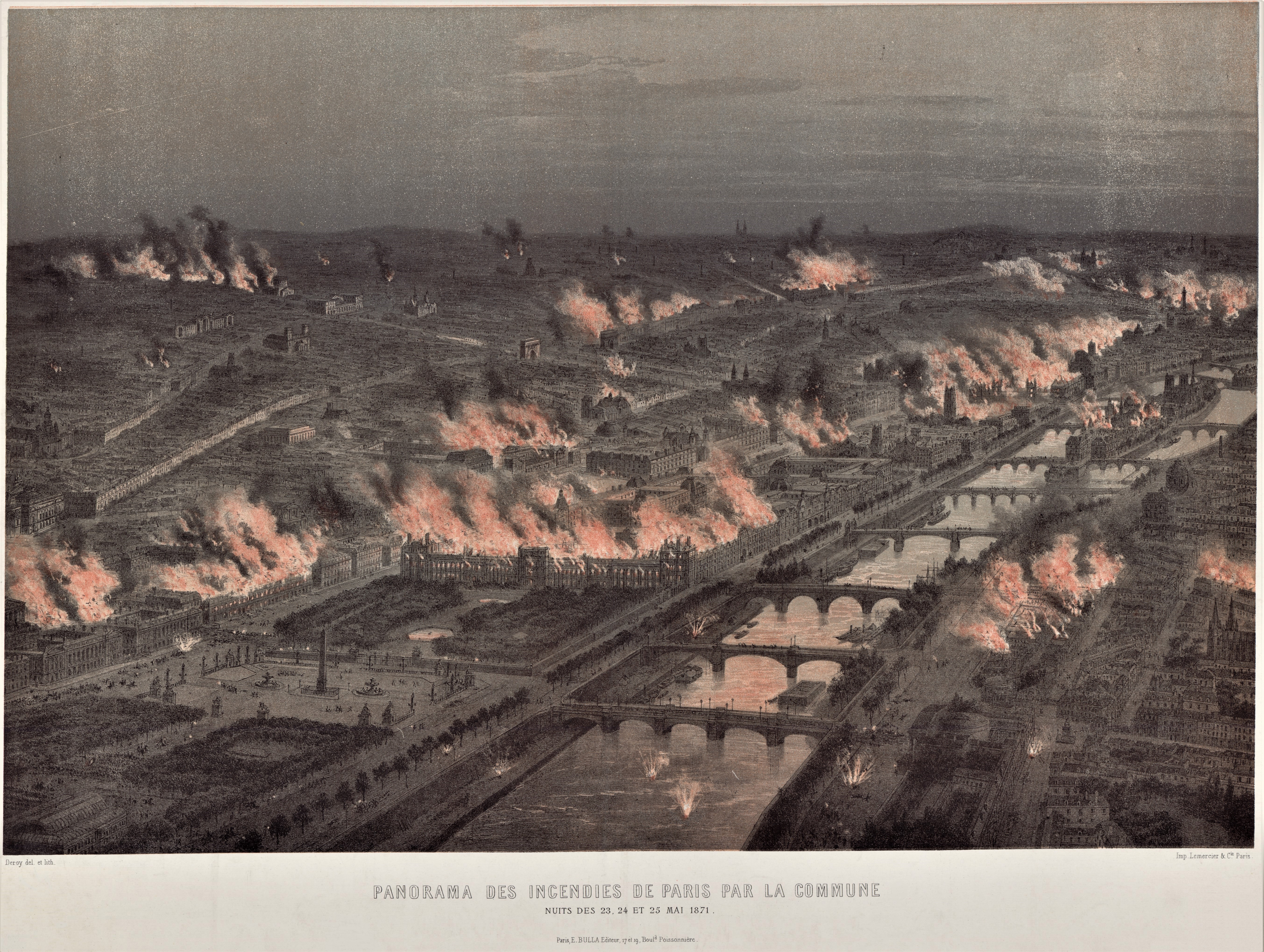
Panorama of the fires in Paris from 23 to 25 May 1871, lithograph by Auguste Victor Deroy. Preserved in the Carnavalet Museum in Paris.

Thus, the correspondence within the Milliet family is a source of description of several events of the Commune, or others that just precede it: the uprising of 22 January 1871 and its murderous shootings at the Hôtel de Ville, an important funeral procession for national guards killed during the first confrontations - and first defeats - on 9 April from the Palais de l'Industrie, a demonstration of 6,000 Freemasons for conciliation on April 29 - many of whom took up arms alongside the Fédérés or the fighting and fires during the Semaine sanglante, when Versailles troops took over Paris, which Mother Louise Milliet describes with observation.

"Paris was in flames on all sides, we were fighting on the Boulevard Montparnasse and the Observatory when suddenly fire broke out in the Luxembourg barracks and a moment later the powder magazine blew up! Our house shook like an earthquake, doors and windows shattered. With Paul and Louise we rush into the garden. Shrapnel and bullets rained down on us, we were there about forty people, it was impossible to escape, they were fighting on the boulevard, the attack and defence were furious at the Panthéon, the National Guards had received orders to blow up the Panthéon and even, it is said, the St. Etienne library".

— Louise Milliet mother, letter to her husband on May 25, 1871.

=== Roles of a woman and a bourgeoisie on the battlefield ===
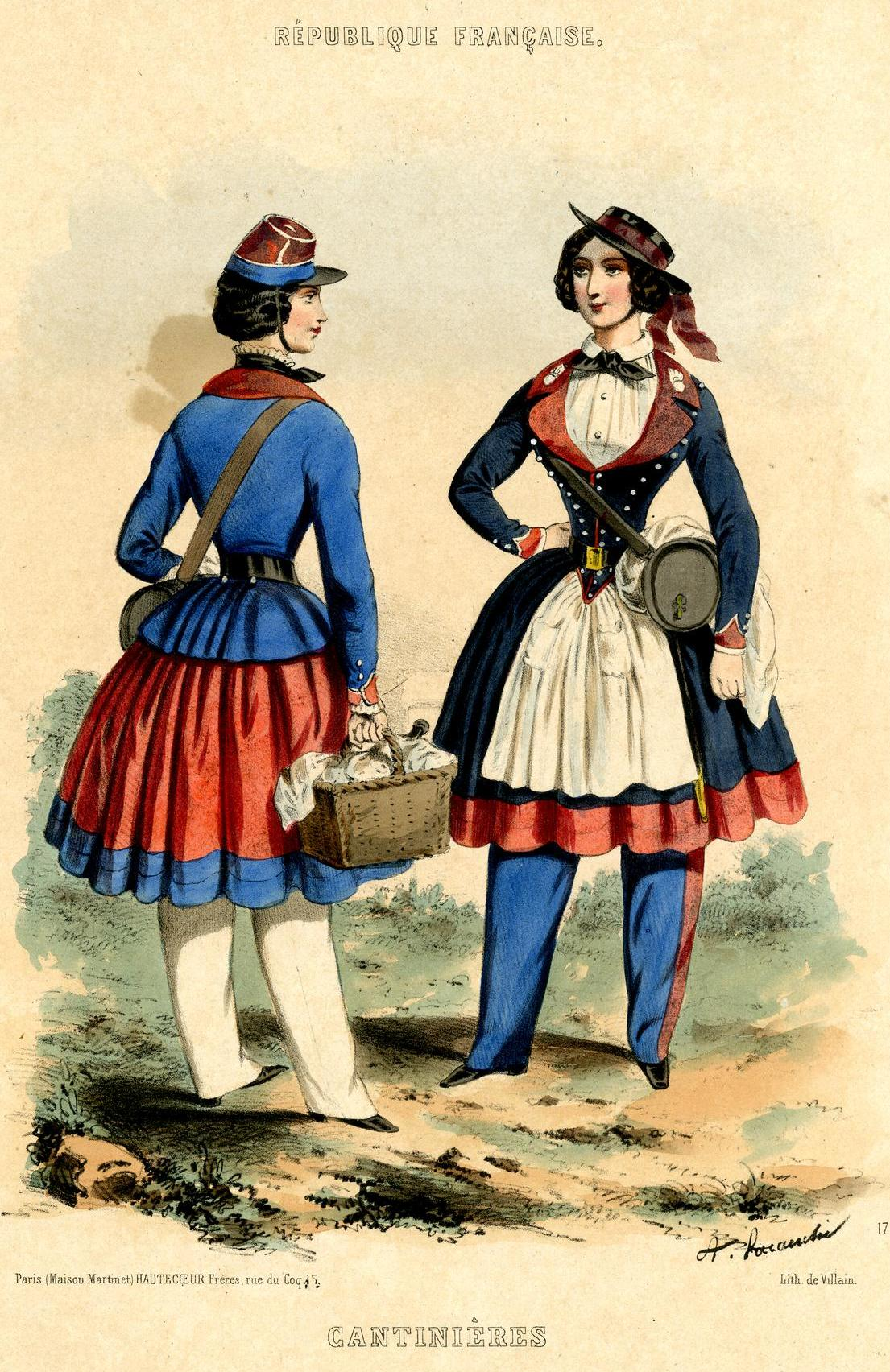
Canteen workers, lithograph by Alexandre Lacauchie and Villain, produced between 1848 and 1852. In the British Museum in London.

Among the women who joined the Paris Commune, the majority did so with a political aim, with the desire to build a new society and improve the condition of women. Others, fewer in number, enlisted to support their companion sent into battle, working as ambulance drivers or canteen workers. Alix Payen, the wife of a sergeant, was one of these. Her bourgeois origin also distinguishes her from most of the Communard women, who come from the bottom of the wage scale and live a life of misery, toil and struggle to feed their children. Dr. Carolyn J. Eichner, in an analysis in her 2004 book Surmounting the Barricades: Women in the Paris Commune, sees her as an illustration of how a woman's social position affects her life on the battlefield.

Carolyn J. Eichner uses Alix Payen's early letters from the trenches at Fort Issy as an example. While she describes how the soldiers live with a severe lack of provisions, she receives privileged treatment due to her social class. For example, she says on 21 April: "Water for cooking is quite far away, and they bring just the right number of cans, but I always find a bowl of water in the morning for my toilet. Even today, as it was cold, Canon had made me warm my water!" Alix Payen's companions thus provide her with privileges based on her presumed demands as a bourgeois woman, even though their temporary abandonment does not seem to bother her. Her social difference with the soldiers of the 153rd Battalion is also illustrated by the comments she makes about them in her letters, when she is surprised by their good behaviour and their attitude towards her.

According to Eichner, Alix Payen did not break with male domination either. She committed herself more out of love for Henri Payen than out of militancy, (Note: Carolyn J. Eichner quotes from the family autobiography of Paul Milliet (painter): How did a frail young woman, accustomed to the attentive care of her family, find herself animated by an unforeseen energy, to face such dangers?? It is that the defence of a just cause gives the enthusiasm which lifts hearts; it is also and above all that a reciprocal love transfigures beings: from the most timid it can make heroes and a letter from Alix Payen of 17 April 1871: dream of being an ambulance driver in Henri's battalion and of following him everywhere.) complying with the duty of a wife imposed on her, even if it meant sacrificing her well-being and putting her life in danger. Carolyn J. Eichner concludes that although Alix Payen encroaches on the masculine space of the battlefield, this encroachment is moderate, due both to the bourgeois privileges she preserves and to the male dominance embodied by her husband, whose service she remains.

== Appendices ==
=== Related articles ===
- Women in the Paris Commune
- Vivandières, women following their husbands in the army
- Victorine Brocher, anarchist, ambulance driver who gave her testimony in an autobiographical book in 1909
- Marie Chiffon, Republican, ambulance driver
- Béatrix Excoffon, Republican, ambulance driver
- Anna Jaclard, Russian socialist and feminist, ambulance driver
- Sophie Poirier, republican, ambulance driver

=== Bibliography ===
==== About Alix Payen and the Milliet family ====
- Milliet, Paul (1910). "Les Milliet, une famille de républicains fouriéristes". Cahiers de la Quinzaine (in French). Milliet 1911.
- Milliet, Paul (1915–1916). Une famille de républicains fouriéristes, les Milliet (in French). Paris: M. Giard and E. Brière. Milliet 1916.
- Saffrey, Alfred (March 15, 1971). "Paul Milliet : Une famille de républicains fouriéristes". Feuillets mensuels / l'Amitié Charles Péguy (in French). 166.
- Constant, Louis (1979). "Une ambulancière de la Commune de Paris". Mémoires de femmes mémoire du peuple (in French). Éditions Maspero. pp. 59 to 88. ISBN 978-2-7071-1022-0.
- Audin, Michèle (2020). C'est la nuit surtout que le combat devient furieux (in French). Libertalia. p. 128. ISBN 978-2-37729-134-2.
- anthologie établie par Jordi Brahamcha-Marin et Alice de Charentenay (2021). La Commune des écrivains : Paris, 1871 : vivre et écrire l'insurrection (in French). Éditions Gallimard. ISBN 978-2-0728-7234-1.

==== General works ====
- Thomas, Édith (2019). Les "Pétroleuses" (in French) (2nd ed.). L'Amourier Editions. p. 295. ISBN 9782364180550. Thomas 1963.
- Gullickson, Gay L. (1996). Unruly Women of Paris: Images of the Commune. Cornell University Press. p. 304. ISBN 978-1-5017-2529-6.
- Eichner, Carolyn J. (2004). Surmounting the Barricades: Women in the Paris Commune. Indiana University Press. p. 279. ISBN 978-0-2533-4442-7.
- Rey, Claudine; Annie Gayat; Sylvie Pepino (2013). Petit dictionnaire des femmes de la Commune : Les oubliées de l'histoire (in French). Limoges/Paris: Le bruit des autres. p. 301. ISBN 978-2-35652-085-2.

==== Other Communard testimonies ====
- Hardouin, Céleste (1879). La Détenue de Versailles en 1871 (in French). Paris. p. 144.
- Vuillaume, Maxime (2011). Mes cahiers rouges : Souvenirs de la Commune (in French). Paris: La Découverte. p. 720. ISBN 978-2-7071-6486-5.
- Brocher, Victorine (1909). Souvenirs d'une morte vivante (in French). Lausanne: A. Lapie. p. 313. Brocher 1909.
- Audin, Michèle (2019). Eugène Varlin, ouvrier relieur, 1839-1871 (in French). Montreuil: Libertalia. p. 488. ISBN 978-2-37729-086-4.

=== External links ===
- Michèle Audin, Série d'articles sur Alix Payen on macommunedeparis.com, 2018-2019
- Notices d'autorité : VIAF • Sudoc • GND • Italy • WorldCat
