= Gaston Ernest Liébert =

French diplomat

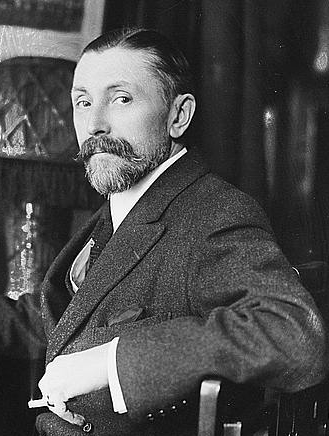
Gaston Ernest Liébert (c.1915)

Gaston Ernest Liébert (31 October 1866 – 6 July 1944) was a French diplomat.

== Biography ==
He was born in Paris, France in 1866, to the photographer, Alphonse Liébert.

He entered the École Navale in 1884 and spent seven years in the French Navy. In 1893, he joined the diplomatic corps and in 1898 was assigned to Asia. He was appointed French Vice-Consul in Beihai and in Tunghing from 1899 to 1901. He was an envoy to the French Legation in Peking following the Boxer Rebellion from 1901 to 1902. He became French Consul to Hong Kong from 1903 to 1916. During his time as the French consul in Hong Kong he worked closely together with French Indochina's political affairs bureau to gather intelligence on the whereabouts of German agents and Vietnamese revolutionaries, arguing that both had a common interest to see France lose the war. He was the French Consul-General in New York City in 1916.

He died in 1944.

== Legacy ==
His papers are archived at Cornell University.
