= Céleste Hardouin =

French teacher and activist (1832–1904)

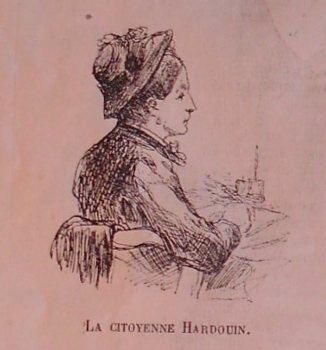
- Céleste Hardouin at the workers' congress in Paris, portrait by Auguste Lançon, L'Illustration, 1876.
- Born: Céleste Toulmé; 12 July 1832; Bréhémont
- Died: 9 January 1904 (aged 71); Paris
- Citizenship: French
- Occupation: Teacher
- Notable work: La Détenue de Versailles en 1871
- Movement: Socialism, Feminism

Céleste Hardouin (1832–1904) was a school teacher who advocated for lay education for women.

Denounced for having participated in the Paris Commune in 1871, she was arrested and imprisoned. She wrote an account about her captivity. After her release, she resumed teaching, founded a school and campaigned for feminism and secularism.

She was the founder of the French League for the Improvement of Women's Work, and took part in several workers' congresses, where she affirmed in particular the need for compulsory education to solve the question of women's work. She also proposed a plan for women's education to promote gender equality.

== Biography ==
Hardouin was born Céleste Toulmé on 12 July 1832 in Bréhémont. On 4 February 1850 she married Pierre Hardouin, who worked as a cooper and then a saddler.

She moved to Paris, where she became a teacher in the 18th arrondissement.

At the end of the Franco-Prussian War, during the Siege of Paris in 1870–1871, she volunteered as a nurse.

=== Paris Commune ===
The Paris Commune was a rebellion against the French Third Republic that began on 18 March 1871 and ended on 28 May. Hardouin approved of the commune, but appears to have been more of a spectator of events than an active contributor. However, she shared some demands and assisted at two meetings of the Club de la Révolution sociale.

She was nevertheless denounced as a communard and was arrested in her classroom on 7 July. She was falsely accused of having run two political clubs and a barricade.

=== Imprisonment ===
Hardouin was incarcerated at Versailles, first in the Orangerie, then in the Chantiers prison for women and children. She took the initiative to teach children there, until they were separated. She was then transferred to the prison on the rue de Paris, where she met Louise Michel.

She recounted her captivity and judicial investigation in an uncompromising autobiographical account, which she first published in the daily Le Rappel from 14 to 30 August 1876; she then published it at her own expense in 1879.

To obtain her release, she wrote a petition, of which Louise Michel was harshly critical. The fourth court martial heard her case on 8 October 1871 and acquitted her on 17 October. She then went back to school teaching.

=== Activism ===
During the preparation for the workers' congress of 1876, she took part in the initiative committee of the congress. She was known for being one of the more audacious of the feminist teachers who wanted to rethink education. During a preparatory meeting on 12 August, she notably intervened to affirm that only compulsory education could solve the problem of women's work. On the subject of instruction, she also demanded the creation of lay vocational education. She also demanded that taxes not be paid by the proletariat, but by capital.

At the congress that took place in Paris from 2–10 October, she was the delegate for the Ligue française pour l'amélioration du travail des femmes ("French league for the improvement of women's work"), of which she was the founder. Léon Richer, who was more moderate than her and whom she had broken off with, objected to this name, which he considered to be too close to the "Société pour l'amélioration du sort des Femmes" ("Society for the improvement of the lot of women") that he had created and which had to be dissolved. Hardouin at first retained this name, then changed it to "Union et protection mutuelle des femmes, pour l'amélioration du sort des ouvrières" ("Union and mutual protection of women, for the improvement of the lot of women workers").

On 6 October she presented to the Congress a vast project organizing education for girls, with the objective of gender equality. The principles of secularism and feminism animated her propositions. Le Petit Parisien published the manifesto "l'Union et protection mutuelle des femmes" ("The Union and Mutual Protection of Women") that addressed the workers of Paris: "Workers, let's come together. No more complaints that only rarely find a sympathetic echo. Let us unite our forces and our capabilities. Beyond castes and distinctions between manual and intellectual work [...]" The Catholic journal Le Mouvement social described her as a "socialist missionary" but echoed the speech she had given at Lyon and the objectives that she had fixed in l'Union et protection mutuelle des femmes.

Hardouin then participated in the workers' congress of Lyon in January–February 1878. She was the only woman there among the eight members of the executive committee. For the election to the chair of the board of one of the meetings, her name was acclaimed, but after discussion she was excluded from the position, because the law did not allow women as chairmen. On 2 February, she gave a long speech on instruction, professional training, and apprenticeship, which was interspersed with and followed by copious applause. She then took part in the workers' congress at Le Havre in 1880, where she represented "free and secular women teachers".

Her feminism, however, remained moderate. According to Le Féminisme et ses enjeux, the Ligue française pour l'amélioration du travail des femmes that she had created was not fully feminist, and according to Le Maitron, she believed that a woman's place was above all in the home.

She circulated a petition for the release of Louise Michel, but Michel disavowed it, because she did not want to be freed when other communards remained imprisoned. Hardouin went to the station to meet Michel in November 1880 after she was released, but according to police reports she argued with her the following month.

=== Teaching ===
Hardouin was also renowned for her teaching. Described as "active and hard-working", she founded and directed the Villa Poissonnière school in Goutte d'Or, which was also a boarding school.

=== Death ===
She died in the 18th arrondissement of Paris on 9 January 1904.

== Works ==
- La Détenue de Versailles en 1871, Paris, 1879. – Several editions, recently Len Pod, 2017 ISBN 2338780655, 978-2338780656.

== Bibliography ==
- Cordillot, Michel, ed. (2021). "Hardouin, Céleste (née Céleste Toulmé)". La Commune de Paris 1871. L'événement, les acteurs, les lieux (in French). Ivry-sur-Seine: Les Éditions de l'Atelier. pp. 637–639.
- Bidelman, Patrick Kay (1975). The Feminist Movement in France: The Formative Years, 1858-1889. Michigan State University. pp. 170, 251, 252..
