= Alphonse Liébert =

French photographer

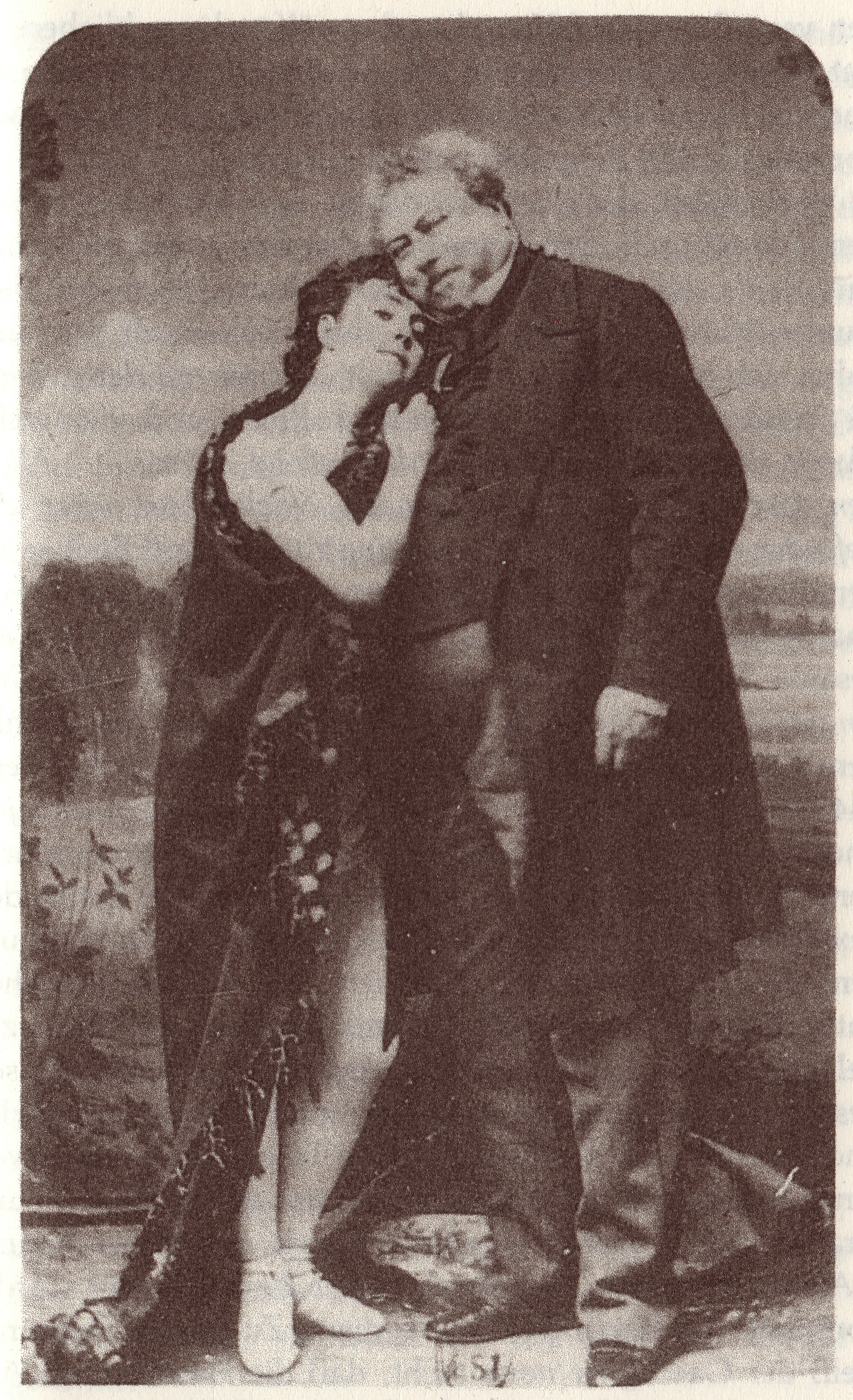
Alexandre Dumas and his mistress, Adah Menken

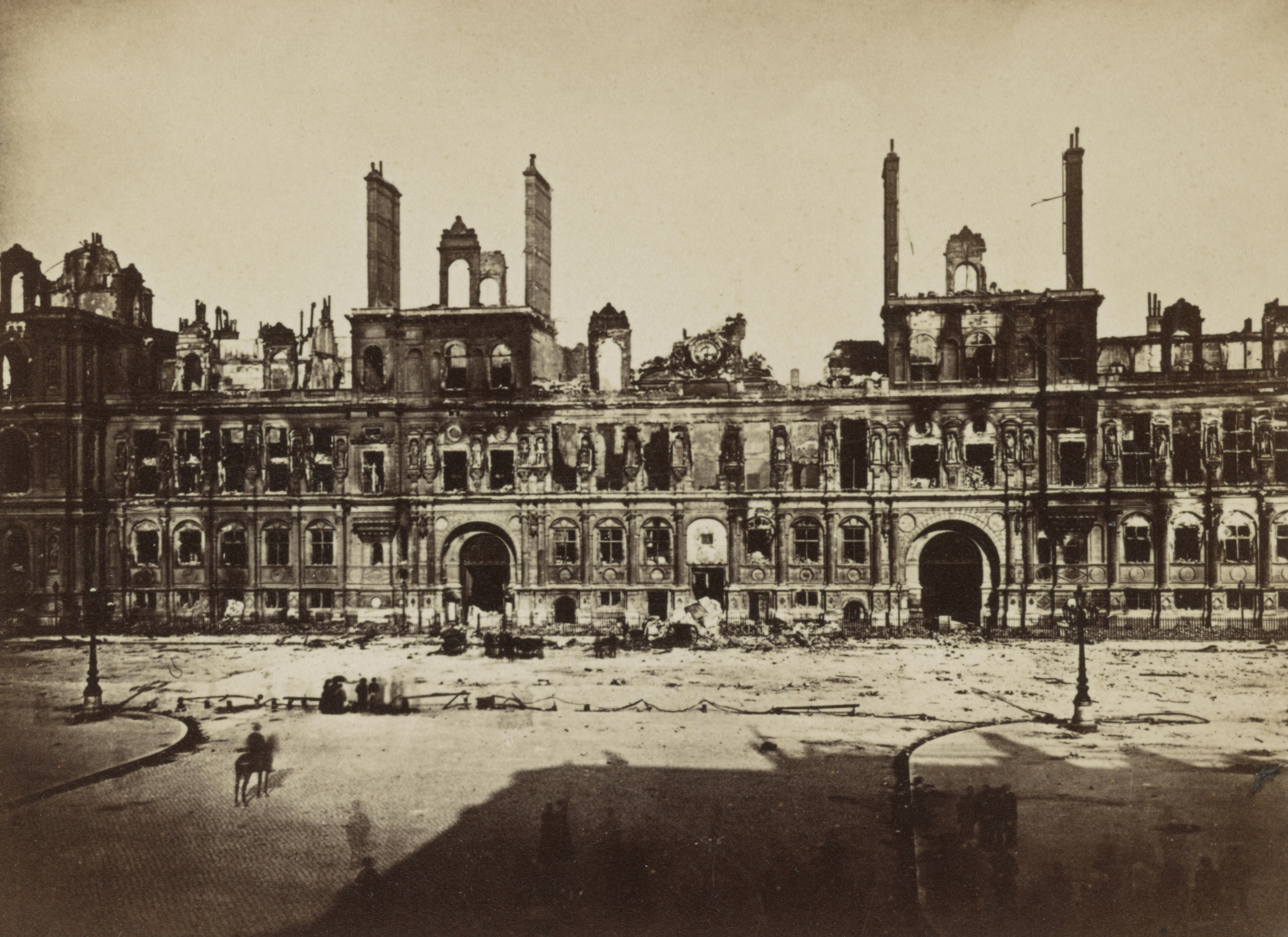
The Hôtel de Ville (City Hall), set on fire during the Commune

Alphonse Justin Liébert (30 November 1826, Tournai - 18 June 1913, Paris) was a French photographer.

== Biography ==
Initially devoted to a career in the Navy, he was wounded at the Battle of Vuelta de Obligado (1845), in Argentina. He had always been interested in photography, so he took it as an opportunity to embark on a new career. Around 1853, probably attracted by the Gold Rush, he had established himself as a photographer in California.

He returned to France in 1863 and set up a studio in Paris. Between then and 1906, he would relocate his studio at least four times. In 1866, he married Marie-Louise Peuple, a trader in silks. They had three children; Marie-Louise, apparently born out of wedlock, Gaston Ernest, a career diplomat, and Georges Auguste (1876-1947), who also became a photographer.

In 1867, he photographed Alexandre Dumas with his mistress, Adah Isaacs Menken. Later that year, following a small scandal, Dumas sued him,, demanding that the pictures be withdrawn from sale. His suit was originally dismissed, but accepted on appeal. The photographs were bought back and their future sale prohibited.

He was one of the few photographers to remain in Paris during the Commune; documenting the buildings destroyed during the Bloody Week, and the barricades built by the Communards. In addition, he was the only one to photograph the ruins in the inner suburbs, caused by Prussian bombardments. In 1872, he published these pictures in a double album called Les ruines de Paris et de ses environs. 1870 - 1871. Cent photographies.

In 1873, he became a member of the Société française de photographie. In 1897, together with his son, Georges, he founded "A. Liébert et Cie", devoted to the manufacture and distribution of silver celluloid photographic paper. Their company declared bankruptcy in 1906. He died in 1913, and was interred at the Cimetière du Père-Lachaise.

== Writings ==
- Alphonse Liébert, La photographie en Amérique, Paris, Leiber, 1864 (Online @ Internet Archive)
