= Aeschbacher =

Aeschbacher is a surname. Notable people with the surname include:

- Adrian Aeschbacher (1912–2002), Swiss pianist; son of Carl, brother of Niklaus
- Carl Aeschbacher (1886–1944), Swiss composer; father of Adrian and Niklaus
- Hans Aeschbacher (1906–1980), Swiss sculptor
- Marianne Aeschbacher (b. 1970), French former synchronized swimmer
- Marita Aeschbacher (born 1941), Swiss equestrian
- Niklaus Aeschbacher (1917–1995), Swiss conductor; son of Carl, brother of Adrian
- Walther Aeschbacher (1901–1969), Swiss conductor and composer

== See also ==
- Michael Aschbacher (born 1944), American mathematician with a similar name
