= Herbert Breiter =

- Born: 21 February 1927; Landeshut (Lower Silesia), Germany
- Died: 9 October 1999; Salzburg, Austria
- Occupations: Painter; Lithographer
- Spouse: Notburga "Burgi" Lobisser
- Parent(s): Richard Breiter; Anna Buchberger

Herbert Breiter (21 February 1927 - 9 October 1999) was a German-born Austrian painter and lithographer. He is known, in particular, for his landscape paintings, his "atmospheric scenes" ("Stimmungsbilder") and for the many views of Salzburg, his adopted home city, that he produced. His surviving output also includes still lifes and portraits.

== Life and works ==
=== Provenance and early years ===
Herbert Breiter was born at Landeshut (as it was known at that time), a country town in the Riesengebruge / Krkonoše foothills south-west of Breslau / Wrocław (Lower Silesia). He was the younger of the two sons of Richard und Anna Breiter. The boys' father, a skilled engineer originally from nearby Schreibendorf, was employed at the Rinkel textiles business in the town. Their upbringing, in the family home beside the Trautenauer Straße in Landeshut, is described as "sheltered". (Note: "...eine behütete Kindheit".) As a boy, Herbert Breiter came under affectionate pressure from Heinrich Breiter, a railway employee and enthusiast, to make his career on the railways: "You can paint in Sundays", his grandfather would reassure him, fully aware how much the child loved to paint. Breiter attended junior school in Landeshut, where his exceptional talent for drawing was spotted. Later he was sent away to a specialist boarding school in Ballenstedt, in order that his talent might be further developed.

In 1944, having passed the necessary entrance exam, he was offered and accepted a student place at the Dresden Academy of Fine Arts. Before he could take it up, however, he was conscripted for military service, and sent to join a mountain regiment based in Garmisch-Partenkirchen. After the war ended in May 1945 there could be no question of returning home to Silesia, due to the ethnic cleansing of 1944/45. Landeshut, hitherto ethnically mixed, became known by its Polish name, as Kamienna Góra, and was repopulated by Polish expellees from former eastern Poland annexed by the Soviet Union and settlers from central Poland. Breiter relocated to Salzburg, which would be his home for the rest of his life. Legally he was stateless. In 1946 he took the entrance exam for admission to the Fine Arts Academy in Salzburg. This was a precondition for his residence permit and subsequent application for citizenship. It is unclear from the sources whether he was ever offered a student place: he certainly never enrolled at the Salzburg academy.

=== Career ===
He embarked, instead, on a career as a freelance painter and sculptor. As an artist he is sometimes described as having been, at this stage, largely self-taught, though from other sources it is clear that his parents paid considerable attention to nurturing and encouraging his artistic abilities while he was still a schoolboy. During the early postwar period he supplemented his income in the winter seasons by working as a ski-instructor. In 1947 Herbert Breiter received his much-prized Austrian citizenship. There are references to his having become a pupil of the polymath-artist Max Peiffer Watenphul at around this time, probably during 1946/47: although Watenphul's own application for an Austrian residence failed, he was able to remain in Salzburg for long enough to be regarded as an important influence over a number of Salzburg artists who later came to prominence in their own right. Along with Breiter, another of his students was Agnes Muthspiel. The two of them teamed up in 1946, sharing a studio-apartment and their lives together till 1958. The couple's home in Salzburg-Mönchsberg became a regular meeting point for painters, musicians and theatre folk such as Caspar Neher, Gottfried von Einem, Oscar Fritz Schuh and Carl Orff. It was through Neher and von Einem that, in 1948, Breiter was accepted into what sources identify as the "International Art Club". It is from this point that he began to exhibit and to travel. He worked in oils and in watercolors, also producing a succession of Lithography cycles. He became a founder member of the Salzburg Group "of top artists" in 1951, and was subsequently accepted for membership of the Salzburger Kunstverein exhibitions organisation.

=== Burgi ===
Herbert Breiter married Notburga "Burgi" Lobisser from Klagenfurt in 1966. She has a background in the arts world. Leo "Switbert" Lobisser (1878-1943), her father, had been a Benedictine monk at Lavanttal (in the mountains between Klagenfurt and Graz) since entering the monastery there as a novice in 1899. In 1932 he resigned from the monastery and settled in Klagenfurt, after falling in love with Eva "Ev" Luise Bleymaier, Burgi's mother. Burgi was born later that summer. Her mother died tragically less than half a year later. Her father built a successful freelance career, and became well known in Carinthia as a (not uncontroversial) woodwork artist and painter.

=== Travels with an easel ===
Herbert Breiter was an internationalist. In 1948 he took a lengthy trip to Italy. He stayed on the Island of Ponza, and would return to the island many times, especially during the early 1950s: he would return again, with his recently acquired wife, in 1968. Several sources mention admiringly Breiter's sheer love of painting, and in the context of Italy he loved to paint the landscapes, with a particular focus on the olive groves, the sea shores and the vineyards. It is clear from his output that Breiter was still making regular trips to Italy during the later 1970s and beyond, and still painting the landscapes there, but his later Italian work is, for the most part, produced not on the islands but in Tuscany. Beyond Italy, there were a number of productive "study trips" to the Mani Peninsula during the 1980s and 1990s. Places where Breiter painted also included Dalmatia, Ischia, Scandinavia and Spain. Later the vineyards of southern Styria were frequently incorporated into his artistic itineraries.

=== Final years ===
Herbert Breiter's final years were overshadowed by seriously illness.

His physical remains were buried at the Salzburg "Kommunalfriedhof" (cemetery) in Salzburg-Gneis.

== Teaching ==
Herbert Breiter is not remembered primarily as a teacher. He did nevertheless have a celebrity pupil. He taught Eliette von Karajan, who lived (sometimes) in Salzburg in connection with her husband's professional calendar. Breiter was a welcome and frequent guest at the Karajans' little estate at Anif, on the southern outskirts of Salzburg. "I learnt so much about brushwork and colouring from him. He also introduced me to the technicalities of etching and watercolours and showed me how to prepare canvases", she would later recall. Eliette von Karajan had grown up in southern France: her own artistic output indicates that she shared Breiter's love of Mediterranean landscapes.

== Celebration and recognition (selection) ==
- 1958 Austrian Graphics Prize
- 1958 Theodor Körner Foundation scholarship
- 1992 Slavi Soucek Prize

In 2012 the old Peterswacht-Bastion, which is a survivor from the city walls that long ago surrounded Salzburg's "old-town" quarter, was renamed as the "Herbert Breiter Terrace" and a memorial tablet commemorating Breiter was placed there.
