= Anton Nowakowski =

German organist, conductor and composer

Anton Nowakowski (10 February 1897 – 3 January 1969) was a German organist, conductor and composer.

== Biography ==
Born in Langenau near Danzig, Nowakowski was a pupil of Alexander von Zemlinsky and Fidelio F. Finke in Prague (composition), Max Springer in Vienna (counterpoint) as well as in organ by Karl Straube in Leipzig and Fritz Heitmann in Berlin. From 1921 to 1927, he worked as an organist at the Emmaus Monastery (Prague) and as a conductor of the German University in Prague. From 1927 to 1934 he worked at the Folkwang University of the Arts in Essen. Since 1936 he was Kapellmeister in Berlin and Danzig, then from 1941 to 1945 professor at the German University of Music in Prague. From 1948 Nowakowski was a professor of organ playing and director of the Department of Catholic Church Music at the University of Music in Stuttgart and guested as a conductor with famous orchestras throughout Europe. He was a sought-after organ interpreter of the works of Johann Sebastian Bach, Max Reger and Johann Nepomuk David.

Nowakowski died in Stuttgart on 3 January 1969 at the age of 71.

== Sources ==
- Großes Lexikon der Musik, Honegger/Massenkeil, Herder Freiburg 1978
