= Muthspiel =

Muthspiel is a surname. Notable people with the surname include:

- Agnes Muthspiel (1914-1966), Austrian painter
- Christian Muthspiel (born 1962), Austrian composer, trombonist, and pianist
- Wolfgang Muthspiel (born 1965), Austrian jazz guitarist and record label owner
