= Eliette von Karajan =

Widow of Herbert von Karajan, patron of the arts (born 1939)

- Born: Eliette Mouret; 13 August 1932 (age 94); Mollans-sur-Ouvèze, Drôme, France
- Occupations: Fashion model Arts patron
- Spouse: Herbert von Karajan (m. 1958; died 1989)
- Children: Isabel (born 1960); Arabella (born 1964)

Eliette von Karajan (née Mouret; born 13 August 1932) (Note: Eliette von Karajan: Mein Leben an seiner Seite. Ullstein Verlag, Berlin 2008, p. 15 and p. 9. When she met Herbert von Karajan in 1957, she was, according to her autobiography, 18 years old, which would make the year of birth 1939. The other sources referenced here indicate that she met Karajan some years earlier than 1957, and had already met him and become "obsessed with him" in 1955 when they bumped into each other in London, which seems to have been the point at which the relationship became more serious. If she was 18 when she was discovered by Christian Dior in 1950, and became a photo-model "in the early 1950s", then a birth year around 1932 or 1933 becomes more plausible.) is a former French fashion model, first discovered by Christian Dior when she was 18. She is also known as the wife of conductor Herbert von Karajan. As a widow, she is a prominent patron of the arts and a promoter of her deceased husband's artistic legacy. She has established several artistic foundations and institutes. Von Karajan served as president of the Karajan Foundation Salzburg Easter Festival until 2020. Since then, she has served as honorary president.

== Life ==
=== Provence and early years ===
Eliette Mouret was born in Mollans-sur-Ouvèze, where her parents, both teachers, owned a holiday home. She had one sibling, a sister who was twenty years her senior. While Mouret was quite young, her father died. In a later interview she stated that her mother "was a teacher with a passion for playing the piano, but no time for me. I ended up with a 'foster mother'". (Note: "Meine Mutter war Lehrerin, die eine große Leidenschaft fürs Klavierspiel hatte, aber keine Zeit für mich. Ich kam zu einer Pflegemutter.") Mouret attended a boarding school run by nuns and grew up in Nice.

=== Karajan ===
Mouret was discovered by Christian Dior when she was eighteen years old. Then, she became known for her long legs, modeling Dior's haute couture creations in photography and fashion shows in many of Europe's competing fashion capitals. In the early 1950s, she first met Herbert von Karajan on a friend's yacht at Saint-Tropez. She was reportedly seventeen at the time, though according to one biographer, "like many very beautiful women ... [she] was seventeen for an awfully long time". On this occasion, the smell of frying fish triggered her recurrent seasickness, and she had to be escorted ashore; Herbert von Karajan volunteered for the task. In 1955, they met up again in London, by which time she had become obsessed with the maestro. During the early 1950s, she began to accompany him on visits to Ischia, where they would meet up with friends and fellow musicians including William Walton and his wife. Lady Walton's later recalled from those visits to the Bay of Naples, Karajan and Mouret sharing a Vespa, with Mouret sitting side-saddle on the back as they scootered back and forth across the island. Herbert, still married to Anita von Karajan at the time, divorced her in 1958; he and Eliette Mouret then married at Megève on 6 October 1958. This marked the end of her career as a fashion model and the beginning of her life as a "jet-set wife" and, a few years later, mother. She was the third of Karajan's three wives, and they would remain married for thirty-one years, until his death.

The couple's elder daughter, Isabel, was born on 25 June 1960 in Vienna. Isabel Karajan has subsequently achieved notability as an actress. The Karajans' younger daughter Arabella was born at Samaden on 2 January 1964. The designated godparents of Isabel and Arabella Karajan were, respectively, the Vienna Philharmonic and Berlin Philharmonic orchestras.

=== Working marriage ===
Life was not all roses ... Endless flights, trips to the hair-dressers, in high-heels all day, photographers everywhere ... Sometimes it was much too much ... then I protested too. Thank God I had the temperament. Sometimes too much. Then the coffee cups flew. Often I'd already packed my bags. And then he'd come and ask, 'What's with the suitcase?' Took me in his arms and everything was good again.

Das war nicht immer rosig ... Immer wieder Flugzeug, Friseur, Reisen auf hohen Absätzen, zig Fotografen überall ... Manchmal wurde es mir viel zu viel ... dann habe ich auch protestiert. ... Das Temperament hatte ich, Gott sei Dank. Eher zu viel manchmal. Da flogen dann schon auch mal die Kaffeetassen. Oft hatte ich schon meine Koffer gepackt. Und dann kam er und fragte: „Was willst du mit dem Koffer?“ Nahm mich in den Arm und alles war wieder gut.

— Eliette von Karajan in conversation with Dagmar von Taube, 2014

Over the next three decades Eliette von Karajan constantly accompanied her husband, matching his program of travel and performances and attempting to shield him, as far as possible, from some of the more oppressive aspects of celebrity. Karajan valued his wife's musical judgment because she was neither a trained musician nor a professional musicologist; as a "mere music lover" he knew that she was more representative of concertgoers and record buyers than pundits or professional rivals. She alone sat with him through waits behind the curtain, as he studied a score and arranged for her to have a foot massage, before he headed out towards the podium, and she rushed to take her place in the audience. A pattern was quickly established, and, as their marriage reached a third decade, some commentators suggested that there was an element of careful choreography in the way the Karajans presented a public face of their intense partnership. Between concerts, Karajan attended her husband's orchestral rehearsals.

The Karajans were part of a network of cerebral artist-celebrities, and their friends included Jean Cocteau, Elisabeth Schwarzkopf, Henri-Georges Clouzot, Helmut Schmidt, Marc Chagall, and the actress Romy Schneider, with whom Eliette supposedly liked to flirt. However, relations cooled after Schneider, while staying as a house guest, used lipstick to scrawl graffiti all over the large mirror in the bathroom. It was "very awkward for my staff", Eliette later recalled. (Note: ..."unangenehm vor meinen Angestellten".")

Much of the couple's married life was spent traveling in connection with Herbert von Karajan's work. From around 1961, when they did come home, it was to St. Moritz (in Winter), Saint-Tropez (in Summer) or Karajan's small estate at Anif, on the southern edge of Salzburg. In each of these municipalities they lived in some style, supported by staffs of domestic servants. Since she was widowed in 1989, Eliette von Karajan has reduced her travelling and for the most part simply alternated between living at the homes the couple had shared at Saint-Tropez and Anif.

=== Painting ===
Herbert von Karajan was particularly enthusiastic about Eliette's emergence as an artist:

In her entire artistic thought and expression she is someone whose starting point is the visual image. She brings a fantastic imagination to the way she sees things. It really was only a matter of time before she would be driven to [re]start her painting. She made a very tentative start, but then the breakthrough came. For me it is [also] a massive piece of good fortune, because now she must for herself find out how the ups and downs of artistic creativity operate. You cannot expect to succeed every time!

In ihrem ganzen künstlerischen Denken und Fühlen ist sie ein Mensch, der zuerst vom Bild her kommt. Sie hat eine ungeheure Phantasie in ihrer Art, die Dinge zu sehen, und es war eigentlich nur eine Frage der Zeit, wann sie mit der Malerei beginnen mußte. Zuerst hat sie ganz schüchtern angefangen, dann ist es zum Durchbruch gekommen. Für mich ist das ein riesiges Glück, denn sie mußte natürlich auch einmal erfahren, wie es um das Hoch und Tief künstlerischen Schaffens bestellt ist. Man kann nicht erwarten, daß alles gelingt!

— Herbert von Karajan,
quoted by Ernst Haeussermann (1978) and Harriet von Behr (2020)

While still working as a professional fashion model, Eliette Mouret enrolled briefly at an art academy in London. Professional pressures, followed by a full-time marriage accompanied by motherhood, led to her never finishing the course. However, after a visit to the "Visuals Academy" (Internationale Sommer Akademie für Bildenden Künste) set up in Switzerland by Oskar Kokoschka, she returned to her art. She was supported by several famous of the time who were also friends. These included late surrealists such as Ernst Fuchs, Jörg Immendorff and Marc Chagall whom she visited frequently at his home in Saint-Paul-de-Vence. Her teacher, the painter Herbert Breiter, was also a very important artistic influence. Her husband was particularly enthusiastic about Eliette's emergence as an artist.

Till 1982, Eliette's art remained an entirely private passion. Then, a series of her paintings were featured on record sleeves (with more in a separate accompanying supplement) for a special anniversary collection of Karajan recordings issued to celebrate the centenary of the Berlin Philharmonic orchestras (of which Herbert von Karajan had been principal conductor since 1956). The entire set, which had originally comprised 50 LP discs, was re-issued on 5 April 1988 as a set of 25 CDs to mark Herbert's eightieth birthday.

=== Widow and benefactor ===
Herbert von Karajan suffered a heart attack on 15 July 1989 and died the next day. While he was alive the management of his media image had been of great importance to him, and following his death Eliette adeptly applied "secrecy and speed" to ensure that his funeral did not become a press spectacle. Only around ten people knew of the arrangements for the private funeral ceremony in the little cemetery at Anif. As matters turned out, a large stone plinth was found a few centimeters under the surface at the position agreed, many years before, as Herbert's last resting place, and the burial was delayed for several hours after while a farmer used a heavy tractor with lifting tackle to drag the stone away. It was dark by the time the body of Herbert von Karajan could be buried, but the entire ceremony nevertheless remained a private family matter.

Eliette von Karajan faced questions over the closure, in 2006, of the "Herbert von Karajan Center" in Vienna:

It did not develop in the way I had anticipated. It became ever more commercialised. They sold ash-trays and Karajan umbrellas. And I am really not rich enough to back that sort of thing. Besides, I hate umbrellas. I never take an umbrella; and in Salzburg [where von Karajan has her winter home], as I do not need to tell you, it rains a lot.

Es hat sich nicht so entwickelt, wie ich es mir vorgestellt habe. Es wurde immer mehr kommerzialisiert. Sie haben Aschenbecher verkauft und Karajan-Regenschirme. Und um das zu fördern, bin ich nicht reich genug. Übrigens, ich hasse Regenschirme überhaupt. Ich gehe immer ohne Schirm, und in Salzburg, das können Sie mir wirklich glauben, regnet es sehr oft.

— Eliette von Karajan, interviewed by Peter Vujica in 2008

It was at the widow's instigation that in 1995 the "Herbert von Karajan Center" was set up in Vienna, across the road from the "Staatsoper". It accommodated a comprehensive archive of Herbert von Karajan's many audio and video recordings. The centre closed in 2006. Eliette was disappointed by the commercialisation of the Karajan Center.

It was no coincidence that the closure of the Karajan Center opposite the Vienna State Opera followed shortly after the opening, in December 2005, of the Eliette and Herbert von Karajan Institute. Michael Dewitte, the director of the Salzburg Easter Festival, was appointed Geschäftsführer (CEO) of the institute, into which the Vienna-based Karajan Center's surviving activities were to be incorporated. It was explained that the institute, for which an annual budget of €1.5 million had been set aside, would co-ordinate concert planning in connection with the centenary of Herbert von Karajan's birth in 2008. It was located not, as might have been expected, in Vienna, but in Salzburg, emphasizing the Karajans' close artistic and personal connections with that city. In the longer term, the ambition was for the institute to celebrate and to make more widely known Herbert's achievements, along with the associated elements of his character, as interpreter, artist, promoter of talent and excellence, educator and entrepreneur-artist. Activities of the institute would involve organizing symposia and exhibitions. Continuing skillful media engagement was also central to the project. Geschäftsführer Dewitte stressed the importance attached to the Nachhaltigkeit [sustainability] of the project. In practical terms, this has been expressed through a particular emphasis on discovering and supporting younger musicians and other artists.

Eliette also supported a new generation of artists in their work. One manifestation of this was the "Eliette von Karajan-Kulturfonds" (Eliette von Karajan Culture Fund) launched in 2001, which made available annually, initially for a term of five years, at least 100,000 US dollars or 150,000 Swiss francs to support cultural initiatives and activities in the Canton of Graubünden, where the family had made a ski-season home together at St. Moritz since 1961. Characteristically, the allocation of grants was to be prioritized according to certain criteria such as "internationality", "reflection of contemporary culture", "involvement or benefit of/for young people" and "cultural or inspirational usefulness to the canton or individual regions within the canton". Early award winners included a young violinist/composer, a young clarinettist, a young author of film and theatre texts, and a youthful theatre director. The unifying theme was the exceptional level of talent and early achievement already demonstrated by each of the recipients. Former award recipients who have already built significant reputations include the recorder player and conductor Maurice Steger, the mezzo-soprano Maria Riccarda Wesseling and the theatre director Felix Benesch.

Another initiative was the "Prix Eliette von Karajan", reflecting her own commitment to painting. High-profile recipients include the English artist-entrepreneur Damien Hirst in 1995, the sculptor Rachel Whiteread in 1996, the German artist Helmut Dorner in 1997 and the Graubünden singer-lyricist Corin Curschellas in 2003.

== Notes and references ==
Notes
