= Max Springer =

Austrian composer and organist

Max Springer (December 1877 – 20 January 1954) was a German organist, composer and music educator.

== Life ==
Springer grew up in the municipality of Schwendi, Baden-Württemberg. He was initially a pupil of the Beuron Archabbey and came to Prague as organist at St. Emmaus Monastery, a branch of the Beuron Monastery, where he studied at the German University in Prague with, among others, Antonín Dvořák and Josef Klička. As early as 1910, he taught composition at the Wiener Musikakademie, and in 1923 he was appointed full professor and received the title of "Hofrat". In 1926, he became director of the University of Music and Performing Arts Vienna. The municipality of Schwendi made him an honorary citizen in 1933. Among his students were Johann Bauernfeind, Kurt Wöss, Erwin Weiss, Karl Josef Walter, Marko Tajčević, and Anton Nowakowski. Springer died in Vienna at the age of 76.

== Work ==
- Sechs Fughetten über den Namen BACH op. 14. Coppenrath-Verlag, Regensburg, 1908
- 8 Postludien über die gebräuchlichsten Ite missa est. op. 20
- 4 Präludien und eine Fantasie über das Oster-Halleluja op. 21
- Missa "Lauda Sion" op. 22
- Te deum, op. 28, für gemischten Chor und Orgelbegleitung, Bonifatius-Druckerei, Prag, 1914
- Messe zu Ehren der seligen Crescentia Höss op. 31
- Kleine Präludien für Orgel op. 35
- Konzert für Violine und Orgel op. 40
