= Herbert von Karajan =

Austrian conductor (1908–1989)

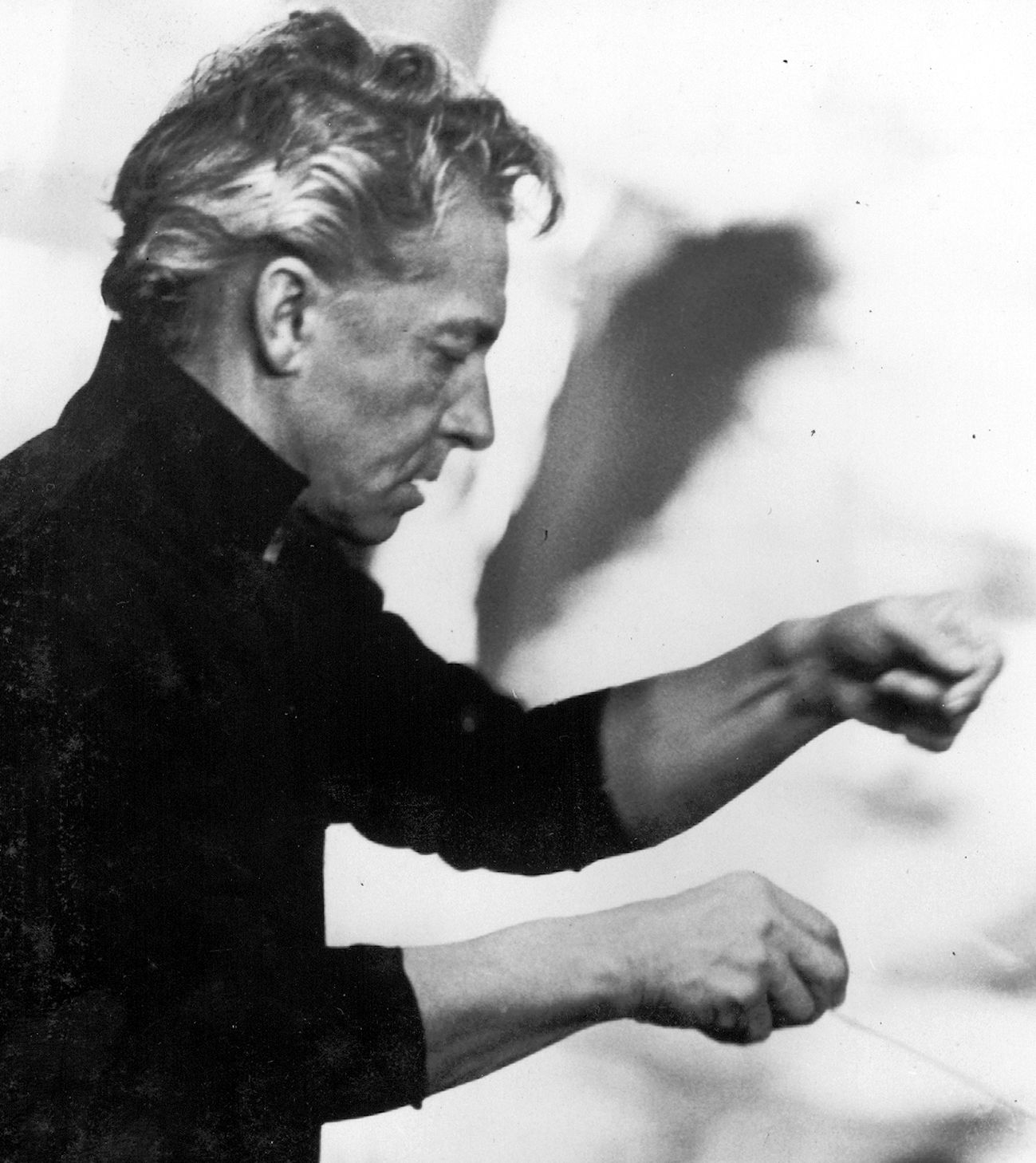
- Karajan conducting in 1972
- Born: Heribert Adolf Ernst Karajan; 5 April 1908; Salzburg, Austria-Hungary
- Died: 16 July 1989 (aged 81); Anif, Austria
- Occupation: Conductor
- Years active: 1929–1989
- Political party: Nazi Party (1933–1945)
- Spouses: Elmy Holgeroef (1938–1942); Anna Maria Sauest (1942–1958); Eliette Mouret (1958–1989)
- Children: 2, including Isabel

Herbert von Karajan (German: [ˈhɛʁbɛʁt fɔn ˈka(ː)ʁajan]; born Heribert Adolf Ernst Karajan; 5 April 1908 – 16 July 1989) was an Austrian conductor. He was principal conductor of the Berlin Philharmonic for 34 years. While a member of the Nazi party, he debuted at the Salzburg Festival, with the Vienna Philharmonic, the Berlin Philharmonic, and during World War II he conducted at the Berlin State Opera. Generally regarded as one of the greatest conductors of the 20th century, he was a controversial but dominant figure in European classical music from the mid-1950s until his death. Part of the reason for this was the large number of recordings he made and their prominence during his lifetime. By one estimate, he sold 200 million records.

== Biography ==
=== Early life ===
==== Genealogy ====
The Karajans were of Greek ancestry. Herbert's great-great-grandfather, Georg Karajan (Geórgios Karajánnis, Greek: Γεώργιος Καραγιάννης), was born in Kozani, in the Ottoman province of Rumelia (now in Greece), leaving for Vienna in 1767, and eventually Chemnitz, Electorate of Saxony. He married Zoe Domnando, a Greek from Constantinople and Herbert's great-great-grandmother. Herbert's great-grandfather was Theodor Georg Ritter von Karajan, attended the Greek school of Vienna and became the first holder of the Chair of German Language and Literature at the University of Vienna; he received many awards, including an Austrian knighthood. This Greek ancestry of Herbert later helped secure the first invitation for the Berlin Philharmonic to Greece after World War II.

Georg and his brother participated in the establishment of Saxony's cloth industry, and both were ennobled for their services by Frederick Augustus III on 1 June 1792, thus adding the prefix "von" to the family name. This usage disappeared with the abolition of Austrian nobility after World War I. The surname Karajánnis became Karajan. Although traditional biographers ascribed a Slovak and Serbian or simply a Slavic origin to his mother, Aromanian heritage has also been claimed. In an article published in the newspaper Timpul, the Romanian writer Mihai Eminescu includes academician Theodor von Karajan, Herbert's great-grandfather, in a list of Aromanians from Vienna, mentioning that the world considered them Greeks because people were unaware of the existence of the Aromanians. Karajan's family from the maternal side, through his grandfather who was born in the village of Mojstrana, Duchy of Carniola (today in Slovenia), was Slovene. Through the Slovene line, Karajan was related to the Slovenian-Austrian composer Hugo Wolf. He also seems to have known some Slovene.

==== Childhood and education ====
Coat of arms of the Karajan family, granted in 1869

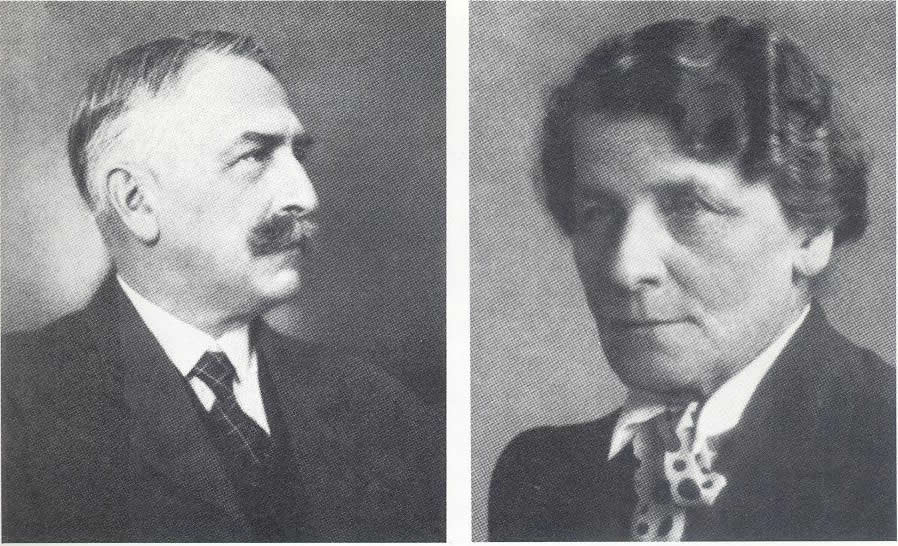
Herbert von Karajan's parents, Ernst von Karajan and his wife, Marta von Karajan (née Kosmač)

Heribert Adolf Ernst Karajan was born in Salzburg, Austria-Hungary, the second son of physician (surgeon) and senior consultant Ernst von Karajan (1868–1951) and Marta (née Martha Kosmač; 1881–1954) (married 1905). Karajan learned to play the piano as a young boy, and from 1916 to 1926, he studied at the Mozarteum in Salzburg with Franz Ledwinka (piano), Franz Sauer (harmony), and Bernhard Paumgartner (composition and chamber music).

He was encouraged to concentrate on conducting by Paumgartner, who detected his exceptional promise in that regard. In 1926, Karajan graduated from the conservatory and continued his studies at the Vienna Academy, studying piano with Josef Hofmann (a teacher with the same name as the pianist) and conducting with Alexander Wunderer and Franz Schalk.

=== Career ===
==== Early engagement ====
Karajan made his debut as a conductor in Salzburg on 22 January 1929. The performance came to the attention of the general manager of the Stadttheater in Ulm and led to Karajan's first appointment as assistant Kapellmeister of the theater. His senior colleague in Ulm was Otto Schulmann. After Schulmann was forced to leave Germany in 1933 with the Nazi Party takeover, Karajan was promoted to first Kapellmeister.

==== Nazi years ====
In the postwar era, Karajan maintained silence about his Nazi Party membership, which gave rise to a number of conflicting stories about it. One version is that because of the changing political climate and the destabilization of his position, Karajan attempted to join the Nazi Party in Salzburg in April 1933, but his membership was later declared invalid because he somehow failed to follow up on the application and that Karajan formally joined the Nazi Party in Aachen in 1935, implying that he was not eager to pursue membership. More recent scholarship clears up this confusion:

...the truth is that Karajan actually joined the Nazi Party twice. The first time this happened was on 8 April 1933 in Salzburg. He paid the admission fee, received the membership number 1607525 and moved to Ulm. It is said that this accession was never formally carried out. It is also certain that Karajan rejoined the Nazi Party in Aachen in March 1935, this time receiving the membership number 3430914. After the annexation of Austria, the responsible Reich Treasurer of the Nazi Party discovered Karajan's double membership in Munich and declared the first accession invalid. The second was made retroactive to 1 May 1933.

During the entire Nazi era he "never hesitated to open his concerts with the Nazi favorite 'Horst-Wessel-Lied', but "always maintained he joined strictly for career reasons." His enemies called him "SS Colonel von Karajan".

In 1933, Karajan made his conducting debut at the Salzburg Festival with the Walpurgisnacht Scene in Max Reinhardt's production of Faust. In Salzburg in 1934, Karajan led the Vienna Philharmonic for the first time, and from 1934 to 1941, he was engaged to conduct operatic and orchestral concerts at the Theater Aachen.

Karajan's career received a significant boost in 1935 when he became Germany's youngest Generalmusikdirektor, at Aachen, and performed as a guest conductor in Bucharest, Brussels, Stockholm, Amsterdam and Paris. In 1938, Karajan made his debut with the Berlin Philharmonic. That same year, he made his debut with the Berlin State Opera conducting Fidelio, and then had a major success at the State Opera with Tristan und Isolde. His performance was hailed by a Berlin critic as Das Wunder Karajan (Karajan the miracle). The critic wrote that Karajan's "success with Wagner's demanding work Tristan und Isolde sets himself alongside Wilhelm Furtwängler and Victor de Sabata, the greatest opera conductors in Germany at the present time". Receiving a contract with Deutsche Grammophon that same year, Karajan made the first of numerous recordings, conducting the Staatskapelle Berlin in the overture to The Magic Flute.

==== World War II ====
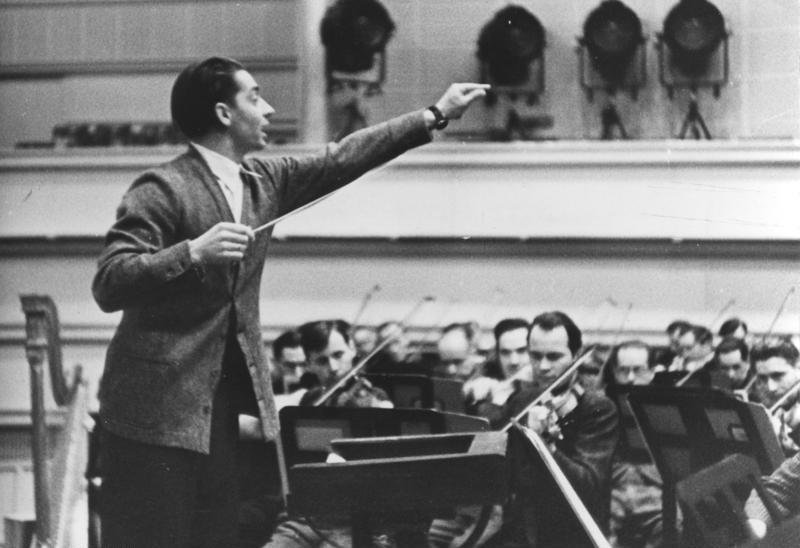
Herbert von Karajan conducting in 1941

Karajan's career continued to thrive at the beginning of the war. In 1939, the Berlin State Opera appointed him State Kapellmeister and conductor of concerts by the Prussian State Orchestra. He then became music director of the Staatskapelle Berlin, with which he toured Rome with extraordinary success. The next year, his contract in Aachen was discontinued. His marriage to Anita Gütermann (with one Jewish grandparent) and the prosecution of his agent Rudolf Vedder also contributed to his temporary professional decline, leaving him few engagements beyond a limited season of concerts with the Staatskapelle. However, the subscription concerts he conducted with the Staatskapelle during the war were critically acclaimed and generated great media interest.

By 1944, Karajan was, by his account, losing favour with the Nazi leadership, but he conducted concerts in Berlin as late as 18 February 1945. A short time later, in the closing stages of the war, he and his wife fled Germany for Milan, relocating with the assistance of Victor de Sabata.

Karajan's increased prominence from 1933 to 1945 has led to speculation that he joined the Nazi Party solely to advance his career. Critics such as Jim Svejda have pointed out that other prominent conductors, such as Arturo Toscanini, Otto Klemperer, Erich Kleiber, and Fritz Busch, fled Germany or Italy at the time. Richard Osborne noted that among the many significant conductors who continued to work in Germany during the war years—Wilhelm Furtwängler, Carl Schuricht, Karl Böhm, Hans Knappertsbusch, Clemens Krauss and Karl Elmendorff—Karajan was one of the youngest and thus one of the least advanced in his career. He was allowed to conduct various orchestras and was free to travel, even to the Netherlands to conduct the Concertgebouw Orchestra and make recordings there in 1943. He conducted for an audience of 300 Nazi armaments officials at a conference convened by Albert Speer in Linz, Austria, on 24–25 June 1944. In September 1944, he was listed on the Gottbegnadeten list (God-gifted list of artists exempt from mobilisation).

Karajan's denazification tribunal, held in Vienna on 15 March 1946, cleared him of illegal activity during the Nazi period. The Austrian denazification examining board discharged Karajan on 18 March 1946, and he resumed conducting shortly thereafter. Years later, former West German chancellor Helmut Schmidt said of Karajan's Nazi party membership card, "Karajan was obviously not a Nazi. He was a Mitläufer."

==== Postwar years ====
In 1946, Karajan gave his first postwar concert in Vienna with the Vienna Philharmonic, but was banned from further conducting by the Soviet occupation authorities because of his Nazi party membership. That summer he participated anonymously in the Salzburg Festival.

External audio
- Karajan conducting Johannes Brahms' A German Requiem with the Vienna Philharmonic, Elisabeth Schwarzkopf and Hans Hotter in 1947

On 28 October 1947, Karajan gave his first public concert following the lifting of the conducting ban. With the Vienna Philharmonic and the Gesellschaft der Musikfreunde, he performed Johannes Brahms's A German Requiem for a gramophone production in Vienna.

In 1949, Karajan became artistic director of the Gesellschaft der Musikfreunde, Vienna. He also conducted at La Scala in Milan. His most prominent activity at this time was recording with the newly formed Philharmonia Orchestra in London, helping to build them into one of the world's finest. Starting from this year, Karajan began his lifelong attendance at the Lucerne Festival.

In 1951 and 1952, Karajan conducted at the Bayreuth Festspielhaus.

==== West Berlin appointment ====
During its 1955 tour of the United States, Karajan's past membership in the Nazi Party led to the Berlin Philharmonic's concerts being banned in Detroit, and Philadelphia Orchestra music director Eugene Ormandy refused to shake Karajan's hand. Upon arriving in New York City for a concert at Carnegie Hall, Karajan and the Berlin Philharmonic were confronted by protests and picketers.

In 1956, Karajan was appointed principal conductor for life of the Berlin Philharmonic as Furtwängler's successor.

From 1957 to 1964, Karajan was artistic director of the Vienna State Opera, where he broke with tradition by insisting that operas with non-German librettos be performed in their original languages rather than German translation. He was closely involved with the Vienna Philharmonic and the Salzburg Festival, where he initiated the Easter Festival, which remained tied to the Berlin Philharmonic's music director after his tenure.

==== Last years ====
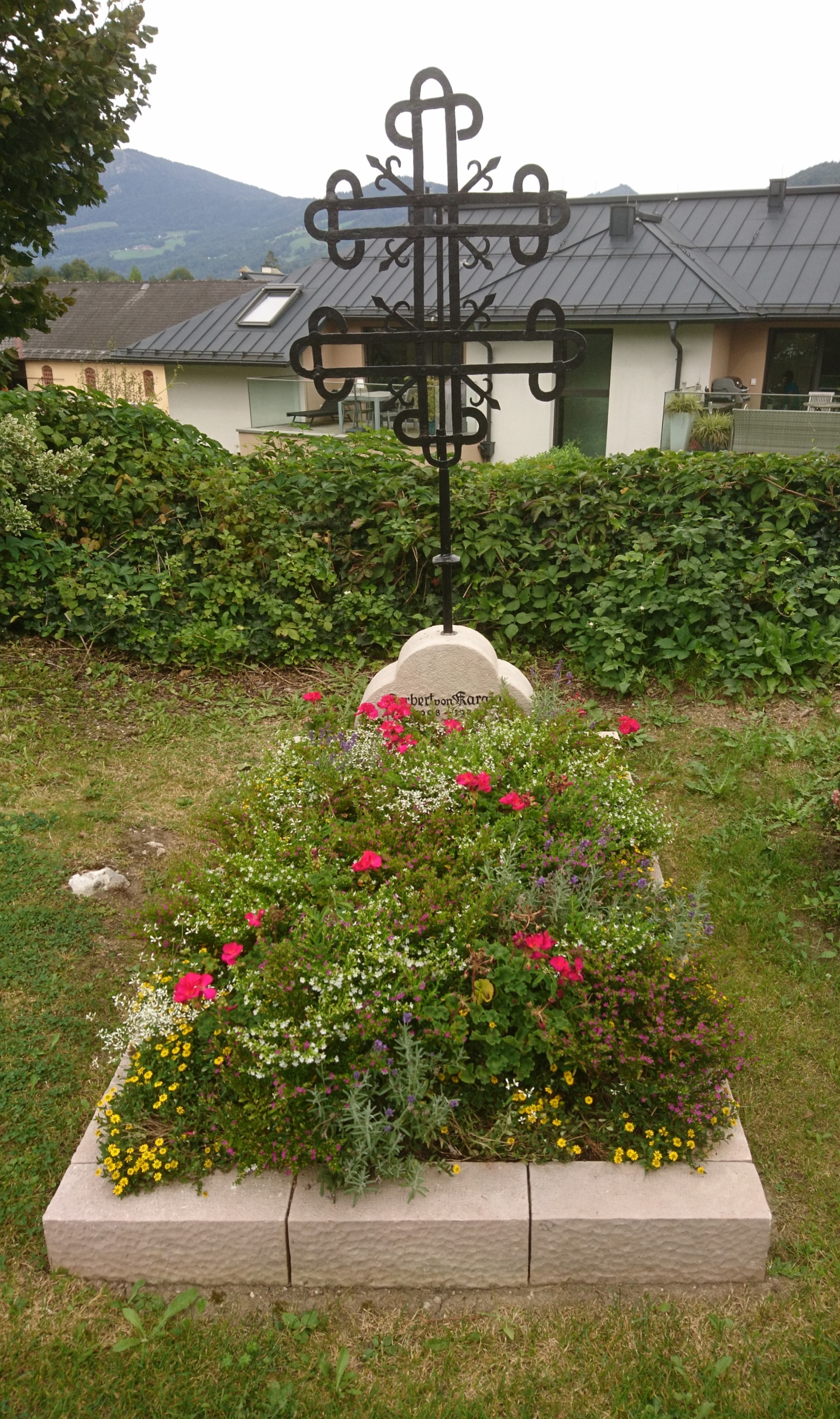
Karajan's grave in the churchyard of Anif parish church, just outside Salzburg

In his later years, Karajan suffered from heart and back problems, needing surgery on the latter. He resigned as principal conductor of the Berlin Philharmonic on 24 April 1989. His last concert was Bruckner's 7th Symphony with the Vienna Philharmonic. He died of a heart attack at his home in Anif on 16 July 1989 at the age of 81. The following day, in accordance with his wishes, he was buried without a funeral ceremony in the local cemetery in Anif. His estate was estimated at over half a billion German marks (approximately 256 million euros).

Karajan believed in reincarnation and said he would like to be reborn as an eagle so he could soar over his beloved Alps. Even so, on 29 June 1985, he conducted Wolfgang Amadeus Mozart's Coronation Mass during a Mass celebrated by Pope John Paul II in St. Peter's Basilica, on the Feast of Saints Peter and Paul, and with his wife and daughters received Holy Communion from the hand of the pope. By the end of his life he had reconciled with the Catholic Church, and requested a Catholic burial.

=== Personal life ===
==== Marriages and children ====
Karajan was married three times. He married his first wife, Elmy Holgerloef, an operetta singer, on 26 July 1938. He first worked with her on a 1935 New Year's Eve gala production of Strauss's Die Fledermaus. They divorced in 1942. Elmy died of heart failure in 1983. A statement from his Salzburg office stated that Karajan was "very shocked, affected, and deeply upset by the news. He had never forgotten her; she had been a part of his life." Karajan did not attend her funeral in Aachen.

On 22 October 1942, at the height of the Second World War, Karajan married his second wife, Anna Maria "Anita" Sauest, born Gütermann, the daughter of a well-known manufacturer of yarn for sewing machines. Having had a Jewish grandfather, she was considered a Vierteljüdin (one-quarter Jewish woman). They divorced in 1958.

On 6 October 1958, Karajan married his third wife, Eliette Mouret, a French model born in Mollans-sur-Ouvèze. She had enjoyed a carefree childhood growing up in Provence before being discovered by Christian Dior when she was 18. This laid the foundation for an international modelling career. Karajan first met Mouret in 1957 and was deeply taken with her. Their first daughter, Isabel, was born on 25 June 1960. In 1964, their second daughter, Arabel, was born.

After Karajan's death, Eliette continued his musical legacy by founding the Herbert von Karajan Centre in Vienna, now in Salzburg and known as the Eliette and Herbert von Karajan Institute. Her numerous projects focus particularly on the development of young people, and she is a patron of the Salzburg Easter Festival.

==== Hobbies ====
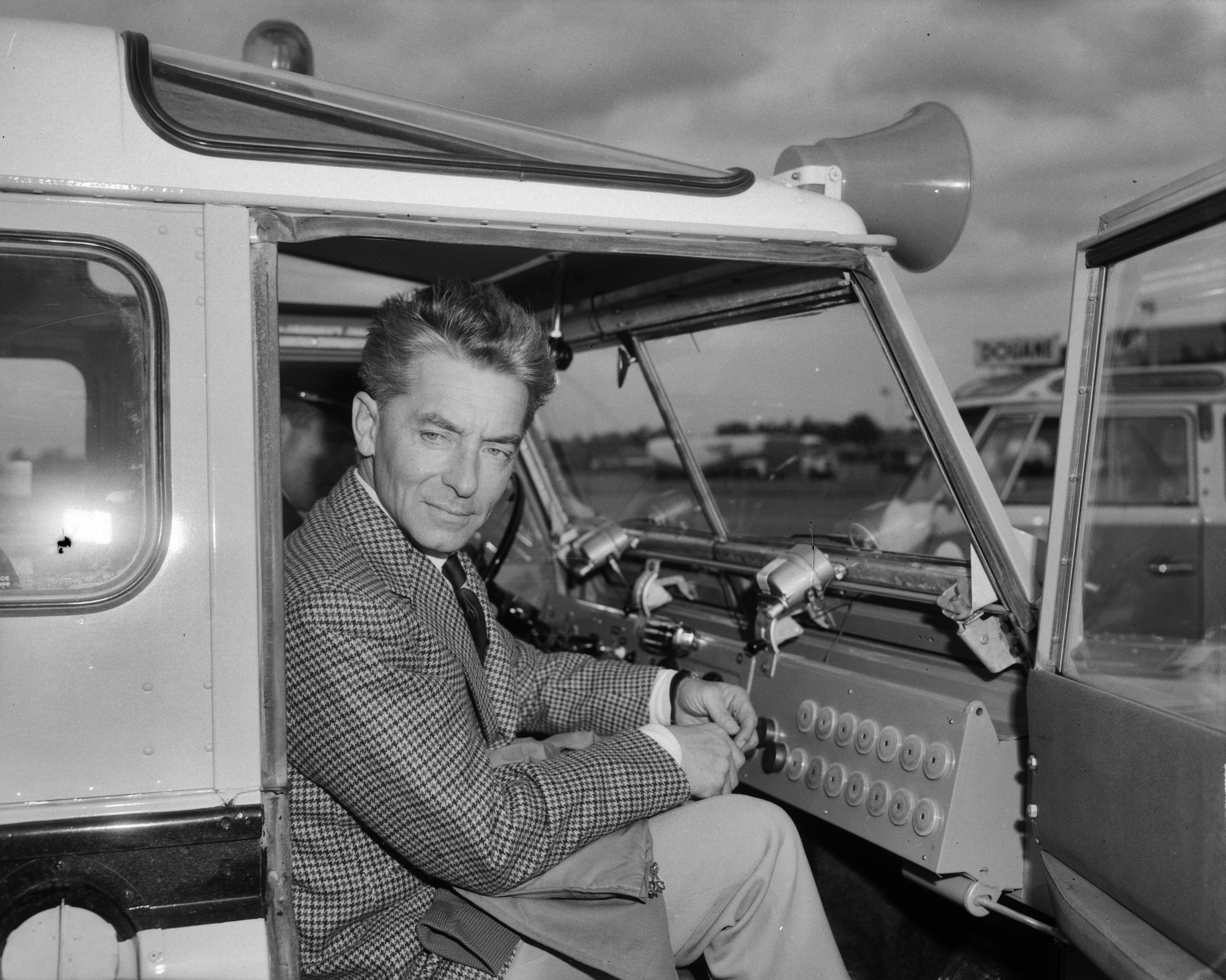
Herbert von Karajan at Amsterdam Airport Schiphol, Netherlands in 1963

Karajan had been a passionate sportsman since he was a teenager. He was a keen skier and swimmer and followed a daily yoga ritual. He won several regattas aboard his racing yacht, christened Helisara. He piloted his Learjet and was a great sailing and car enthusiast, particularly fond of Porsches. He ordered a specially configured Porsche 911 Turbo (type 930) with Martini & Rossi livery and his name on the back.

== Musicianship ==
One of Karajan's signature skills as a conductor was his ability to extract exquisite sounds from orchestras. His biographer Roger Vaughan observed this phenomenon while listening to the Berlin Philharmonic play in 1986, after nearly 30 years under Karajan's direction, noting that "what rivets one's attention is the beauty and perfection of the sounds. The softest of pianissimos commands rapt attention. The smooth crescendos peak exactly when they should. The breaks are sliced clean, without the slightest ragged edge."

=== Conducting style ===
Perhaps the most distinctive feature of Karajan's conducting style was his propensity to conduct with his eyes closed. This is highly unusual for a conductor, as eye contact is generally regarded as of paramount importance to the conductor's communication with the orchestra. Yet, as Vaughan remarked: "[h]ere is one of the fascinating aspects of conducting: there are no rules, only guidelines. The most eccentric approach is tolerated if the results are successful." Indeed, James Galway, who served as principal flutist of the Berlin Philharmonic from 1969 to 1975, recalled that "he [Karajan] achieved most of what he wanted through charm".

But there were reasons for many of Karajan's eccentricities. Conducting with his eyes closed, for instance, was a consequence of memorizing scores; keeping his eyes closed helped him keep focus. Karajan's method of score study, too, was somewhat unusual, as noted by his friend Walter Legge, who remarked:

He is one of the few conductors I have known who has never made a mark in a score. He will absorb a score quietly sitting on the floor, like a relaxed Siamese cat. Over the years he has learned how completely to relax the body so the mind is absolutely free to do what it wants.

Karajan was also known for his preternaturally keen sense of tempo, even going so far as to have himself tested against a computer to prove it. He insisted that this skill was learned, not inherited, and considered it the bedrock of musical interpretations.

He cited inconsistencies in rhythmic accuracy and control as "one thing that might make me lose my temper. I can accept a wrong note from an orchestra but when everything is getting faster or slower, that I cannot accept."

He once explained to a German journalist why he preferred the Berlin to the Vienna Philharmonic: "If I tell the Berliners to step forward, they do it. If I tell the Viennese to step forward, they do it, but then they ask why."

=== Musical tastes ===
Karajan was a noted interpreter of virtually every standard of the classical repertoire, from the Baroque era to the 20th century. He was an admirer of Glenn Gould's interpretations of Bach, performing the D minor Keyboard Concerto with him on one occasion. The eminent Haydn scholar H. C. Robbins Landon considered Karajan's recordings of the 12 London Symphonies as some of the finest he knew, and his multiple Beethoven cycles are still staples.

Yet Karajan's real interests seem to have lain in the period from the late 19th to the mid-20th centuries. Principal among these were his fascinations with the composers Anton Bruckner and Jean Sibelius. In a 1981 interview with Gramophone's Robert Layton, Karajan remarked that he felt "a much deeper influence, affinity, kinship—call it what you like—[in Sibelius's music] with Bruckner. There is this sense of the Urwald, the primaeval forest, the feeling of elemental power, that one is dealing with something profound." When pressed about this connection toward the end of his life by his biographer Osborne, Karajan echoed some of these sentiments, saying:

There is in both [Bruckner and Sibelius] a sense of the elemental. But I have often asked myself what it is that drew me to Sibelius's music and I think it is that he is a composer who cannot really be compared to anyone else. ... And you never come to an end with him. I think it is perhaps also to do with my love of remote places, my love of mountains rather than cities.

Layton demystifies this relationship somewhat by observing that:

[s]tring tremolandi and pedal points are, of course, among [the similarities between Bruckner and Sibelius], and we hear Brucknerian echoes in the development section of the first movement of Kullervo, written only a year or so after Sibelius first heard Bruckner's Third Symphony in Vienna.

Yet the most potent assessment of Karajan's interpretation of Sibelius's music came from Sibelius himself, who, according to Legge, said, "Karajan is the only conductor who plays what I meant."

Karajan was also a prolific opera conductor, championing the works of Wagner, Verdi, Richard Strauss and Puccini. Verdi's last opera, Falstaff, was something of a mainstay throughout Karajan's career. In his conversations with Osborne, Karajan recalled that, in the 1930s, when Italian opera was still something of a rarity in Austria and Germany:

[M]y training in Verdi's Falstaff came from Toscanini. There wasn't a rehearsal in either Vienna or Salzburg at which I wasn't present. I think I heard about thirty. From Toscanini I learnt the phrasing and the words—always with Italian singers, which was unheard of in Germany then. I don't think I ever opened the score. It was so in my ears, I just knew it.

Karajan went on to make two recordings of Falstaff—one for His Master's Voice in 1956 and another for Philips in 1980—and his colleague Otto Klemperer hailed the Vienna State Opera production as "really excellent". Strauss was likewise a continual force in Karajan's life, not just as a composer, but as a conductor. Karajan recounted their only "proper" meeting, in 1939, to Osborne:

[A]t the end [of a performance of Elektra in Berlin] he came and said to me it was the best performance of the opera he had ever heard. I said, "I don't really want to hear this; tell me what was wrong with it." I think he was surprised by my reaction, so he asked me to lunch the next day. He said, "You have made the music very clear, the fp here, the accent there; but these are not at all important. Just wave your stick around a bit!" He made a gesture like stirring a pudding. But what he meant was, let the music flow more naturally.

=== Use of recording technology ===
Karajan conducted and recorded prolifically, mainly with the Berlin Philharmonic and the Vienna Philharmonic. He conducted other orchestras (including the NHK Symphony Orchestra, the New York Philharmonic, the Concertgebouw Orchestra, the Orchestre de Paris, the Orchestra of Teatro alla Scala, Milan and the Staatskapelle Dresden), but the vast majority of his recordings were made with the Berlin and Vienna orchestras. He also left a considerable legacy of recordings with the Philharmonia Orchestra, his last performance being in 1960.

Although he made recordings with several labels, notably EMI, it is Deutsche Grammophon with which he became most associated, making 330 recordings with it. Karajan's 1981 Deutsche Grammophon recording of An Alpine Symphony with the Berlin Philharmonic became the first work ever to be pressed on the compact disc format. Even though his repertoire had been extensively covered in analog (LP record), he spent the rest of the 1980s making digital recordings, notably rerecording Beethoven's symphonies (Karajan and the Berlin Philharmonic's 1977 analog recording of Beethoven's Symphony No. 3 won the Grand Prix du Disque, while their 1984 digital recording of it was not particularly critically acclaimed yet sold considerably more). In the mid-1990s, Deutsche Grammophon released the Karajan Gold series, remixes of Karajan's 1980s digital recordings enhanced by 24-bit processing.

Karajan filmed performances of his work for both Unitel and his own company, Telemondial.

=== Critical reception ===
The so-called Karajan sound remains something of a litmus test for critics, dividing them into two competing camps. Two reviews from the Penguin Guide to Compact Discs illustrate this point:

- Of a 1971–72 studio recording of Tristan und Isolde, the Penguin authors wrote, "Karajan's is a sensual performance of Wagner's masterpiece, caressingly beautiful and with superbly refined playing from the Berlin Philharmonic".
- Of Karajan's recording of Haydn's "Paris" symphonies, the same authors wrote, "big-band Haydn with a vengeance ... It goes without saying that the quality of the orchestral playing is superb. However, these are heavy-handed accounts, closer to Imperial Berlin than to Paris ... the Minuets are very slow indeed ... These performances are too charmless and wanting in grace to be whole-heartedly recommended."

The New York Times writer John Rockwell wrote in his Karajan obituary in 1989: "He had a particular gift for Wagner and above all for Bruckner, whose music he conducted with sovereign command and elevated feeling."

== Legacy ==
Karajan's concerts came to be considered major cultural events. In a 1982 tour of the United States, musical stars from Zubin Mehta and Seiji Ozawa to Frank Sinatra attended his Carnegie Hall concerts. Karajan was less interested in publicity or legacy than in building the cultural institution of music. "When I am on the podium, I forget all about the public", he said. "I am not interested in publicity. I can only hope there is an advantage to my being known in the world, that through the interest people take in me, they will then move on to an interest in music."

Much of Karajan's legacy is inextricable from his pioneering attitude toward recording technology. He made over 800 recordings, far surpassing the output of other contemporary conductors. Biographer Richard Osborne estimates that Karajan sold more than 200 million recordings. The West German news weekly Der Spiegel reported that he earned more than $6 million annually from record sales and conducting fees in 1989. Karajan amassed a fortune valued at 250 million euros as of 2008, remaining one of the top-selling classical music artists two decades after his death.

=== Relationships with other conductors ===
Despite Karajan's significant prowess as a conductor, he was more often seen behind the camera than in the teaching studio, preferring to record rehearsals rather than give masterclasses. He maintained a long friendship with Ozawa, whose success makes him Karajan's most outstanding student. Indeed, Ozawa was reportedly a strong contender to succeed Karajan at the Berlin Philharmonic; Karajan called him the "conductor with the best character" for the position.

Karajan and American conductor/composer Leonard Bernstein respected each other and held no animosity, but sometimes practiced a little mutual one-upmanship such that they were described as fierce rivals. Bernstein collaborated with the Berlin Philharmonic only once, in 1979 when he conducted two concerts as part of the Berliner Festspiele in which he conducted Mahler's Ninth Symphony. It was often suggested that Bernstein could not conduct in Berlin while Karajan was alive (the Berlin Philharmonic was regarded as Karajan's own), the truth was that Berlin Philharmonic's managing director Wolfgang Stresemann actually invited Bernstein but as part of a subscription concert series, which Bernstein disliked.

During the Berlin Philharmonic's 1955 tour of the United States, Philadelphia Orchestra music director Eugene Ormandy refused to shake Karajan's hand, due to Karajan's past membership in the Nazi Party. Ormandy's Philadelphia Orchestra was regarded as the only real rival to Karajan's Berlin Philharmonic for sonic beauty from the 1950s to the 1970s, though Ormandy's was also a tighter and more versatile band.

=== Awards and honours ===
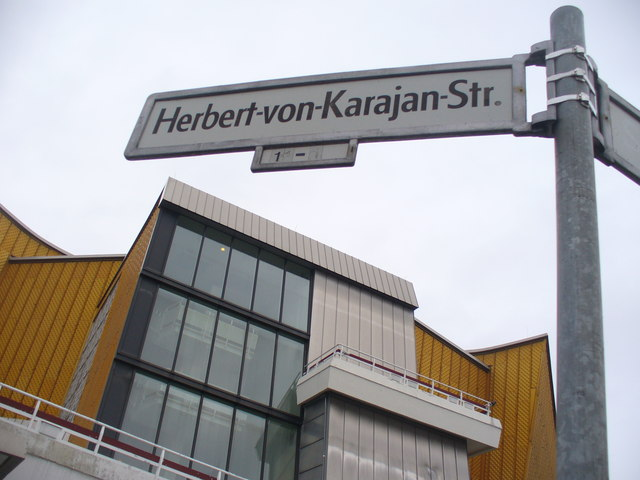
Street sign for Herbert-von-Karajan-Straße outside the Philharmonie in Berlin

Karajan was the recipient of multiple honours and awards. He became a Grand Officer of the Order of Merit of the Italian Republic on 17 May 1960, and in 1961 received the Austrian Medal for Science and Art. He also received the Grand Merit Cross (Grosses Bundesverdienstkreuz) of the Order of Merit of the Federal Republic of Germany.

Karajan was the recipient of numerous Grand Prix du Disque awards. In 1977, Karajan was awarded the Ernst von Siemens Music Prize. On 21 June 1978 he received an honorary doctorate from Oxford University. He received the Médaille de Vermeil from the Académie française in Paris, the Gold Medal of the Royal Philharmonic Society in London, the Olympia Award of the Onassis Foundation and the UNESCO International Music Prize. He received two Gramophone Awards for recordings of Mahler's Ninth Symphony and the complete Parsifal recordings in 1981. He received the Eduard Rhein Ring of Honor from the West German Eduard Rhein Foundation, in 1984. He was voted into the inaugural Gramophone Hall of Fame in 2012. He received the Picasso Medal from UNESCO.

From 2003 to 2015, the Festspielhaus Baden-Baden awarded the annual Herbert von Karajan Music Prize in recognition of excellence in musical achievements. In 2003 Anne-Sophie Mutter, who had made her debut with Karajan in 1977, became the award's first recipient. In 2015 the award was replaced by the Herbert von Karajan Prize, presented at the Salzburg Easter Festival.

Karajan was an honorary citizen of Salzburg (1968), West Berlin (1973) and Vienna (1978). Since 2005, his legacy has been managed by the Eliette and Herbert von Karajan Institute.

==== Grammy Awards ====
Karajan's multiple Grammy Awards make him a particularly prominent conductor historically; he received 40 Grammy nominations across nearly 30 years. He was a three-time Grammy Award recipient, winning Best Opera Recording award for Bizet's Carmen in 1964 and Wagner's Siegfried in 1969 and Best Classical Orchestral Performance for a Beethoven symphony cycle in 1978. Karajan's Beethoven cycles remain some of the most popular and enduring worldwide, as well as the most critically acclaimed recordings of the past century.

==== Monuments ====
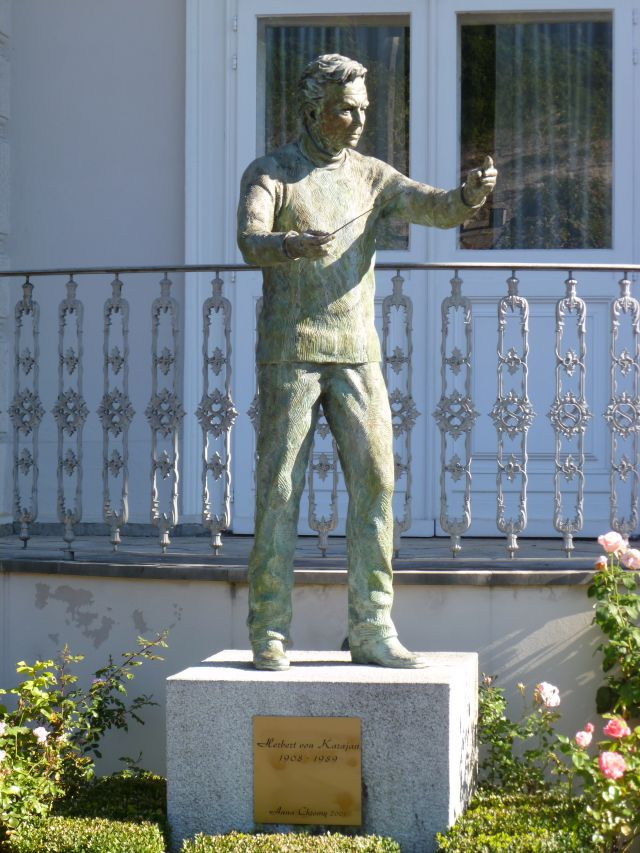
Statue of Herbert von Karajan at his birthplace, Salzburg

Karajan has remained a visible part of everyday life in the cities he once called home, thanks in part to monuments erected in his honour. In Salzburg, for instance, the Karajan Foundation of Vienna commissioned the Czech artist Anna Chromý to create a life-sized statue of him, which now stands outside his birthplace.

In 1983, a bronze bust of Karajan was unveiled in the foyer of West Berlin's new State Theatre.

=== In popular culture ===
Two of Karajan's interpretations were popularized through their inclusion in the soundtrack of the film 2001: A Space Odyssey. Most famously, the version of Johann Strauss's The Blue Danube heard during the film's early outer space scenes is that of Karajan with the Berlin Philharmonic. The version of Richard Strauss's Also sprach Zarathustra used in the film is that of Karajan with the Vienna Philharmonic. (Note: Although Karajan's version of Zarathustra is the one which is actually used in the film, the original soundtrack release instead used a different version not conducted by Karajan; later re-issues of the soundtrack restored Karajan's version.)

=== Selected discography ===
Signing a contract with Deutsche Grammophon in 1938, Karajan was noted for his studious perfectionism in his symphonic recordings, as well as numerous opera recordings by Verdi and Puccini, in particular those with Maria Callas. Other Karajan recordings with the Berlin Philharmonic include Also sprach Zarathustra, Der Ring des Nibelungen, and Mahler's Symphony No. 5.

During Karajan's lifetime, the public associated him with the works of Beethoven. Karajan recorded four complete Beethoven symphony cycles, first with the Philharmonia Orchestra for Angel in 1951 to 1955, and then three times with the Berlin Philharmonic Orchestra for Deutsche Grammophon in 1961–62, 1975–76, and 1982–84.

Among 20th-century musical works, Karajan had a preference for conducting and recording works from the first half of the century, by such composers as Mahler, Schoenberg, Berg, Webern, Bartók, Sibelius, Richard Strauss, Puccini, Honegger, Prokofiev, Debussy, Ravel, Hindemith, Nielsen, Stravinsky and Holst. Performances of works written after 1950 included Shostakovich's Tenth Symphony (1953), which he performed many times and recorded twice. He and Shostakovich met during a tour with the Berlin Philharmonic culminating in Moscow in May 1969.

See also:
- Debussy: Pelléas et Mélisande (Karajan recording)
- Mozart: Le nozze di Figaro (Karajan recording)

Karajan said in a 1983 interview with the West German TV channel ZDF that if he had been a composer instead of conductor, his music would have been similar to Shostakovich's. Karajan conducted the Berlin Philharmonic in Hans Werner Henze's Sonata per Archi (1958) and Antifone (1960). In 1960 he performed Ildebrando Pizzetti's 1958 opera Assassinio nella cattedrale. Karajan premiered Carl Orff's De temporum fine comoedia in 1973 with the Cologne Radio Symphony Orchestra and recorded it for Deutsche Grammophon.

=== Controversies ===
In 2023 the Theater Aachen removed a bust of Karajan from the foyer of the house due to his significant involvement in the Nazi era, planning to replace it with a bust of Mozart.

== Notes ==
=== Sources ===
- Burton, Humphrey (1995). Leonard Bernstein. London: Faber and Faber. ISBN 978-0-571-17368-6. OCLC 32510075.
- von Karajan, Herbert (1989). Osborne, Richard (ed.). Conversations with von Karajan (1st US ed.). New York: Harper & Row. ISBN 0-06-039107-3. OCLC 21042949.
- Osborne, Richard (2000). Herbert von Karajan: A Life in Music. Boston: Northeastern University Press. ISBN 1-55553-425-2.
- Rathert, Wolfgang (2026). Herbert von Karajan. Macht – Ohnmacht – Vermächtnis [incl. a detailed bibliography of sources and secondary literature, as well as a complete list of Karajan's opera productions and music films]. München: edition text + kritik. ISBN 978-3-96707-618-9.
- Vaughan, Roger (1985). Herbert von Karajan : A Biographical Portrait (1st ed.). New York: W. W. Norton. ISBN 0-393-02224-2. OCLC 11814326.

Cultural offices
Preceded by Peter Raabe	Generalmusikdirektor, Theater Aachen; 1935–1942	Succeeded by Paul van Kempen
