= Anna Renfer =

Swiss composer

Anna Margaretha Spoerri Renfer (1896-1984) was a Swiss composer who wrote music for cello, piano, and voice.

Renfer was born in Biel/Bienne. She studied piano as a child, then attended the Bern Conservatory, the University of Bern, the Conservatory of Bienne, and studied privately in Gstaad. Her teachers included Adrian Aeschbacher, Edwin Fischer, Ernst Levy, Josef Pembauer, Hermann Scherchen, and Rudolf Serkin.

Renfer's music was published by Hug (today Gebrüder Hug & Co.) Her compositions included:

== Chamber ==
- Sonata in c minor (cello and piano)

== Piano ==
- Studies for the Left Hand

== Vocal ==
- 44 Songs
- “Bridal song for High Voice”
- Eight Songs for Soprano
- Sacred Chants (a cappella and for chorus; text by Josef Reinhart)
