= Fritz Heitmann =

German classical organist

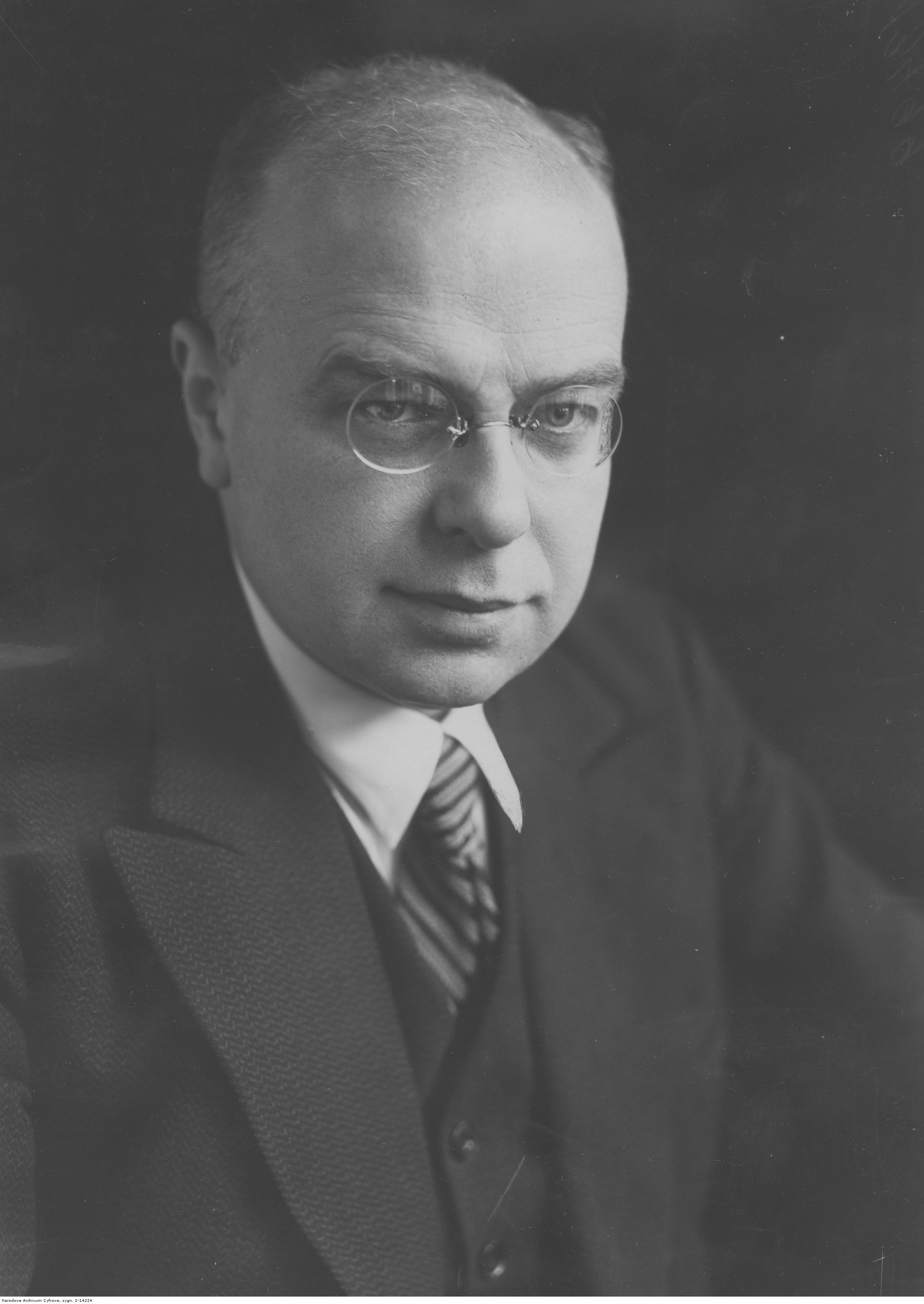
Image of Fritz Heitmann

Fritz Heitmann (9 May 1891 – 7 September 1953) was a German organist.

== Life ==
Born in Ochsenwerder, Heitmann's first training in organ playing was with his father, who was also an organist. Later he attended the Bernuth Conservatory in Hamburg. From 1909, he was at the University of Music and Theatre Leipzig a student of Karl Straube, Max Reger and Josef Pembaur.

In 1912, he took over his first organist position at the cathedral in Schleswig. During the First World War, Heitmann worked in the military hospital administration in Namur.

In 1918, Kaiser Wilhelm II, German Emperor appointed him organist at the Kaiser-Wilhelm-Gedächtniskirche in Berlin. From the following year, Heitmann was also organist at the Sing-Akademie zu Berlin. On 1 May 1932, he moved to the Berliner Dom as cathedral organist, where he also initiated the series of cathedral vespers, which has been maintained to this day. Numerous concert tours took him through Europe, Russia and the US.

From 1923, Heitmann taught at the Berlin Academy for School and Church Music, where he was appointed professor in 1925. Later, he also held lectureships at the Stern Conservatory and the Universität der Künste Berlin. In 1923, Heitmann founded the Berlin Motet Association.

Shortly before the end of the Second World War, he was included in the Gottbegnadeten list compiled by Joseph Goebbels as one of two organists.

Heitmann was considered an important Bach interpreter. In 1938, he recorded the Deutsche Orgelmesse for Telefunken on the Arp Schnitger organ of Schloss Charlottenburg, in 1950 he made one of the first recordings of Bach's Die Kunst der Fuge for the same label.

Like the Schnitger organ in Charlottenburg, the Sauer Organ of the Kaiser Wilhelm Memorial Church was destroyed in bombing raids in 1943. However, there are ten recordings on shellac records from 1929 and 1930 on which the sound of this organ, played by Fritz Heitmann, was recorded.

Heitmann died in Berlin at the age of 62.

== Recordings ==
- Die Arp Schnitger-Orgel in der Eosander-Kapelle des Charlottenburger Schlosses – Bach "Dritter Theil der Clavier-Übung" (Deutsche Orgelmesse). LP. Teldec.
- Die Sauer-Orgel im Dom zu Berlin – Fritz Heitmann. J. S. Bach, H. Grabner, M. Reger, Rundfunk-Aufnahmen von 1940 und 1944. LP und CD bei Berlin Classics, CD erschienen 1995
- "Die Kunst der Fuge (BWV 1080)", Orgel der crypt des Berliner Doms. LP. Teldec. (recorded 19 May 1950)
