= Isabel Karajan =

Austrian actress (born 1960)

Isabel Karajan (born 25 June 1960 in Vienna) is an Austrian actress. She is a daughter of Herbert von Karajan and Eliette von Karajan.

== Life ==
After completing her Matura, Isabel Karajan studied acting in Vienna and Paris. She had her first acting engagements with the playhouses in Zurich and Stuttgart, the Thalia theatre Hamburg, the theatre Der Kreis in Vienna and the Théâtre National de la Colline. From 1995 to 1998 Isabel Karajan played the part of the Good Works in Jedermann at the Salzburg Festival. She also performed in Avignon and Adelaide, Australia, as well as at the Teatro Colón in Buenos Aires, the Schauspielhaus Stuttgart, the Münchner Kammerspiele and at the Schaubühne in Berlin. In 2000, she appeared in Jeanne d'Arc au bûcher by Arthur Honegger at the Saito-Kinen Festival in Japan. It's the extraordinary projects that are close to Isabel Karajan's heart. She has been developing her own projects for solo theatrical performances, chamber music or large orchestra with directors such as Klaus Ortner, Jorge Lavelli, Julian Pölsler, Christina Pfrötschner and others for several years. At the Shostakovich Days in Gohrisch, the Salzburg Easter Festival, the Diaghilev Festival of Currentzis in Perm, the Soli Deo Gloria Festival in Goslar and the Kfar Blum Festival in Israel, she presented "Miss Death meets Mr. Shostakovich ", a scenic collage on fear with chamber music by Shostakovich and texts by his contemporaries. Together with members of the Berliner Philharmoniker and the Bamberg Symphony Orchestra, she appeared on stage in Stravinsky's "The Story of the Soldier" and also played "Eight Songs for a Mad King" by Peter Maxwell Davies. At the Saito-Kinen Festival in Japan, she appeared as "Jeanne d`Arc au bûcher" by Arthur Honegger. In 2015, under the direction of Julian Pölsler, "Die Feuerprobe" with poems by Christine Lavant and Op. 40 by Shostakovich. Furthermore, Isabel Karajan, in collaboration with the director Christina Pfrötschner, created a word music collage for the Midsummer Night's Dream.

In 2016, Isabel Karajan starred in Bernstein's "Candide" with the Hamburg Symphony Orchestra under the direction of Jeffrey Tate. This was followed in 2017 by Edgar A. Poe's "The Mask of the Red Death" at the Swiss Alp Classic Festival in Andermatt with Clemens Hellsberg and members of the Vienna Philharmonic. In the summer of 2018 she performed with the composer Beat Furrer at the Salzburg Festival with an interpretation of the "Wüstenbuch" fragment by Ingeborg Bachmann. As leading actress she was involved in the development and successful premiere of the opera "Stillhang" by Christian Spitzenstätter in December 2018 under the direction of Klaus Ortner. Shakespeare's "Midsummer Night's Dream" in the version by F. Mendelssohn Bartholdy described her from the point of view of an orchestra violist together with the Staatskapelle Dresden and the conductor Vladimir Jurowski in three concert evenings in the Semper Oper Dresden in 2019.

For several years, Isabel Karajan collaborated with directors Klaus Ortner, Julian Pölsler and Christina Pfrötschner on their own musical theater projects. She was also in numerous film and television productions by Wolfgang Murnberger, Holger Barthel, Nina Companéez, Alain Michel Blanc, Erhard Riedlsperger, Michi Riebl, Rupert Henning and Patricia Mazuy.

== Projects ==
- Hennir, by Antonio Fian, (directed by Hans-Peter Horner), with Isabel Karajan, world premiere Theater Nestroyhof Hamakom Vienna 2009
- 8 Songs for a Mad King by Peter Maxwell Davies (Director: Klaus Ortner) with Isabel Karajan, Performances: Rolandseck Festival 2013, Kfar Blum Festival 2014, Dresdner Kunstfest 2015
- Candide by Leonard Bernstein: A comic operetta in two acts (Realization: Klaus Ortner) with Isabel Karajan conducted by Sir Jeffrey Tate, the Hamburger Symphoniker, Performance: Laeiszhalle Hamburg 2016
- Die Feuerprobe, Director: Julian Pölsler, with Isabel Karajan Performances: Schostakowitsch Tage Gohrisch 2015, Sprudel, Sprudel & Musik 2015, RadioKulturhaus ORF Vienna 2015, Linz Brucknerhaus 2017, MuTH Vienna 2016
- The Soldier's Tale by Igor Strawinsky (Scenic Realization: Klaus Ortner), with Isabel Karajan, Performances: Salzburg Easter Festival 2011, Appenzell 2015, Hamburg Laeiszhalle 2015, Bamberg 2016, Bayreuth 2016, Frankfurt 2019
- Miss Death meets Mister Shostakovich: A scenic collage (Scenic Realization: Klaus Ortner) with Isabel Karajan, Performances: Schostakowitsch Tage Gohrisch 2014, Salzburg Easter Festival 2015, Soli Deo Gloria Festival Goslar 2016, Suntory Hall Japan 2016, Perm 2017, Festival von Theodor Currentzis
- Kreutzersonaten: Musical-literary collage about the Kreutzersonaten (Coordination: Klaus Ortner), with Isabel Karajan, Performance: Rolandseck Festival 2013
- Peter and the Wolf, (Director: Klaus Ortner) with Isabel Karajan, Christian Spitzenstätter, Mozarteum Orchester Salzburg, Performance: Salzburg 2016, Gohrisch at the International Shostakovich Days 2019
- A Midsummer Night's Dream, (Director: Christina Pfrötschner), with Isabel Karajan, Performance: Wettingen 2015
- The Masque of the Red Death, (Director: Klaus Ortner) with Isabel Karajan, Andermatt Swiss Chamber Ensemble, Performance: Andermatt Swiss Alps Classics 2017
- Das Wüstenbuch, (Beat Furrer), with Isabel Karajan, Salzburg Festival 2018, Switzerland 2019
- Stilhang, opera by Christian Spitzenstätter, (director: Klaus Ortner), with Isabel Karajan, world premiere of the Tiroler Festspiele in Erl in 2018
- A Midsummer Night's Dream, Felix Mendelssohn Bartholdy, (Director: Klaus Ortner), with Isabel Karajan, Conductor Vladimir Jurowski with the Staatskapelle Dresden, world premiere: Semper Oper Dresden 2019

== Filmography ==
=== TV ===
- 2017 Vier Frauen und ein Todesfall (Wolfgang Murnberger)
- 2016 Die Toten von Salzburg (Angelika Holzer)
- 2015 Tatort: Grenzfall (Dani Karger)
- 2014 SOKO Wien: Drehschluss (Nele Cox)
- 2011 Schnell ermittelt: Helmut Schafranek (Viktoria Throst)
- 2010 Tatort: Glaube, Liebe, Tod (Sieglinde Kaber)
- 2009 SOKO Wien: Alte Bekannte (Patrizia Manninger)
- 2006 Schlosshotel Orth: Neuanfänge
- 2003 SOKO Kitzbühel: Die Bestattung, Rolle: Frau Terhagen
- 2003 Julia – Eine ungewöhnliche Frau: In Vino Veritas
- 1998 La Poursuite du vent (Margot)
- 1996 Les Faux Médicaments (Mme. Fontanelle)
- 1995 Le retour d'Arsène Lupin: La robe de diamants

=== Movie ===
- 2011 Sport de filles (Patricia Mazuy)
- 2007 Der schwarze Löwe
- 2002 Ich gehöre dir (Lina Manz)
- 1996 Les faux médicaments
- 1994 Cognacq-Jay (Bertie)
- 1994 Ich bin den Sommer über in Berlin geblieben (Maria)
- 1989 Achterloo IV (Hide)
- 1983 Le grand échiquier: Coxteau vivant

== Discography ==
- 2012 Mozart und Zeitgenossen: Francesca Cardone / Isabel Karajan / Peter Simonischek
- 1983 Narrator in Carmen, Herbert von Karajan, Berliner Philharmoniker
