= Agnes Muthspiel =

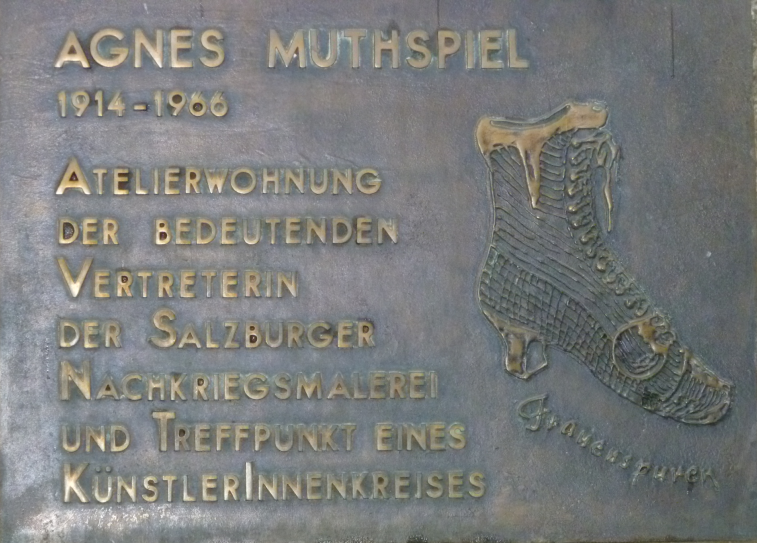
Muthspiel.png

Agnes Muthspiel (born Agnes Gahbauer: 8 February 1914 - 3 May 1966) was a Salzburg painter, representative of the "Salzburg Group" of artists that came to prominence during the 1950s.

== Life ==
"In the context of [Agnes Muthspiel's] work, "naive" means the unbroken unswerving direct way in which she translated her everyday vision of her life experience of things into painting. Everyday life for her was an intensive thing ... Agnes Muthspiel is the painter of a world in decline, which she neither mourns nor romanticises. She herself reaches out into the world: she herself was born in it."
"Naiv bedeutet, auf sie angewandt, die ungebrochene, unabgeleitete, direkte Art, mit der sie ihre Lebenserfahrung ihren alltäglichen Blick auf die Dinge in Malerei umsetzte. Ihr Alltag war intensiv. ... Agnes Muthspiel ist die Malerin einer untergehenden Welt, der sie aber nicht wehmütig oder romantisch nachblickte. Sie reichte selbst noch hinab, war dort eingeboren."

Gerhard Amanshauser

Agnes Gahbauer was born in Salzburg, the eldest daughter of Heinrich and Agnes Gahbauer. She attended junior school and then the so-called "Akademisches Gymnasium" (secondary school) in the city. In 1938, she married Dr. Hans Muthspiel, a junior judge. He was killed just three years while serving as a soldier on the Russian front. During the war years she received instruction at the cathedral presbytery, possibly in anticipation of entering a religious order. Later she was forced to relocate to Hanover. After the war she spent two terms studying Ethics and Logic as a Philosophy student at the University Theology faculty, back in Salzburg. There is no indication that she ever became a nun or completed her degree course, however.

In social terms, during the post-war years the young widow associated with a number of artists, such as Max Peiffer Watenphul, Caspar Neher and Herbert Breiter. Agnes Muthspiel herself became a self-taught artist and, starting in 1950, enjoyed growing success internationally. Her early work respected the newly rediscovered tradition of late expressionism, but she increasingly freed herself from fashionable preconceptions and became, in the best sense, a "naive artist". After 1974 she came to be seen as a precursor of the short-lived "Salzburger naiven" artistic movement. Agnes Muthspiel painted principally with oil paints, but there were also watercolours, sketches and prints. She loved to produce paintings of her home city, favouring in particular its various towers and semi-formal gardens. There were paintings of her own garden. There were also paintings of Rome, a city for which as a committed catholic she felt a special affinity, and of the island of Ponza which she visited frequently.

Agnes Muthspiel became ever more well connected socially among Salzburg's artistic-intellectual elite. Her circle of friends included the sculptor Toni Schneider-Manzell, the composers Gottfried von Einem and Carl Orff, the poets Werner Bergengruen and Gerhard Amanshauser, along with fellow artists Eduard Bäumer and Paul Flora and, indeed, the iconic polymath-dramatist Bertolt Brecht.

In 1966 Agnes Muthspiel was a recipient of the Theodor Körner Prize.
