= Karajan Gold =

Collection of recordings

The Karajan Gold series is a collection of thirty classic digital Deutsche Grammophon recordings by the 20th century Austrian conductor Herbert von Karajan, released began in 1993.

Composer	Title	Artist	Part number	Year of original release
Ludwig van Beethoven	Symphonies Nos. 1 & 2	Berlin Philharmonic	0289 439 001 2 6	1985
Ludwig van Beethoven	Symphony No. 3 "Eroica", Egmont Overture	Berlin Philharmonic	0289 439 002 2 5	1986
Ludwig van Beethoven	Symphonies Nos. 4 & 7	Berlin Philharmonic	0289 439 003 2 4	1985
Ludwig van Beethoven	Symphonies Nos. 5 & 6 "Pastorale"	Berlin Philharmonic	0289 439 004 2 3	1984
Ludwig van Beethoven	Symphony No. 8, Overtures "Leonore III" "Fidelio" Coriolan Overture	Berlin Philharmonic	0289 439 005 2 2	1986
Ludwig van Beethoven	Symphony No. 9 "Choral"	Perry, Baltsa, Cole, van Dam, Wiener Singverein, Berlin Philharmonic	0289 439 006 2 1	1984
Johannes Brahms	Violin Concerto & Double Concerto	Anne-Sophie Mutter, António Meneses, Berlin Philharmonic	0289 439 007 2 0	1982 (Violin Concerto); 1983 (Double Concerto)
Claude Debussy & Maurice Ravel	La Mer, Prélude à l'après-midi d'un faune, Daphnis et Chloé Suite No. 2, Pavane pour une infante défunte	Berlin Philharmonic	0289 439 008 2 9	1986
Antonín Dvořák & Bedřich Smetana	Symphony No. 9 "From the New World", Die Moldau	Wiener Philharmoniker	0289 439 009 2 8	1985
Anton Bruckner	Symphony No. 7	Wiener Philharmoniker	0289 439 037 2 1	1990
Edvard Grieg & Jean Sibelius	Suites 1 & 2, Holberg Suite, Finlandia, Der Schwan von Tuonela, Valse triste	Berlin Philharmonic	0289 439 010 2 4	1982 (Holberg Suite); 1983 (Peer Gynt Suites); 1984 (Sibelius)
Joseph Haydn	Symphony No. 94 "Surprise", Symphony No. 101 "The Clock"	Berlin Philharmonic	0289 439 038 2 0	1983
Gustav Holst	The Planets	Berlin Philharmonic	0289 439 011 2 3	1981
Gustav Mahler	Symphony No. 9	Berlin Philharmonic	0289 439 024 2 7	1984
Wolfgang Amadeus Mozart	Great Mass in C minor	Hendricks, Perry, Schreier, Luxon, Wiener Singverein, Berlin Philharmonic	0289 439 012 2 2	1982
Wolfgang Amadeus Mozart	Requiem	Tomowa-Sintow, Molinari, Cole, Burchuladze, Wiener Philharmoniker	0289 439 023 2 8	1987
Modest Mussorgsky & Maurice Ravel	Pictures at an Exhibition, Boléro, Rapsodie espagnole	Berlin Philharmonic	0289 439 013 2 1	1987
Camille Saint-Saëns	Symphony No. 3 "Organ"	Berlin Philharmonic	0289 439 014 2 0	1982
Robert Schumann & Edvard Grieg	Piano Concerto, Piano Concerto	Krystian Zimerman, Berlin Philharmonic	0289 439 015 2 9	1982
Dmitri Shostakovich	Symphony No. 10	Berlin Philharmonic	0289 439 036 2 2	1982
Richard Strauss	Also sprach Zarathustra, Don Juan	Berlin Philharmonic	0289 439 016 2 8	1984
Richard Strauss	Don Quioxte, Till Eulenspiegel's Merry Pranks	Berlin Philharmonic	0289 439 027 2 4	1987
Richard Strauss	Ein Heldenleben, Death and Transfiguration	Berlin Philharmonic	0289 439 039 2 9	1983 (Death and Transfiguration); 1986 (Ein Heldenleben)
Richard Strauss	An Alpine Symphony	Berlin Philharmonic	0289 439 017 2 7	1981
Pyotr Ilyich Tchaikovsky	Romeo and Juliet, The Nutcracker	Berlin Philharmonic	0289 439 021 2 0	1983
Pyotr Ilyich Tchaikovsky	Symphony No. 4	Wiener Philharmoniker	0289 439 018 2 6	1985
Pyotr Ilyich Tchaikovsky	Symphony No. 5	Wiener Philharmoniker	0289 439 019 2 5	1985
Pyotr Ilyich Tchaikovsky	Symphony No. 6 "Pathétique"	Wiener Philharmoniker	0289 439 020 2 1	1985
Giuseppe Verdi	Requiem	Tomowa-Sintow, Carreras, Konzertvereinigung Wiener Staatsopernchor, Vienna State Opera Chorus, Chorus of the National Opera Sofia; Vienna Philharmonic	0289 439 033 2 5	1985
Richard Wagner	Tannhäuser, Die Meistersinger von Nürnberg, Tristan und Isolde excerpts	Berlin Philharmonic	0289 439 022 2 9	1984
