= Theodor von Karajan =

Ritter Theodor von Karajan
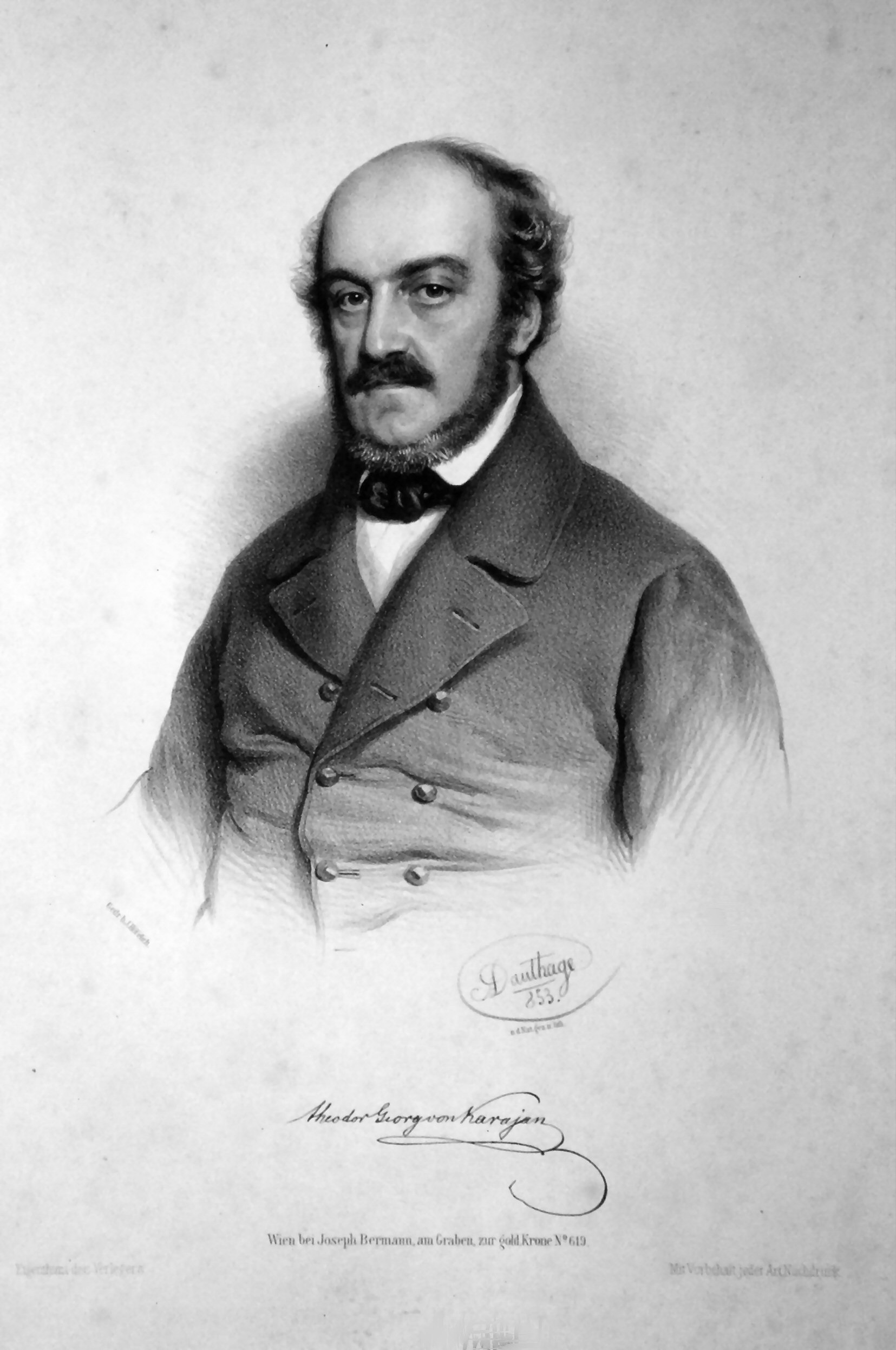
- Lithography of Karajan, 1853
- Born: Theodor Georg Karajan; 22 January 1810; Vienna, Austrian Empire
- Died: 28 April 1873 (aged 63); Vienna, Austria-Hungary
- Resting place: St. Marx Cemetery, Vienna
- Occupations: Germanist; historian; civil servant; politician
- Title: Ritter von Karajan (from 1869)
- Children: Max Theodor von Karajan
- Relatives: Herbert von Karajan (great-grandson); Ernst von Karajan (grandson)
- Awards: Knight of the Order of Leopold (1869)

President of the Imperial Academy of Sciences
- In office 1866–1869

Member of the House of Lords
- In office 1 April 1867 – 28 April 1873

Member of the Frankfurt Parliament
- In office 24 May 1848 – 20 September 1848

Personal details
- Citizenship: Austrian

Academic background
- Education: University of Vienna

Theodor Georg von Karajan, from 1869 Ritter von Karajan (22 January 1810 – 28 April 1873), was an Austrian Germanist, historian, academic and politician. A prominent scholar of medieval German literature and comparative linguistics, he served as president of the Imperial Academy of Sciences in Vienna from 1866 to 1869, was a deputy to the Frankfurt Parliament in 1848, and served as a member of the Austrian House of Lords from 1867 until his death. He was the great-grandfather of the conductor Herbert von Karajan.

== Family and early life ==
Theodor von Karajan was born in Vienna into a family of Greek ancestry, originally surnamed Karagiannis (Greek: Καραγιάννης), from Kozani in Macedonia, then part of the Ottoman province of Rumelia. The family's presence in Kozani is recorded from 1743. Biographical works on his great-grandson, conductor Herbert von Karajan, likewise describe the Karajans as a family of Greek origin and descent. This ancestry was also mentioned in Theodor's biography written by his son, Max Theodor von Karajan. Aromanian ancestry has also been claimed.

His father, Georg Johann von Karajan (1743–1813), was born in Kozani and became a prosperous textile merchant and manufacturer. After training with another Greek merchant in Vienna, he established a spinning mill in Chemnitz, Electorate of Saxony, in 1767. Together with his brothers, particularly Theodor, he developed further textile enterprises and helped establish the city's early manufacturing industry. On 1 June 1792, Georg and his brother Theodor were granted hereditary nobility by Elector Friedrich August III of Saxony, acting as imperial vicar. This ennoblement therefore preceded the birth of Georg's son Theodor Georg in 1810.

Georg moved back to Vienna around 1800. In 1801 he married Theodor's mother, Zoë Domnando (1783–1863), a Greek woman from a family originating in Constantinople which had fled Ottoman persecution and settled in Trieste. Born on 22 January 1810, Theodor was baptized on 30 January according to the Greek Orthodox rite and attended the Greek school maintained by Vienna's Greek community. His father died when he was three. The family's noble status was recognized in Austria on 4 January 1832. His paternal grandparents were Johann Karajan, a merchant in Kozani, and Peristera Stamati. His maternal grandparents were Giovanni Domnando-Politi and Katerina Kyriazoglou, whose Greek family had settled in Trieste.

Theodor was the youngest of Georg and Zoë's six children. His older brother Demeter became a colonel in the Austrian hussars, while their sister Katharina died in 1814.

In Vienna in 1832, Karajan married Juliana Voggenhuber (1808–1889), with whom he had three sons and a daughter. Their son Max Theodor von Karajan became a professor of classical philology at the University of Graz, while another son, Ludwig Maria, served as a physician and medical administrator. Through Max, Theodor was the grandfather of the physician Ernst von Karajan and great-grandfather of the conductor Herbert von Karajan.

== Education and career ==
After attending Vienna's gymnasium from 1820 to 1826, Karajan completed the two-year philosophy course at the University of Vienna from 1826 to 1828. He subsequently entered the Austrian civil service, holding posts successively at the Aulic War Council (Hofkriegsrat), the Court Chamber Archive (Hofkammerarchiv), and the Imperial Court Library (Hofbibliothek).

Through his scholarly work in comparative linguistics and medieval Austrian and German history, Karajan gained widespread academic recognition. Beginning in the 1840s, he was admitted as a member or honorary member of numerous historical and academic societies across Europe. In 1848, he was elected a member of the newly founded Imperial Academy of Sciences in Vienna, later serving as its vice-president from 1851 and as its president from 1866 to 1869.

During the Revolutions of 1848, Karajan was elected as a deputy to the Frankfurt Parliament, representing the Lower Austrian district of Guntersdorf from 24 May to 20 September 1848. In parliament, he aligned with the moderate center-right Casino faction.

In 1850, Karajan was appointed professor to the newly established chair of German Language and Literature at the University of Vienna. However, he resigned the position the following year, protesting the authorities' refusal to approve a Protestant colleague as dean of the faculty on religious grounds.

Karajan was elected a corresponding member of the Prussian Academy of Sciences in 1853 and an external member of the Bavarian Academy of Sciences and Humanities in 1859. He also became a corresponding member of the Göttingen Academy of Sciences and Humanities in 1859, being elevated to honorary membership in 1864. In 1872 was elected as a honorary member of the Hellenic Philological Society of Constantinople.

In 1867, Karajan was appointed a life member of the Austrian House of Lords (Herrenhaus), serving until his death.

== Knighthood and death ==
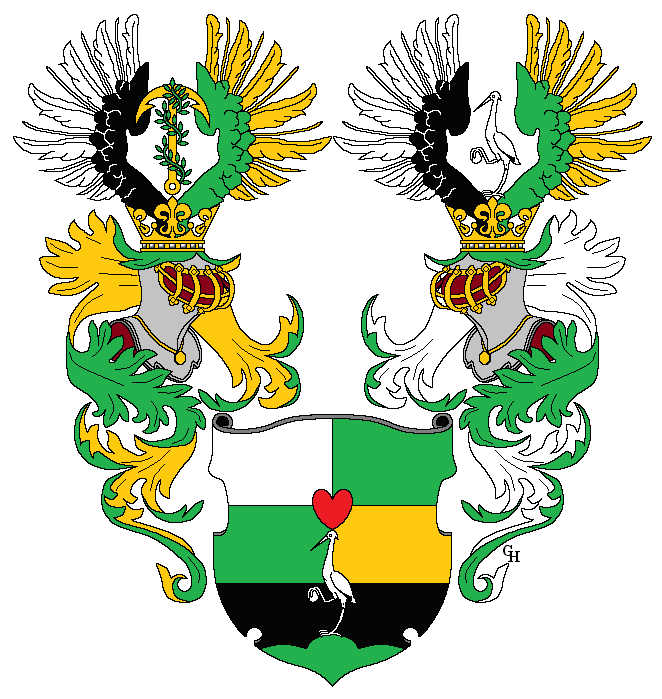
Ritter von Karajan Coat of Arms (1869)

On 27 May 1869, Emperor Franz Joseph I conferred upon him the Knight's Cross of the Order of Leopold. Pursuant to the statutes of the order, he was subsequently elevated to the hereditary Austrian rank of Ritter (knight) in September 1869, adopting the title Ritter von Karajan.

Karajan died on 28 April 1873 at the age of 63, succumbing to pulmonary edema at his residence at Fleischmarkt No. 1 in Vienna's Greek quarter (Griechenviertel), on the site where the Orendihof now stands. He was buried two days later at St. Marx Cemetery (Sankt Marxer Friedhof). An honorary dedicated grave (ehrenhalber gewidmetes Grab) is also maintained in his memory at the Mauer Cemetery (Group 8, Row 1, Number 20) in Vienna.

== Legacy ==
- The Verein für Geschichte der Stadt Wien (Association for the History of the City of Vienna) awards the Theodor-Georg-Ritter-von-Karajan-Medaille in his honour.
- In 1889, the street Karajangasse in Vienna's 20th district, Brigittenau, was named after him.

== Selected publications ==
Karajan published numerous editions of medieval German texts, historical chronicles, and studies on Austrian history:

- Frühlingsgabe für Freunde älterer Litteratur (Vienna: Braumüller, 1839)
- Michael Behaims Buch von den Wienern 1462–65 (Vienna: Hölzl, 1843)
- Deutsche Sprachdenkmale des 12. Jahrhunderts (Vienna: Braumüller und Seidel, 1846)
- Verbrüderungsbuch des Stiftes St. Peter zu Salzburg (Vienna, 1852)
- Über Heinrich den Teichner (Vienna: Hof- und Staatsdruckerei, 1855)
- Kleine Quellen zur Geschichte Österreichs (Vienna, 1855; inaugural volume of the source collection Fontes rerum Austriacarum)
- Die alte Kaiserburg zu Wien vor 1500 (Vienna, 1863)
- Abraham a Sancta Clara (Vienna: Gerold, 1867)
