= Theodor Guschlbauer =

Austrian conductor

Theodor Guschlbauer (born 1939 in Vienna) is an Austrian conductor.

== Decorations and awards ==
- 1995: Austrian Cross of Honour for Science and Art, 1st class
- 1996: Honour "Victoire" for his work on the Opéra du Rhin and at the Strasbourg Philharmonic
- 1997: Knight of the Legion of Honour for his musical activities in France
- Prix d'Honneur at the Fondation Alsace
- Mozart Prize of the Goethe Foundation in Basel
- Grand Prix du Disque for his many recordings in France

Preceded by Kurt Wöss	Principal conductors, Bruckner Orchestra Linz; 1975–1983	Succeeded by Roman Zeilinger
