= Eliette and Herbert von Karajan Institute =

The Eliette and Herbert von Karajan Institute was opened in 2005 by Eliette von Karajan to promote the artistic legacy of her late husband, the conductor, opera director and film maker Herbert von Karajan. The institute is located in Salzburg, the birth place of Herbert von Karajan. Its primary area of operations is the management of the musical legacy and the various brands associated with Herbert von Karajan.

The institute is active in the field of music technology, including the development of new applications for classical music, as well as hosting new event formats such as a series of Classical Music Hack Days as well as the Karajan Music Tech Conference. The institute has partnered with University of Music and Performing Arts Graz, the Mozarteum University of Salzburg, MIT and Harvard University. The institute is led by the German music and technology manager Matthias Röder.
