= Maria Elisabeth Pembaur =

German woman classical pianist

Maria Elisabeth Pembaur (also Pembaur-Elterich, née Elterich (15 April 1869 – 30 January 1937) was a German classical pianist.

Born in Grimma, Elterich studied the piano at the Conservatory of Music Leipzig with Alfred Reisenauer, singing with Marie Hedmondt and music theory with Stephan Krehl. She lived as a pianist in Munich and toured the Netherlands, Switzerland, Denmark, Italy and Spain. In 1906, she married the pianist and composer Josef Pembaur. The two of them also performed together on two pianos.

Elterich died in Munich at the age of 67.
