= Kurt Wöss =

Austrian conductor and musicologist

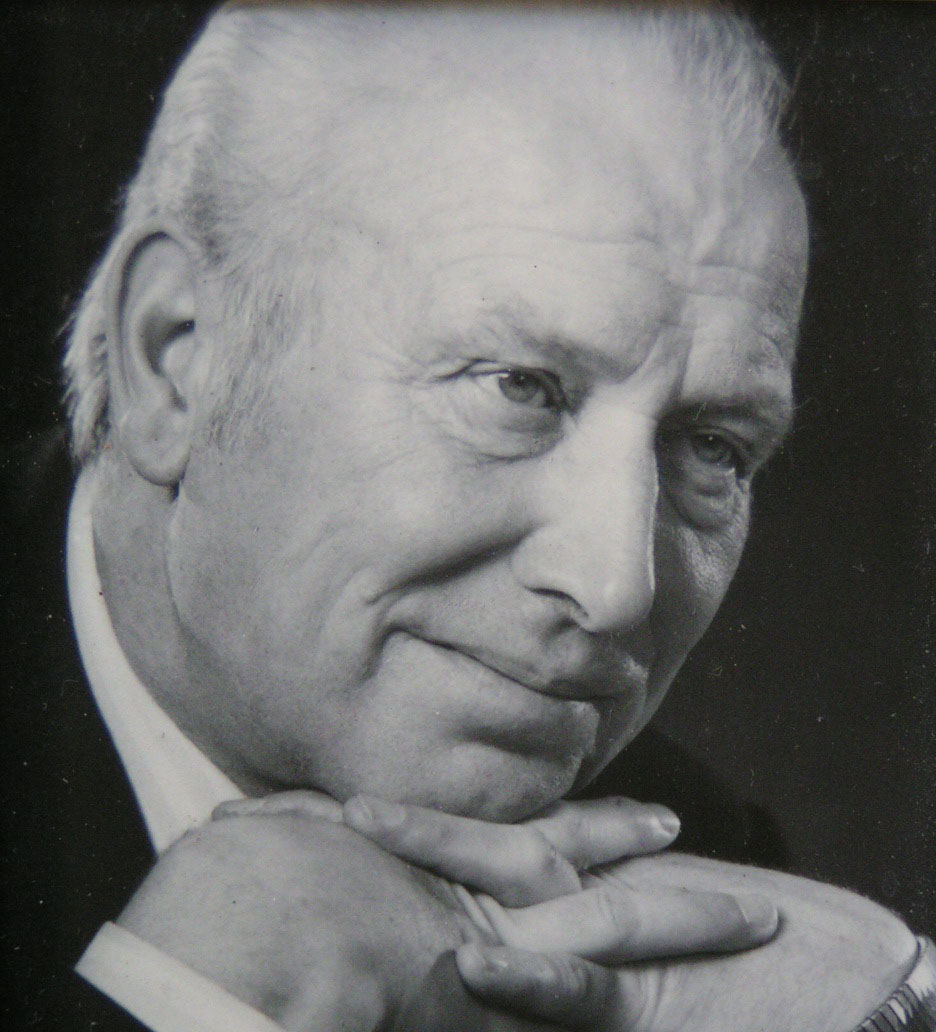
Kurt Woess

Kurt Wöss also Kurt Woess (2 May 1914, in Linz, Austria – 4 December 1987, in Dresden, Germany) was an Austrian conductor and musicologist.

Wöss was principal conductor of the NHK Symphony Orchestra from 1951 to 1954. From 1956 to 1959 he was chief conductor of the Melbourne Symphony Orchestra (then known as the Victorian Symphony Orchestra).

== Decorations and awards ==
- Title of professor
- Austrian Cross of Honour for Science and Art, 1st class
- Anton Bruckner Interpretation Prize
- Gold Decoration of Honour for Services to the Republic of Austria
- Culture Medal of the City of Linz
- Honorary member of the Franz Schmidt community

Preceded by none	Principal Conductors, NHK Symphony Orchestra; 1951–1954	Succeeded by Niklaus Aeschbacher
Preceded by none	Principal conductors, Bruckner Orchestra Linz; 1967–1975	Succeeded by Theodor Guschlbauer
