= Adrian Aeschbacher =

Swiss classical pianist (1912–2002)

Adrian Aeschbacher (10 May 1912 – 9 November 2002) was a Swiss classical pianist.

== Biography ==
Aeschbacher was born on 10 May 1912 in Langenthal, Switzerland. His father was Carl Aeschbacher. His youth was spent at Trogen where his father was professor of piano at the Conservatoire, and his father was his instructor from the age of four to sixteen. His teachers were Emil Frey (at the Zürich Conservatory) and Volkmar Andreae. He then continued his studies for two years intensively with Artur Schnabel in Berlin and began his performing career in 1934. He became famous as an interpreter of Ludwig van Beethoven, Franz Schubert, Robert Schumann and Johannes Brahms. Aeschbacher also performed and left recordings of works by Othmar Schoeck, Arthur Honegger, Heinrich Sutermeister and Walter Lang. He recorded for Decca among other labels.

From 1965 until 1977 he taught at the Hochschule des Saarlandes fur Musik in Saarbrücken.

Aeschbacher's notable students included Anna Renfer and Peter Schmalfuss.

He died on 9 November 2002 in Zürich.
