= NHK Symphony Orchestra =

Japanese broadcast orchestra (founded 1926)

- Orchestra
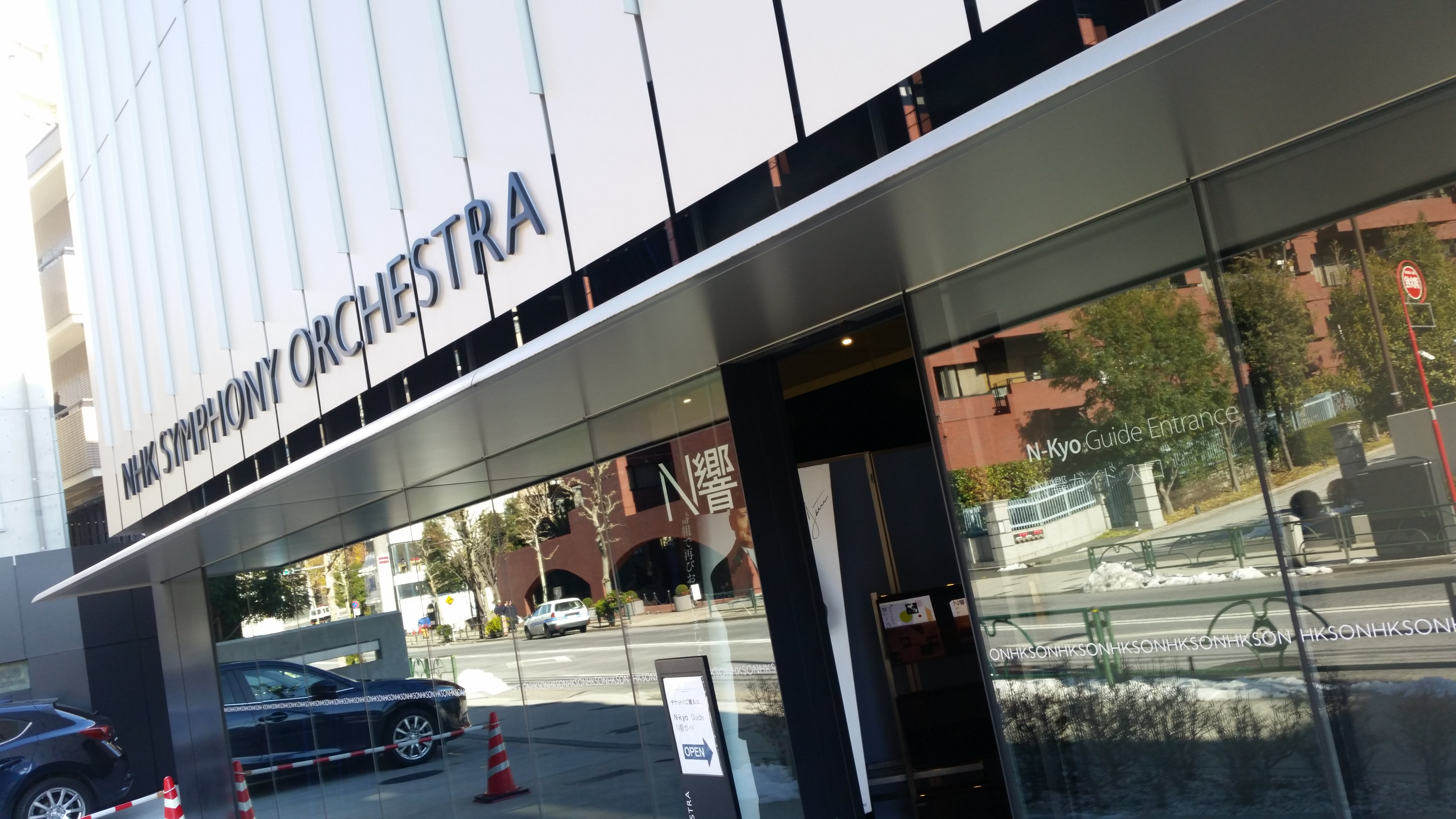
- The headquarters of NHK Symphony Orchestra
- Former name: New Symphony Orchestra (1926); Japan Symphony Orchestra
- Founded: 1926; 100 years ago
- Concert hall: NHK Hall, Suntory Hall
- Principal conductor: Fabio Luisi
- Website: NHK Symphony Orchestra

The NHK Symphony Orchestra (NHK交響楽団, NHK Kōkyō Gakudan) is a Japanese broadcast orchestra based in Tokyo. The orchestra gives concerts in several venues, including the NHK Hall, Suntory Hall, and the Tokyo Opera City Concert Hall.

== History ==
The orchestra was founded as the New Symphony Orchestra (Shin Kōkyō Gakudan; 新交響楽団; kyūjitai: 新交響樂團) on October 5, 1926, by Hidemaro Konoye, and was the country's first professional symphony orchestra. In 1942, its name was changed to the Japan Symphony Orchestra (日本交響楽団). In 1951, after receiving financial support from NHK, the orchestra took its current name.

The most recent conductor with the title of music director of the orchestra was Vladimir Ashkenazy, from 2004 to 2007. Ashkenazy now has the title of conductor laureate. Charles Dutoit, the orchestra's music director from 1998 to 2003, is now its music director emeritus. Wolfgang Sawallisch, honorary conductor from 1967 to 1994, held the title of honorary conductor laureate until his death. The orchestra's current permanent conductors are Yuzo Toyama, since 1979, and Tadaaki Otaka, since 2010. Herbert Blomstedt holds the title of honorary conductor, since 1986 and the title of honorary conductor laureate, since 2016. André Previn had the title of honorary guest conductor from 2012 until his death in 2019.

In June 2012, the orchestra named Paavo Järvi as its chief conductor, as of the 2015–2016 season, with an initial contract of 3 years. In November 2019, the orchestra announced an extension to Järvi's contract through August 2022. Järvi stood down as the orchestra's chief conductor in August 2022.

Fabio Luisi first guest-conducted the orchestra in July 2001. In April 2021, the orchestra announced the appointment of Luisi as its next chief conductor, effective September 2022, with an initial contract of 3 years. In August 2023, the orchestra announced the extension of his contract as its chief conductor through August 2028. In April 2026, the orchestra announced that Luisi is to stand down as its chief conductor at the close of August 2028, and to take the title of honorary conductor laureate in September 2028.

In October 2008, Tugan Sokhiev first guest-conducted the NHK SO. In October 2026, the orchestra announced the appointment of Sokhiev as its next music director, effective in September 2028.

== Permanent Conductors and Music Directors ==
- Hidemaro Konoye (January 1926 – February 1935)
- Josef König (April 1927 – April 1929)
- Nicolai Schifferblatt (July 1929 – July 1936)
- Joseph Rosenstock (August 1936 – September 1946, full-time conductor; March 1956 – March 1957, principal conductor)
- Hisatada Otaka (April 1942 – February 1951†, full-time conductor)
- Kazuo Yamada (April 1942 – July 1951, full-time conductor)
- Shin'ichi Takata (April 1944 – May 1951, full-time conductor)
- Kurt Wöss (September 1951 – August 1954, principal conductor)
- Niklaus Aeschbacher (August 1954 – March 1956, principal conductor)
- Wilhelm Loibner (March 1957 – February 1959, principal conductor)
- Wilhelm Schüchter (February 1959 – March 1962, principal conductor)
- Alexander Rumpf (August 1964 – July 1965, principal conductor)
- Hiroyuki Iwaki (February 1969 – June 2006†, permanent conductor)
- Tadashi Mori (February 1979 – May 1987†, permanent conductor)
- Yuzo Toyama (February 1979–2023, permanent conductor)
- Hiroshi Wakasugi (April 1995 – July 2009†, permanent conductor)
- Charles Dutoit (September 1996 – August 1998, principal conductor; September 1998 – August 2003, music director)
- Vladimir Ashkenazy (September 2004 – August 2007, music director)
- Tadaaki Otaka, CBE (January 2010 – present, permanent conductor)
- Paavo Järvi, (October 2016 – August 2022, chief conductor)
- Fabio Luisi, (September 2022 – present, chief conductor)
- Tatsuya Shimono (October 2023 – present, permanent conductor)
- Tugan Sokhiev (music director-designate, effective September 2028)

== Honorary conductors and other titled conductors ==
- Joseph Rosenstock (August 1951 – October 1985†)
- Joseph Keilberth (January 1967 – July 1968†)
- Lovro von Matačić (January 1967 – January 1985†)
- Wolfgang Sawallisch (January 1967 – October 1994; November 1994 – February 2013†, Honorary Conductor Laureate)
- Otmar Suitner (January 1973 – January 2010†)
- Horst Stein (March 1975 – July 2008†)
- Herbert Blomstedt (January 1986 – November 2026†)
- Charles Dutoit (September 2003 – present, music director emeritus)
- Vladimir Ashkenazy (September 2007 – present, conductor laureate)
- André Previn (September 2012 – February 2019†, honorary guest conductor)

== See also ==
- Radio orchestra
- List of radio orchestras
