= Carl Aeschbacher =

Swiss composer

Carl Aeschbacher (31 March 1886 in Bümpliz, Bern – 29 January 1944 in Zürich), sometimes also spelled "Äschbacher", was a Swiss choir leader and composer. His son Adrian Aeschbacher had some success as a classical pianist, and his other son, Niklaus Aeschbacher, became a conductor.
