= Josef Pembaur =

Austrian classical pianist and composer

Josef Pembaur (20 April 1875 – 12 October 1950) was an Austrian pianist and composer.

== Life ==
Born in Innsbruck, Pembaur was the son of the composer and music director Josef Pembaur the Elder (1848–1923). He got his first musical education by his father. From 1893 until 1896, he studied piano at the Hochschule für Musik und Theater München with Ludwig Thuille, conducting with Ludwig Abel and composition and organ with Josef Gabriel Rheinberger. He was awarded a gold medal at the final examination in 1896. From 1896 to 1901, he worked as a piano teacher at the same school.

In 1901/02, he continued his studies with Alfred Reisenauer at the University of Music and Theatre Leipzig, where he was employed as a teacher for higher piano playing. In 1912, he was appointed professor of music in Saxony. In 1921, he was appointed professor in Bavaria, but he returned to the Academy of Music in Munich and taught a master class for piano. His students included Anna Renfer.

Pembaur also completed numerous concert tours. In Berlin he was one of the judges in the competition for the Ibach Prize.

In Spring 1919, Pembaur submitted eight piano pieces for the Reproduktionsklavier Welte-Mignon, including two compositions by his father, probably his earliest recordings.

On 29 October 1918, Thomas Mann heard him in an event with Joachim von Delbrück, who was reading from his novel Der sterbende Chopin that evening. Mann commented on this in his diary as follows: "I listened to the music, especially the sonata with the Funeral march, which P. played excellently, with intimate pleasure. In between, this donkey from Delbrück was beating his straw. We left before the last section."

In 1906, he married the pianist Maria Elterich, and the two of them also performed together on two pianos.

Pembaur's brother Karl was a composer and choirmaster in Dresden.

Pembaur died in Munich at the age of 75.

== Compositions ==
- Chamber music
- Piano pieces
- Choirs
- Lieder

== Publications ==
- Von der Poesie des Klavierspiels. Munich: Wunderhorn-Verlag 1911 (in 1998, a reprint of the 5th edition from 1919 was reissued. ISBN 3-929379-03-1)
- Ludwig van Beethovens Sonaten: op. 31 No 2 und op. 57. Munich: Wunderhorn-Verlag 1915

== Recordings ==
- Phonola piano rolls of the Ludwig Hupfeld AG Cie, Leipzig
- Welte-Mignon piano rolls of the M. Welte & Söhne Cie, Freiburg
- Disk for Carl Lindström AG (recorded in Berlin, November 1927)
  - Frédéric Chopin:
    - Prélude Nr. 15 Des-Dur "Regentropfen", op. 28
  - Franz Liszt:
    - Mephisto-Walzer Nr. 1
    - Waldesrauschen
    - Konzert für Klavier und Orchester Nr. 2 A-Dur. accompanied by members of the Staatskapelle Berlin conducted by Frieder Weissmann
- Schallplatten für Klankopname Studio's van Wouw, Amsterdam (1938 recording)
  - Frédéric Chopin:
    - Ballade Nr. 3 A flat major, op. 47
- Radio recordings
  - Franz Liszt:
    - Konzert für Klavier und Orchester Nr. 2 A-Dur. Es begleitet das Royal Concertgebouw Orchestra conducted by Eduard van Beinum (recorded 8 September 1935)
