= Niklaus Aeschbacher =

Swiss composer and conductor

Niklaus Aeschbacher (30 April 1917 – 30 November 1995) was a Swiss composer and conductor.

Born in Trogen in the canton of Appenzell Ausserrhoden as the son of Carl Aeschbacher, he studied music in Zürich and Berlin. After a post as conductor in Bern he became the chief conductor of the NHK Symphony Orchestra in Tokyo in 1954, but returned to Bern two years later. In 1964, he accepted a post in Detmold, where he taught at the music academy from 1972 to 1982.

Between 1930 and 1950, he wrote one opera, Die roten Schuhe, for the Swiss radio station DRS and a few pieces for orchestra, but also some chamber music.

== Sources ==
- Biographical note at Zentralbibliothek Zürich (in German)
- Ingrid Bigler-Marschall (2005). "Niklaus Aeschbacher". In Andreas Kotte (ed.). Theaterlexikon der Schweiz / Dictionnaire du théâtre en Suisse / Dizionario Teatrale Svizzero / Lexicon da teater svizzer [Theater Dictionary of Switzerland] (in German). Vol. 1. Zürich: Chronos. p. 30. ISBN 978-3-0340-0715-3. LCCN 2007423414. OCLC 62309181.

Preceded by Kurt Wöss	Principal Conductors, NHK Symphony Orchestra; 1954–1956	Succeeded by Joseph Rosenstock
