= Max Peiffer Watenphul =

German painter

- Born: 01 September 1896
- Died: 13 July 1976 (79 years)
- Style: Mediterranean, Still Life

Max Peiffer Watenphul (01 September 1896 – 13 July 1976) was a German artist. Described as a "lyric poet of painting", he belongs to a "tradition of German painters for whom the Italian landscape represented Arcadia." In addition to Mediterranean scenes, he regularly depicted Salzburg and painted many still lifes of flowers. As well as oil paintings, his extensive body of work encompasses watercolours, drawings, enamel, textiles, graphic art, and photographs.

== Life and work ==
=== Childhood, youth and student years ===
Max Peiffer Watenphul was the son of Karl Josef Emil Peiffer, a dispensing chemist, and his wife Anna. His father died in 1903. Three years later, in 1906, his mother married Dr. Heinrich Watenphul, a master at the grammar school in Quedlinburg. His family lived there until 1911 before moving to Hattingen, a town on the River Ruhr, where Max's stepfather, who also wrote books on Middle Latin poetry, had been appointed headmaster of the local grammar school. It was also the school now attended by Max Peiffer. His half-sister Grace was born in 1913. Max Peiffer passed his Abitur in 1914. In compliance with his parents’ wishes, Max began to study medicine in Bonn, but then soon enrolled at the law faculty and studied law in Strasbourg, Frankfurt/Main and Munich. It was in Munich, in Goltz's bookshop, that he first set eyes on the works of Paul Klee; he was later to meet Klee in person. He obtained his doctorate in Würzburg in 1918 with a thesis on church law and then took his trainee barrister's examination. There then followed several months’ military training at an army barracks in Mülheim/Ruhr. In 1919 he became a trainee barrister at the district court in Hattingen and, in that same year, adopted the double surname of Peiffer Watenphul. By the autumn of that year he had decided to become a painter and gave up his legal career.

=== Travels and friendships ===
Landscape, 1920 Oil on canvas, 48 x 54 cm Sprengel Museum Hannover

Slit Tapestry, 1922 Hemp (warp) and wool (woof), 137 x 76 cm Bauhaus-Archiv, Museum für Gestaltung, Berlin

In 1919 Max Peiffer Watenphul enrolled as a student at the Bauhaus in Weimar. Walter Gropius gave him permission to sit in on all workshop classes. He was given his own studio and attended Johannes Itten’s famous introductory course. It was around this time that he befriended Oskar Schlemmer, Wassily Kandinsky, Gerhard Marcks, Josef Albers, Paul Klee, Kurt Schwitters and Else Lasker-Schüler. Peiffer Watenphul resided in Weimar until the end of 1923. From 1920 he was a member of the “Junges Rheinland” group of artists in Düsseldorf, making friends with Otto Dix (who painted his portrait), Werner Gilles, Otto Pankok and Max Ernst. The art dealer Alfred Flechtheim placed Max Peiffer Watenphul under contract with his gallery, thus largely ensuring the young artist's financial independence. In 1920 he was able to travel, for the very first time, to Salzburg and Vienna, and in 1921 he had his first exhibition, arranged by Ernst Gosebruch, at the Municipal Art Museum in Essen. His first trip to Italy followed in November 1921, taking him via Rome and Naples to Positano. In 1922 he worked in the enamelling workshop of his former fellow Bauhaus student Maria Cyrenius in Salzburg. While in Essen he made the acquaintance of Alexei Jawlensky. On 1 July 1924, Peiffer Watenphul travelled on a cargo ship via Cuba to Mexico, where he stayed for almost a whole year. During 1925 he visited Jawlensky several times in Wiesbaden, where he exhibited his works at the art museum. There then followed a trip to Ragusa, Dalmatia, with Maria Cyrenius and a trip to the South of France, Paris, Florence and Rome. From 1927 until 1931 he worked as a teacher of "general artistic design" at the Folkwang School in Essen, where Max Burchartz and Grete Willers, who had been students together with Peiffer Watenphul at the Bauhaus in Weimar, were also teachers. Stays in Berlin and trips to Paris (where he met Karli Sohn-Rethel and Florence Henri) followed, as well as travels to the South of France and Morocco together with the collector Klaus Gebhard. Peiffer Watenphul's interest in photography, which had begun during his Bauhaus years, was developed in greater depth at the Folkwang School. In 1931 he terminated his teaching post there and, in that same year, was awarded the Rome Prize.

=== Italy ===
Max Peiffer Watenphul spent the period from October 1931 to July 1932 in Rome at the German Academy in the Villa Massimo, where other artists residing there at the time included Uli Nimptsch, Ernst Wilhelm Nay, Karl Rössing and Fritz Rhein. He also made friends with Ludwig Curtius, Bernhard Degenhart and Eckert Peterich. In July 1932 he visited Gaeta together with his sister Grace and Erika and Klaus Rössing. In 1933 he received the “Additional Award” of the Carnegie Institute, Pittsburgh, for a floral still-life. Travelling to Italy again in 1936, he visited Rome, Latina, Sorrento, Capri, Ischia and Sicily. By 1937 the situation in Germany was becoming more and more oppressive. His correspondence was intercepted and his paintings were confiscated from German museums: Nationalgalerie Berlin, Folkwang Museum Essen, Städtische Kunstsammlung Kassel, Städtische Kunsthalle Mannheim. The floral still-life, which had won him the Carnegie Award and had meanwhile been hanging in the Nationalgalerie Berlin, was shown in the Nazis' notorious "Degenerate Art" exhibition in Munich in 1937. In the autumn of that same year, Max Peiffer Watenphul finally decided to move to Italy for good, to which end he was greatly helped by his half-sister Grace, who was married to the Roman architect Enrico Pasqualucci. It was also in that year that the artist's parents moved to Essen, his stepfather having been prematurely retired from his post as headmaster for political reasons. In December 1937, Max Peiffer Watenphul travelled to the island of Ischia, where he met several German painters and intellectuals, including Werner Gilles, Rudolf Levy, Eduard Bargheer and the composer Gottfried von Einem. Heinrich Watenphul, Max's stepfather, died in 1940. By 1941, Max was in such financial straits that he was obliged to return to Germany and take up a teaching post – obtained for him by Georg Muche – at the Krefeld School of Textile Design as the successor to Johannes Itten. He took over the drawing and painting class. Frequent visits were paid to Oskar Schlemmer in Wuppertal. In 1943, Peiffer Watenphul's studio was destroyed in an air raid. The summer of that same year was spent in Vienna, whereupon he taught at the Arts and Crafts School in Salzburg until the winter of 1946. Max Peiffer Watenphul was to exercise an enormous influence on the young painters of Salzburg. As a German national, Peiffer Watenphul was refused permission to reside in Austria after 1946 and so he fled across South Tyrol to his half-sister in Venice, where he then lived for the next twelve years. He made friends with the painters Filippo De Pisis and Felice Carena and with the collector Peggy Guggenheim. His first solo exhibition since the end of the war took place in Venice in 1948. His first post-war travels to the south of Italy – to Rome, Naples, Caserta, Positano and Capri – were made in 1949. It was in Positano that he met up again with Karli Sohn-Rethel and Stefan Andres.

=== Recognition regained ===
Max Peiffer Watenphul spent the whole month of April 1950 in Florence. In the same year Eberhard Hanfstaengl obtained an exhibition room for him at the Biennale, where his Venice paintings were shown. In autumn 1951 Peiffer Watenphul was granted a passport, enabling him to travel to Salzburg. The City of Salzburg placed a studio at his disposal in the Salzburger Künstlerhaus, which he kept until 1971. He met up again with Max Ernst and Jean Arp in Venice. Emilio Vedova, Giuseppe Santomaso, Carlo Cardazzo and the critic Bruno Alfieri counted among his many friends. Jean Cocteau wrote a foreword for his exhibitions. It was not until January 1952 that Peiffer Watenphul made his first visit to Germany since the end of the war: Essen, Dortmund, Wuppertal, Braunschweig, Munich were the cities on his itinerary before travelling on to Zürich. From 1952 onwards he took part regularly in the Grand Art Exhibitions at the Haus der Kunst in Munich and was for a long time a member of the Munich Secession. Encouraged by the Zürich gallery owner Chichio Haller (née Trillhaase), he produced his first colour lithographs. In 1952 he exhibited at the Folkwang Museum in Essen, the Museum am Ostwall in Dortmund and the Städtisches Museum in Wuppertal. On a visit to Paris in the spring of 1953 he was able to see many old friends again, including Daniel-Henry Kahnweiler and Florence Henri. From 1954 he spent the spring and autumn months on the island of Ischia and the summer months in Salzburg, where, in 1956, he had a large and important exhibition at the Salzburg Residence. This was followed in 1957 by an exhibition on the premises of the Stuttgart Art Society showing 60 oil paintings, 40 watercolours and a large number of prints and drawings. In the autumn of 1957 Max Peiffer Watenphul bought a small studio in Rome, not far from the Piazza di Spagna. From his terrace he had an unobstructed view of the Pincio. In 1958/59 he took part in an exhibition at the Palazzo delle Esposizioni entitled Arte tedesca dal 1905 ad oggi. A comprehensive retrospective at the Municipal Art Museum of Leverkusen included both his early works and his Venice paintings.

=== Rome ===
Max Peiffer Watenphul took up permanent residence in Rome in 1958. During the 1960s he travelled to the south of Italy on many occasions. He made friends in Rome with the German correspondents Josef Schmitz van Vorst, Gustav René Hocke and Erich Kusch. In 1960 spent a month in Lebanon and, in 1961, visited Greece for the very first time. An exhibition mounted at the Kunsthalle in Kiel in 1961 emphasized the importance of his Venice and Rome paintings. Anna Peiffer, the artist's mother, died in Rome in February 1963. From 1964 Max Peiffer Watenphul travelled to the island of Corfu every year, where he usually rented a small apartment for the period from April to June. In 1964 he succeeded Kokoschka at the International Summer Academy in Salzburg and taught there for three months every year. In that same year he was awarded the Ring of Honour of the City of Salzburg. In 1965 he was appointed a full member of the Bavarian Academy of Fine Arts in Munich and, in the same year, exhibited his works from 1921 to 1964 at the Galleria La Medusa in Rome. His 70th birthday in 1966 was marked by exhibitions at the Otto Stangl Gallery in Munich and the Friedrich Welz Gallery in Salzburg. In November 1969 he was awarded the Great Cross of Merit of the Federal Republic of Germany. His last painting was done in 1970; after that he produced only drawings, watercolours and lithographs. A retrospective took place at the Kunsthalle in Darmstadt in 1972, with 90 oil paintings and 60 watercolours.

== Honours and distinctions ==
- Rome Prize
- “Additional Award” of the University of Pittsburgh, 1933
- Ring of Honour of the City of Salzburg, 1964
- Member of the Bavarian Academy of Fine Arts, Munich, since 1965
- Great Cross of Merit of the Federal Republic of Germany, 1969

== Exhibitions (selection) ==
- 1921: Municipal Art Museum, Essen
- 1925: Museum Wiesbaden
- 1933: Pittsburgh, Thirty-First Annual International Exhibition of Paintings, Carnegie Institute
- 1948: Venice, XXIVth Biennale
- 1950: Venice, XXVth Biennale
- 1952: Essen, Max Peiffer Watenphul, Museum Folkwang
- 1956: Salzburg Residence, Salzburg
- 1957: Stuttgart Art Society
- 1959: Retrospective, Municipal Museum, Leverkusen
- 1961: Kunsthalle Kiel
- 1965: Galleria La Medusa, Rome
- 1972: Retrospective, Kunsthalle Darmstadt
- 1976: Bavarian Academy of Fine Arts, Munich
- 1991: Wuppertal, Max Peiffer Watenphul. Paintings, Von der Heydt-Museum
- 1995: Milan, Rifugio precario. Artisti e intellettuali tedeschi in Italia 1933–1945, Palazzo della Ragione; Berlin, Academy of Arts
- 1996-1997: Rome, Max Peiffer Watenphul, German Academy Villa Massimo; Hanover, Sprengel Museum; Venice, German-Italian Cultural Society, Palazzo Albrizzi
- 1999: Berlin, Max Peiffer Watenphul, A Painter Photographs Italy, Bauhaus-Archive[2]
- 2000: Rome, Max Peiffer Watenphul e l'Italia, Museo Nazionale di Castel Sant'Angelo[3]
- 2001: Salzburg, Max Peiffer Watenphul, Still Lifes and Photographs, Rupertinum
- 2004: Salzburg. Max Peiffer Watenphul, Salzburg, Paintings of a City, Municipal Gallery of Salzburg
- 2005: Essen, Max Peiffer Watenphul – The Industrial Picture, Museum Folkwang
- 2007: Munich, Max Peiffer Watenphul – Drawings, Pinakothek der Moderne, Staatliche Graphische Sammlung

== Bibliography ==
- Nikolaus Schaffer/Anton Gugg: Max Peiffer Watenphul – Salzburg, Bilder einer Stadt. Mit persönlichen Erinnerungen von Alessandra Pasqualucci. Published by Verlag Galerie Welz, Salzburg 2004
- Grace Watenphul Pasqualucci/Alessandra Pasqualucci: Max Peiffer Watenphul – Werkverzeichnis. Band I: Gemälde, Aquarelle. Mit einem Geleitwort von Bernhard Degenhart. Published by DuMont Buchverlag, Cologne 1989
- Grace Watenphul Pasqualucci/Alessandra Pasqualucci: Max Peiffer Watenphul – Werkverzeichnis. Band II: Zeichnungen, Emailarbeiten, Textilien, Druckgraphik, Photographie. Mit einem Geleitwort von Sabine Fehlemann. Published by DuMont Buchverlag, Cologne 1993
- Bert Bilzer: Peiffer Watenphul. Göttingen 1974
- Gustav René Hocke: Max Peiffer Watenphul – Persönlichkeit, Leben, Werk, Stuttgart 1976
- Brigitt Frielinghaus: Max Peiffer Watenphul 1896-1976. Gemälde und Aquarelle aus dem Städtischen Museum, Arbeitsberichte, Veröffentlichungen aus dem Städtischen Museum Braunschweig. Band 63. Braunschweig 1993
