= Mollans-sur-Ouvèze =

- Commune
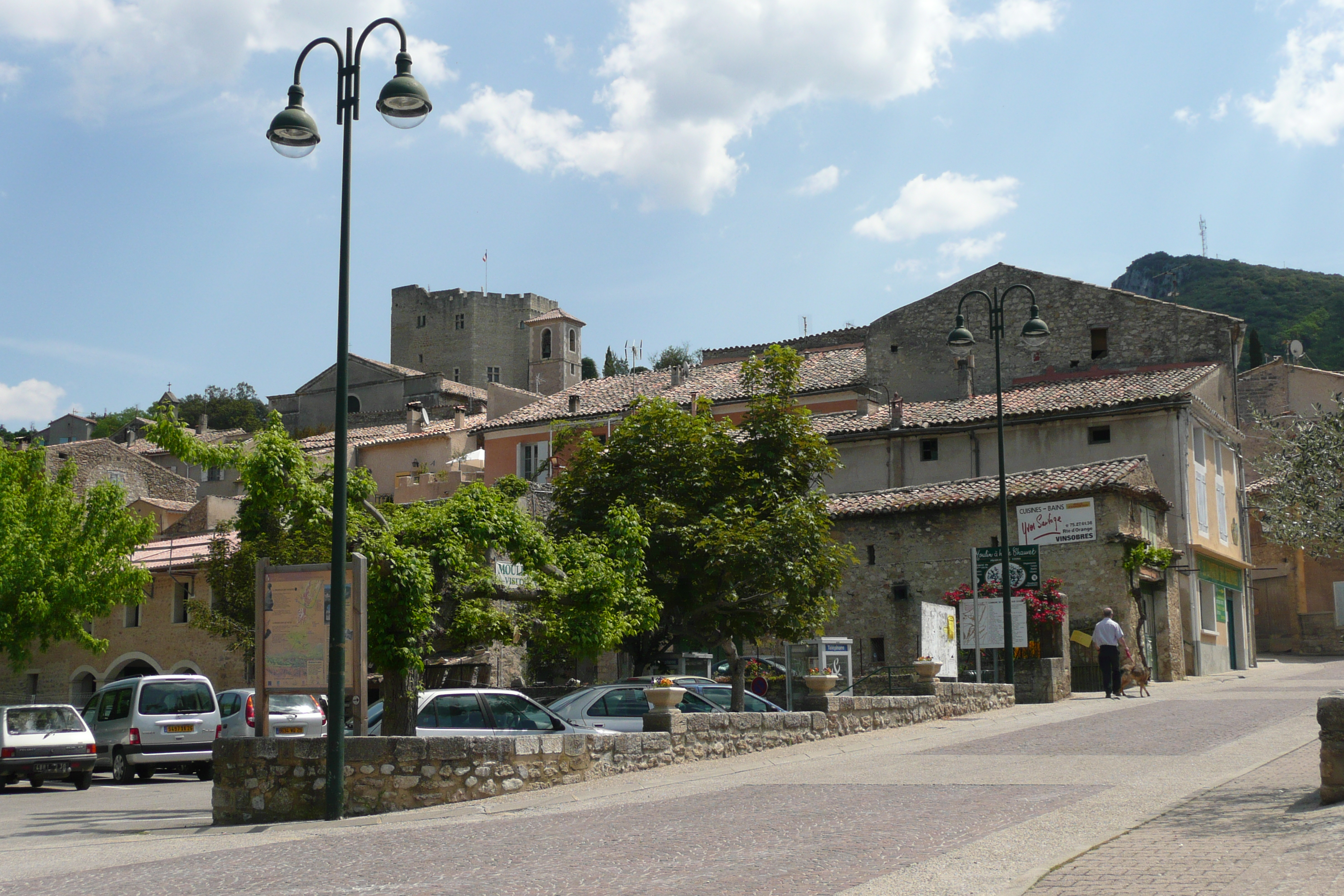
- Upper fortress over the centre of Mollans

- Coat of arms
- Location of Mollans-sur-Ouvèze
- Location within France Location within Auvergne-Rhône-Alpes
- Coordinates: 44°14′14″N 5°11′29″E
- Country: France
- Region: Auvergne-Rhône-Alpes
- Department: Drôme
- Arrondissement: Nyons
- Canton: Nyons et Baronnies

Government
  - Mayor (2020–2026): Frédéric Roux
- Area^{1}: 19.96 km^{2} (7.71 sq mi)
- Highest elevation: 1,007 m (3,304 ft)
- Lowest elevation: 252 m (827 ft)
- Population (2023): 1,043
  - Density: 52.25/km^{2} (135.3/sq mi)
- Time zone: UTC+01:00 (CET)
  - Summer (DST): UTC+02:00 (CEST)
- INSEE/Postal code: 26188 /26170
- ^{1} French Land Register data, which excludes lakes, ponds, glaciers > 1 km^{2} (0.386 sq mi or 247 acres) and river estuaries.

Mollans-sur-Ouvèze (French pronunciation: [mɔlɑ̃ syʁ‿uvɛz]; Vivaro-Alpine: Molan) is a commune in the Drôme department in southeastern France.

== Population ==
Historical population
Year	Pop.	±% p.a.
1968	615	—
1975	615	+0.00%
1982	690	+1.66%
1990	782	+1.58%
1999	840	+0.80%
2007	996	+2.15%
2012	1,066	+1.37%
2017	1,061	−0.09%
2023	1,043	−0.28%
Source: INSEE

== See also ==
- Communes of the Drôme department
