= Hammer (disambiguation) =

A hammer is a type of tool.

Hammer or HAMMER may also refer to:

== Entertainment ==
=== Film and television ===
- Hammer Film Productions, also known as Hammer Films, a British film and television production company based in London, UK
- Hammer (1972 film), a 1972 action film starring Fred Williamson
- Hammer (2019 film), a 2019 crime thriller film directed by Christian Sparkes
- The Hammer (2007 film), a comedy starring Adam Carolla
- The Hammer (2010 film), a biopic about deaf wrestler and mixed martial artist Matt Hamill
- "The Hammer" (Justified), a 2010 episode of the TV series Justified
- "The Hammer", an episode of Canadian podcast Someone Knows Something

=== Music ===
==== Albums ====
- Hammer (album), by Afrob, 2005
- Hammer, by Claw Boys Claw, 2013

==== Songs ====
- "Hammer" (Bob Marley song)
- "Hammer" (Lorde song), 2025
- "Hammer", by Nothing,Nowhere, 2018
- "The Hammer", by David Rudder, 1986
- "The Hammer", by Motorhead from Ace of Spades, 1980
- "The Hammer", by Ray Boltz, 1994
- "The Hammer", by !!! from Strange Weather, Isn't It?, 2010

==== Other uses in music ====
- Hammer Records, a London-based record label in the late 1970s
- "Mahler hammer", hammer used as percussion instrument in Mahler's 6th Symphony in A minor
- Hammer-on, a guitar playing technique

=== Fictional characters ===
- Hammer (comics), Marvel Comics characters
- Hammer (DC Comics), DC Comics characters
- Mike Hammer (character), a private detective created by Mickey Spillane
- Justin Hammer, Marvel Comics supervillain
- Sasha Hammer, a Marvel Comics enemy of Iron Man
- Police Inspector Sledge Hammer, of the TV show of the same name
- Colonel Alois Hammer, a mercenary in David Drake's Hammerverse
- Hans von Hammer, a World War I fighter ace in Enemy Ace, a DC Comics property
- Sgt. Hammer, the siege tank operator, a playable character in Heroes of the Storm
- Alter ego of the Crimson Cowl, a Marvel Comics villain
- Half of the Marvel Comics supervillain team Hammer and Anvil

=== Other uses in entertainment ===
- H.A.M.M.E.R., a fictional espionage and law enforcement agency in the Marvel Comics Universe

== Military and firearms ==
- FOB Hammer, a now-closed U.S. military forward operating base in Iraq
- Hammer (firearms), a gun part used to fire the projectile
- Highly Agile Modular Munition Extended Range (HAMMER), also known as Armement Air-Sol Modulaire (AASM), a French kit for upgrading dumb bombs to rocket-powered smart bombs
- Operation Hammer (disambiguation), several military (and one police) operations
- War hammer, a medieval weapon

== People ==
- Hammer (surname), a list of people with the surname
- Hammer (nickname), a list of people
- Hammer DeRoburt (1922–1992), the founding President of the Republic of Nauru
- Joe DeCamara (born 1978), American sports radio host nicknamed "the Hammer"
- MC Hammer (born 1962), American rapper and actor
- Van Hammer (born 1967), ring name of an American former professional wrestler
- William Hinds (1887–1957), stage name Will Hammer, co-founder of Hammer Films
- Dave Schultz (ice hockey) (born 1949), Canadian former ice hockey player nicknamed "the Hammer"
- The Hammer (radio personality), Canadian radio personality

== Places ==
=== Germany ===
- Hammer an der Uecker, in Uecker-Randow
- A locality in Wipperfürth
- A locality in Liebenwalde
- A locality in Simmerath
- A locality in Fischbachau
- An administrative area in Feldkirchen-Westerham
- A former name of Herchen-Bahnhof, a locality in Windeck

=== Elsewhere ===
- Hammer, West Sussex, England
- Hammer, South Dakota, US
- Hammer Creek, Pennsylvania, US
- Hammer Dome
- Hammer Lake, Ontario, Canada
- Hammer Point, Robert Island, Antarctica
- Hammer Township, Yellow Medicine County, Minnesota
- The Hammer, nickname of Hamilton, Ontario, the 10th largest city in Canada
- The former German name of a Prussian village that is now Bogucin, Poland
- Hammer Municipality (later spelled Hamre), a former municipality in the old Hordaland county, Norway

== Sports ==
- Hammer throw, an athletic event
- The last stone advantage in curling
- PFC Minyor Pernik, a Bulgarian football team known as The Hammers
- West Ham United F.C., an English football team known as The Hammers
- West Ham Hammers, a defunct English motorcycle speedway team
- Lakeside Hammers, an English speedway team
- Hamilton Hammers, a Canadian hockey team
- Hammer SpVg, a German association football club
- Alabama Hammers, a Professional Indoor Football League team
- Huntington Hammer, an Ultimate Indoor Football League team based in Huntington, West Virginia

== Technology ==
- HAMMER (file system), in DragonFly BSD
- Hammer (telecommunication), test system by Empirix
- A development phase of the Athlon 64 microprocessor
- A development phase of the Glaze3D graphic card series
- Hammer Editor, a 3D level editor for Source, Source 2 and GoldSrc maps
- Heat-assisted magnetic recording (acronym "HAMR")
- Hammer, to subject a system to a brute-force attack

== Other ==
- Hammer (American automobile), built in Detroit, Michigan, by the Hammer Motor Company from 1905 to 1906
- Hammer (Australian automobile), a cyclecar built in Mount Torrens, South Australia by Bruno Hammer
- Hammer (candlestick pattern), a formation in stock market analysis
- HAMMER (spacecraft), a NASA-proposed nuclear spacecraft
- Hammer Bowling, an American bowling equipment manufacturer
- Hammer Museum or Armand Hammer Museum of Art and Culture Center at UCLA, Los Angeles, California
- Hammer pants, baggy pants named after MC Hammer
- Hammer projection, an equal area map projection
- Hammer Stradivarius, a 1707 antique violin
- MV Hammer, a Singaporean tanker
- A late-1980s Mercedes-Benz car tuned by AMG, nicknamed "Hammer"
- Malleus, a bone in the middle ear

== See also ==
- Jackhammer (disambiguation)
- Charles Martel (c. 688–741), Frankish king - Martel is French for "the hammer"
- Judas Maccabeus, leader of the Maccabean revolt (167–160 BCE) against the Seleucid Empire - Maccabee may derive from the Aramaic word for "hammer"
- Edward I of England (1239–1307), King of England, "Hammer of the Scots"
- Hamar (disambiguation)
- Hummer (disambiguation)
- Hamm (disambiguation)
