= Hammer (surname) =

Hammer is a surname. Notable people with the surname include:

- A. J. Hammer (born 1966), American television and radio personality
- Angela Hutchinson Hammer (1870–1952), American newspaper publisher
- Anna M. Hammer (1840–1910), American philanthropist and temperance movement leader
- Anthony Hammer, Australian actor
- Armand Hammer (1898–1990), U.S. physician, entrepreneur, oil magnate and art collector
- Armie Hammer (born 1986), American actor
- Barbara Hammer (1939–2019), American film maker
- Beatrice Hammer (born 1963), French writer
- Bernhard Hammer (1822–1907), Swiss president
- Bob Hammer (1930–2021), American jazz pianist, composer and arranger
- Caleb Hammer (born 1995), American YouTuber
- Caroline Hammer (1832–1915), Danish photographer
- Cec Hammer (1926–2013), Australian rules footballer
- Charles Christian Hammer (1952–2004), American classical guitarist
- Christina Hammer (born 1990), German boxer
- Chuck Hammer, American guitarist and composer
- Dan Hammer, American software engineer, entrepreneur and environmental economist
- Dan Hammer (baseball) (born 1997), American baseball player
- Daniela Hammer-Tugendhat (1946–2025), Austrian art historian
- Dick Hammer (1930–1999), American Olympic athlete and actor
- Doc Hammer (born 1967), American voice actor, musician, writer and artist
- Edward E. Hammer (1931–2012), American engineer who was at the forefront of fluorescent lighting research
- Ellen Hammer (1921–2001), American historian
- Emanuel Frederick Hammer (1926–2005), American psychologist and author
- Emerson Hammer (1856–1940), American politician
- Ernest E. L. Hammer (1884–1970), American lawyer, politician, and judge
- Ernst Hammer (1884–1957), highly decorated Generalleutnant in the Wehrmacht during World War II
- Even Hammer (1732–1800), Norwegian civil servant
- Fred Hammer (1930–2020), Luxembourgish sprinter
- Frederic E. Hammer (1909–1980), New York politician and judge
- Friedrich Julius Hammer (1810–1862), German poet
- Graeme Hammer, Australian crop scientist
- Heathcote Hammer (1905–1961), Australian World War II general
- J. D. Hammer (born 1994), American baseball player
- Jan Hammer (born 1948), Czech-American musician, composer, and record producer
- Jay Hammer (born 1944), American actor
- John Hammer (born 1935), Australian sports administrator, founder of competitions for older players
- Jon Ludvig Hammer (born 1990), Norwegian chess player
- Jørgen Hammer (born 1991), Norwegian association football player
- Joshua Hammer (born 1957), American journalist
- Julie Hammer (born 1955), Royal Australian Air Force air vice marshal
- Kim Hammer (born 1958), American politician from Arkansas
- Kristian Hammer (born 1976), Norwegian Nordic combined skier
- Lance Hammer, American independent filmmaker
- Lisa Hammer (born 1967), American filmmaker, actress, composer and singer
- Lucy Hammer (died 2001), American politician
- Lukas Hammer (born 1983), Austrian politician
- Marion P. Hammer, American gun rights activist, president of the National Rifle Association
- Michael Hammer (disambiguation), multiple people
- Mike Hammer (diplomat) (born 1963), in the U.S. State Department
- Moshe Hammer (born 1946), Canadian violinist
- Paul Hammer (1900–1978), Luxembourgish sprinter and long jumper
- Peter Ladislaw Hammer (1936–2006), Romanian-born American mathematician
- Reuven Hammer (1933–2019), American Conservative Jewish rabbi, scholar, author and lecturer
- Richard Hammer (1897–1969), German politician
- Sarah Hammer (born 1983), American professional racing cyclist and two-time Olympic silver medalist
- Simon Christian Hammer (1866–1932), Norwegian writer and journalist
- Victor Hammer (1882–1967), Austrian-born American painter, sculptor, printer and typographer
- Will Hammer, pseudonym of William Hinds (1887–1957), American co-founder of Hammer Film Productions
- William C. Hammer (1865–1930), U.S. Representative from North Carolina
- William H. Hammer, founder Hammer & Co., South Australian photographers
- William Joseph Hammer (1858–1934), American electrical engineer and aviator; president of the Edison Pioneers
- Zach Hammer (born 2006), American speed climber
- Zevulun Hammer (1936–1998), Israeli politician

== Fictional ==
- Mike Hammer (character), a fictional hard boiled detective
  - Mickey Spillane's Mike Hammer (1958 TV series)
  - Mickey Spillane's Mike Hammer (1984 TV series)
- Justin Hammer, fictional businessman from the Marvel series

== See also ==
- Joseph von Hammer-Purgstall (1774–1856), Austrian orientalist
- MC Hammer (born 1962), stage name of American rapper Stanley Kirk Burrell
