= Hummer (disambiguation) =

Hummer is a sub-brand and then-division of General Motors.

Hummer may also refer to:

== Vehicles ==
- Humvee, a military vehicle
  - Hummer H1, a civilian version of the Humvee
  - Hummer H2, other vehicle of the Hummer brand
  - Hummer H3, other vehicle of the Hummer brand
  - GMC Hummer EV, an electric suv and pickup truck
- Harley-Davidson Hummer, a motorcycle
- E-2 Hawkeye, an aircraft

== Music ==
- The Hummer, a 2006 album by Devin Townsend
- "Hummer" (Foals song), a 2007 single
- Hummer, another name for the Corrugaphone
- A song by Smashing Pumpkins on the album Siamese Dream

== Other meanings ==
- Hummer (surname)
- Hummingbird, a bird
- Hummer (cocktail), a boozy milkshake made with vodka
- Hummer (1997 video game), a 1990s Sega arcade video game
- Hummer (2009 video game), a 2009 Sega arcade game
- Hummer Team, a Taiwanese bootleg video game company
- A person or thing that hums
- A slang term for fellatio

== See also ==
- Hammer (disambiguation)
