= Hammer (nickname) =

As a nickname, Hammer or the Hammer may refer to:

== Pre-modern era ==
- Judas Maccabeus (died 160 BC), Jewish rebel leader
- Charles Martel (686–741), Frankish ruler

== Modern era ==
- Hank Aaron (1934–2021), American baseball player
- Jörg Albertz (born 1971), German footballer
- Gabe Carimi (born 1988), All-American football player
- Mark Coleman (born 1964), American mixed-martial artist, collegiate, Olympic and professional wrestler
- Tom DeLay (born 1947), 23rd Majority Leader of the United States House of Representatives
- Armen Gilliam (1964–2011), American basketball player
- Matt Hamill (born 1976), American mixed-martial artist, collegiate wrestler
- Alexander Hammerstone (born 1991), American professional wrestler
- Joel Hanrahan (born 1981), American baseball player
- Richard H. Helmholz (born 1940), American law professor
- Thomas Hitzlsperger (born 1982), German footballer, "Der Hammer"
- Vyacheslav Molotov (1890–1986), Soviet politician and diplomat
- Dave Schultz (ice hockey) (born 1949), Canadian hockey player
- Jim Shapiro (attorney), American personal injury lawyer
- Jessie Tuggle (born 1965), American football linebacker for the Atlanta Falcons
- Greg Valentine (born 1950), American professional wrestler
- Fred Williamson (born 1938), American football player and actor
- Josh Willingham (born 1979), American baseball player
- Hamiso Tabuai-Fidow (born 2001), Australian rugby league player
- Matthew Wreggitt, Canadian radio personality

== See also ==
- Hammer (disambiguation)
- Hammer (surname)
