= Haus für Mozart =

Opera house in Salzburg, Austria

Coordinates: 47°47′52″N 13°02′33″E

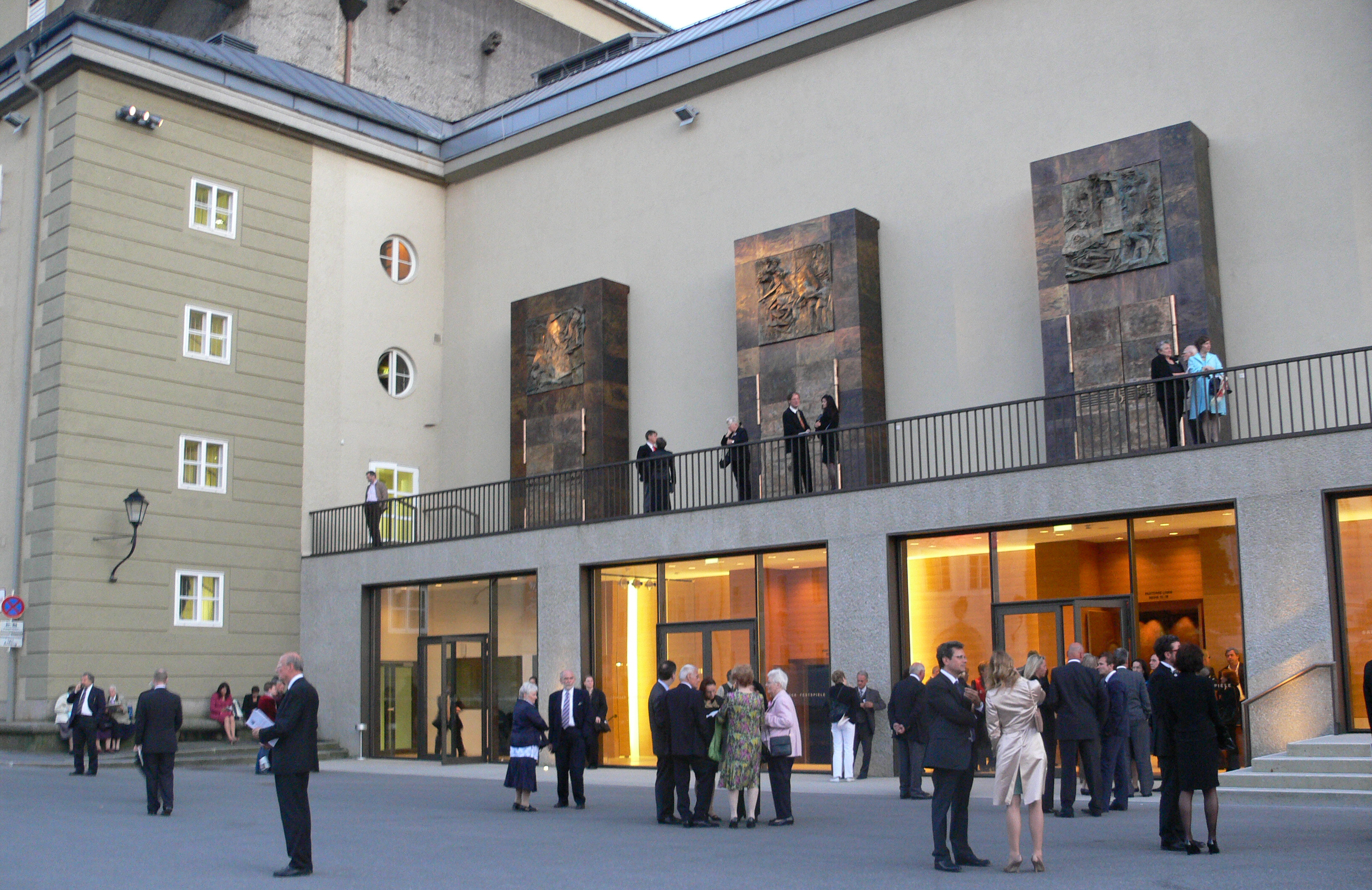
Entrance of House for Mozart

The Haus für Mozart, or House for Mozart, is a 1,500-seat theatre of the Salzburg Festival in the city of that name in Austria. It was established in 1925 when horse stables were converted into a venue for the mystery plays that were a main facet of the five-year-old festival, becoming the festival's first dedicated performance space, its Festspielhaus. This name it retained through three rebuildings until, in 1960, the larger Neues Festspielhaus opened next door, whereupon it took the name Altes Festspielhaus, or Old Festival-House. But three seasons later, to end confusion in the minds of visitors unaware of the history, both theatres were renamed for their sizes, and the smaller was now the Kleines Festspielhaus. For forty-two seasons, through 2004, the nomenclature was settled. Then the theater was closed for its fourth gutting and reconstruction. It gained its current name upon reopening in 2006 as the festival's principal theatre for Mozart and Rossini operas as well as Baroque stageworks.

== History ==
The venue was inaugurated with Hugo von Hofmannsthal's play Das Salzburger große Welttheater directed by Max Reinhardt. But there were prompt changes. After the first season (1925) it was rebuilt under the direction of Clemens Holzmeister, and after the Nazi annexation of Austria (1938) it was rebuilt again by Benno von Arent. A third reconstruction, by Salzburg architects Hans Hofmann and Erich Engels, took place after the Second World War.

=== Dedication to Mozart ===
In anticipation of Salzburg-born Mozart's 250th anniversary in 2006, local politicians led by Landeshauptmann Franz Schausberger reached a financial agreement with the Republic of Austria to modernize and technically upgrade the theater. Architects Wilhelm Holzbauer, a pupil of Holzmeister, and the Luxembourger François Valentiny drew up the plans, which included structural changes to the lobby area between the Felsenreitschule, another venue, and what would become the Haus für Mozart. Three new entrances were designed by the artist Josef Zenzmaier, and a golden art-wall in the foyer was created by the German Michael Hammers. The changes reconfigured the theatre to host 1,580 people: 1,495 seats and 85 stances (standing places). Mozart's opera Le nozze di Figaro conducted by Nikolaus Harnoncourt inaugurated the new space.

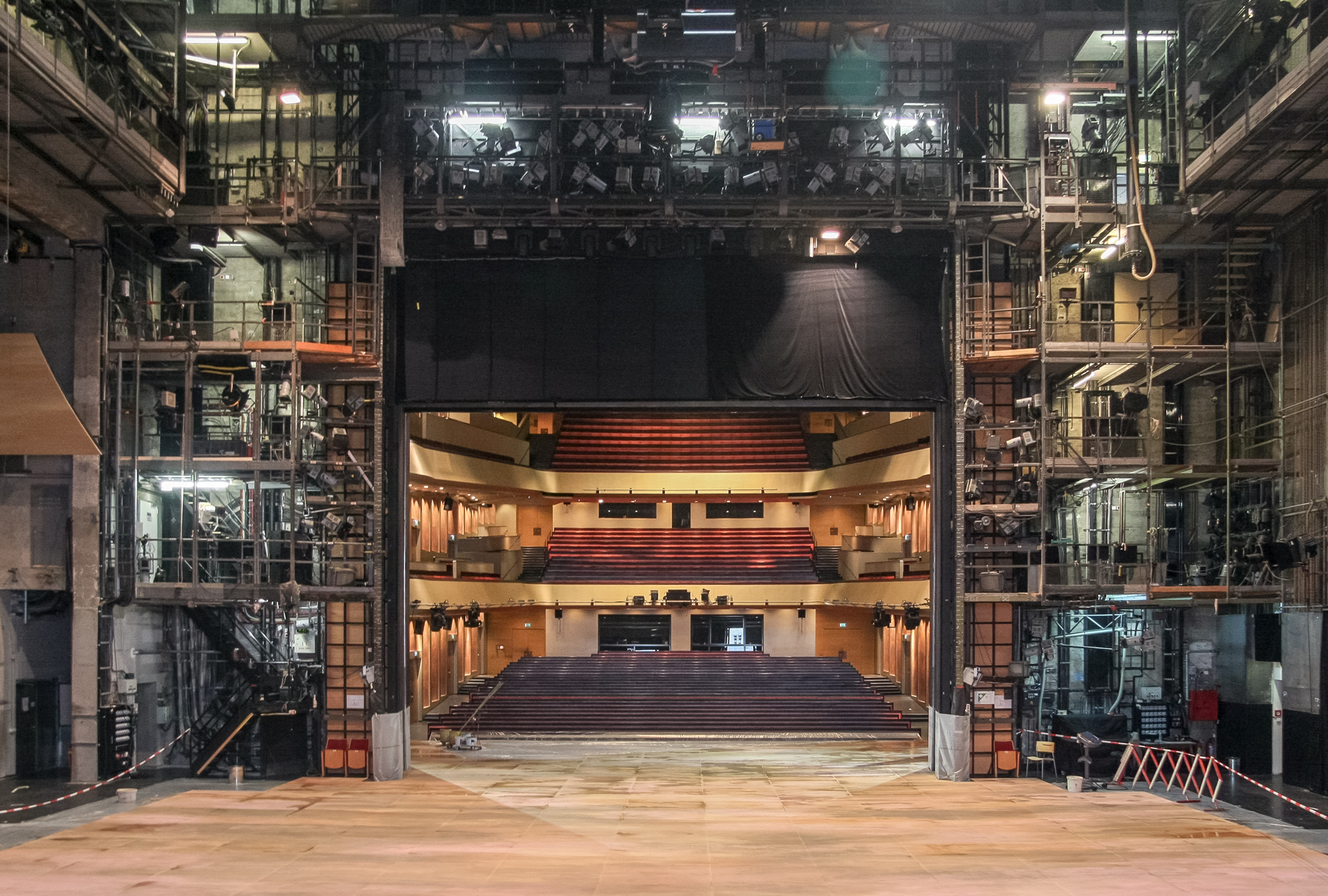
The stage

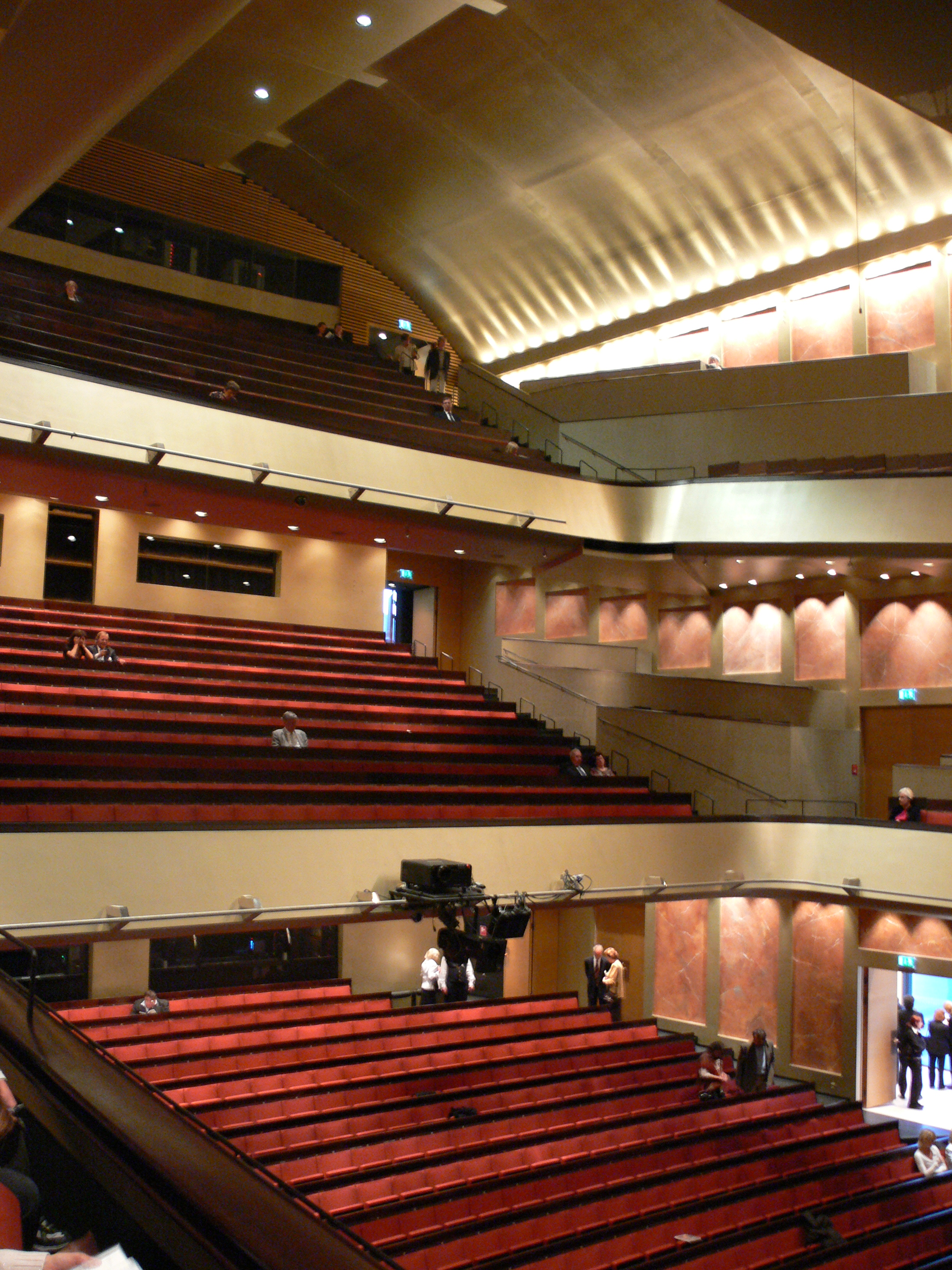
The auditorium

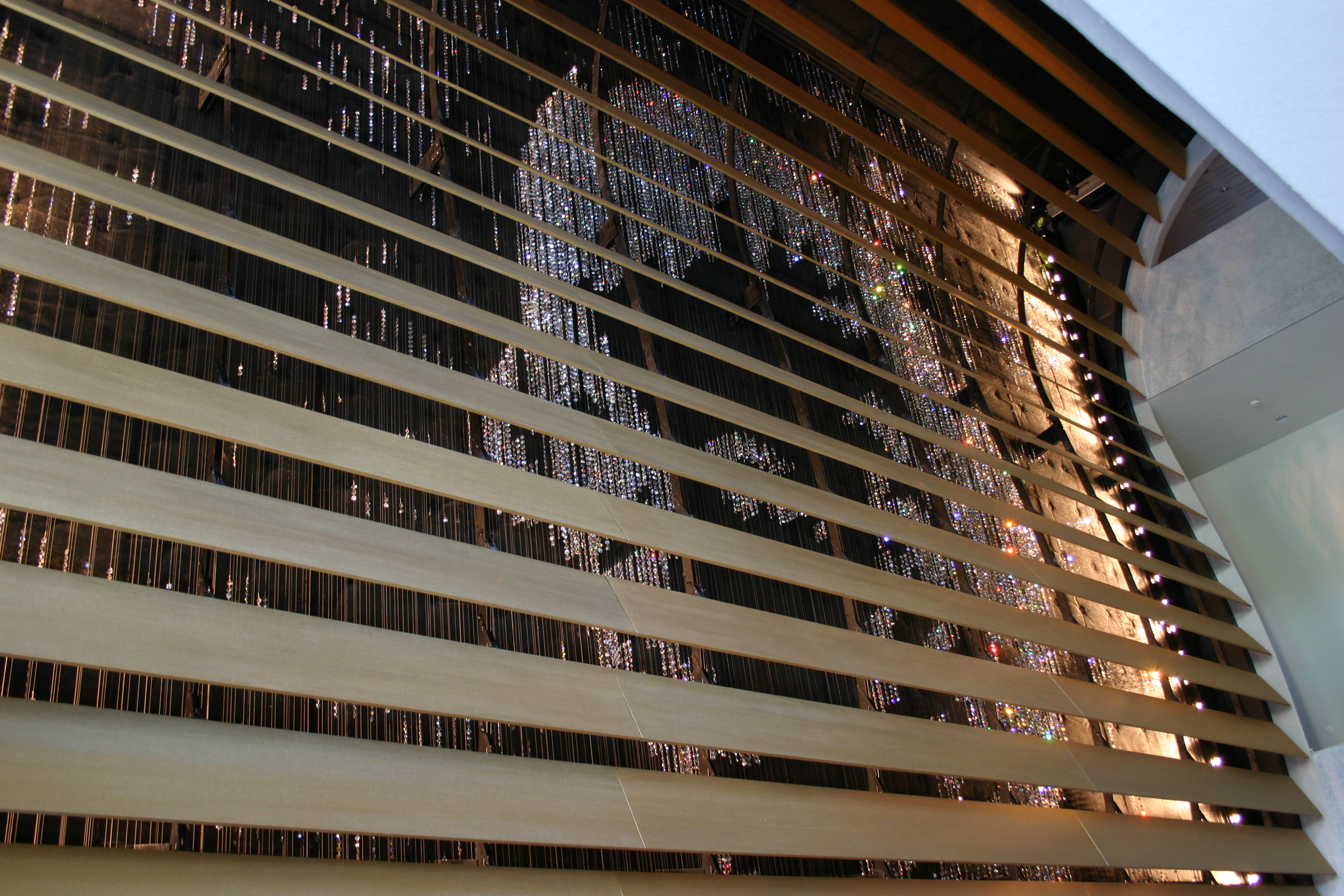
Golden Wall

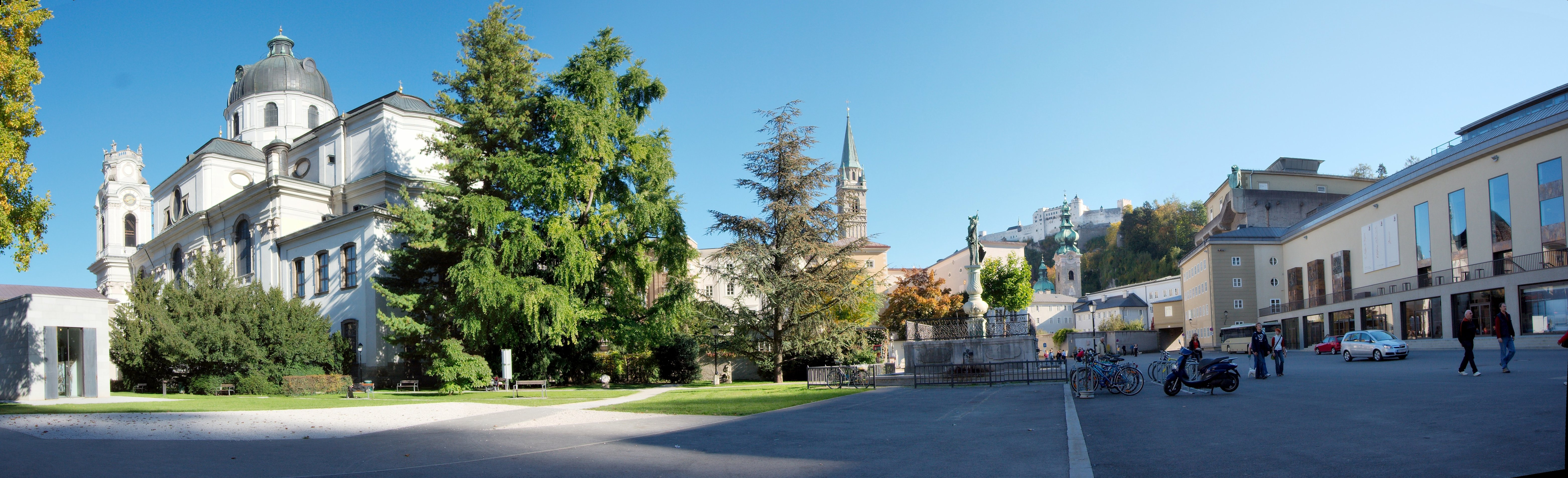
Kollegienkirche and House for Mozart

== Trivia ==
The front was used as the luxury hotel Nouveau Rothschild in the action movie Knight and Day with Cameron Diaz and Tom Cruise.

== See also ==
- Großes Festspielhaus
- Felsenreitschule
