= Michael Hammer =

Michael Hammer or Mike Hammer may refer to:

- Michael Hammer (politician) (born 1977), Austrian politician
- Michael Armand Hammer (1955–2022), American philanthropist and businessman
- Michael Martin Hammer (1948–2008), engineer and author
- Mike Hammer (character), a fictional hard boiled detective
  - Mickey Spillane's Mike Hammer (1958 TV series)
  - Mickey Spillane's Mike Hammer (1984 TV series)
- Mike Hammer (diplomat) (born 1963), official in the U.S. State Department

== See also ==
- Michael Hammers (born 1965), German artist and designer
- Hammer (surname)
