= Senator Hammer =

Senator Hammer may refer to:

- Emerson Hammer (1856–1940), Washington State Senate
- Frederic E. Hammer (1909–1980), New York State Senate
- Kim Hammer (born 1958), Arkansas State Senate
