= Felsenreitschule =

Theatre in Salzburg, Austria

Coordinates: 47°47′54″N 13°02′30″E

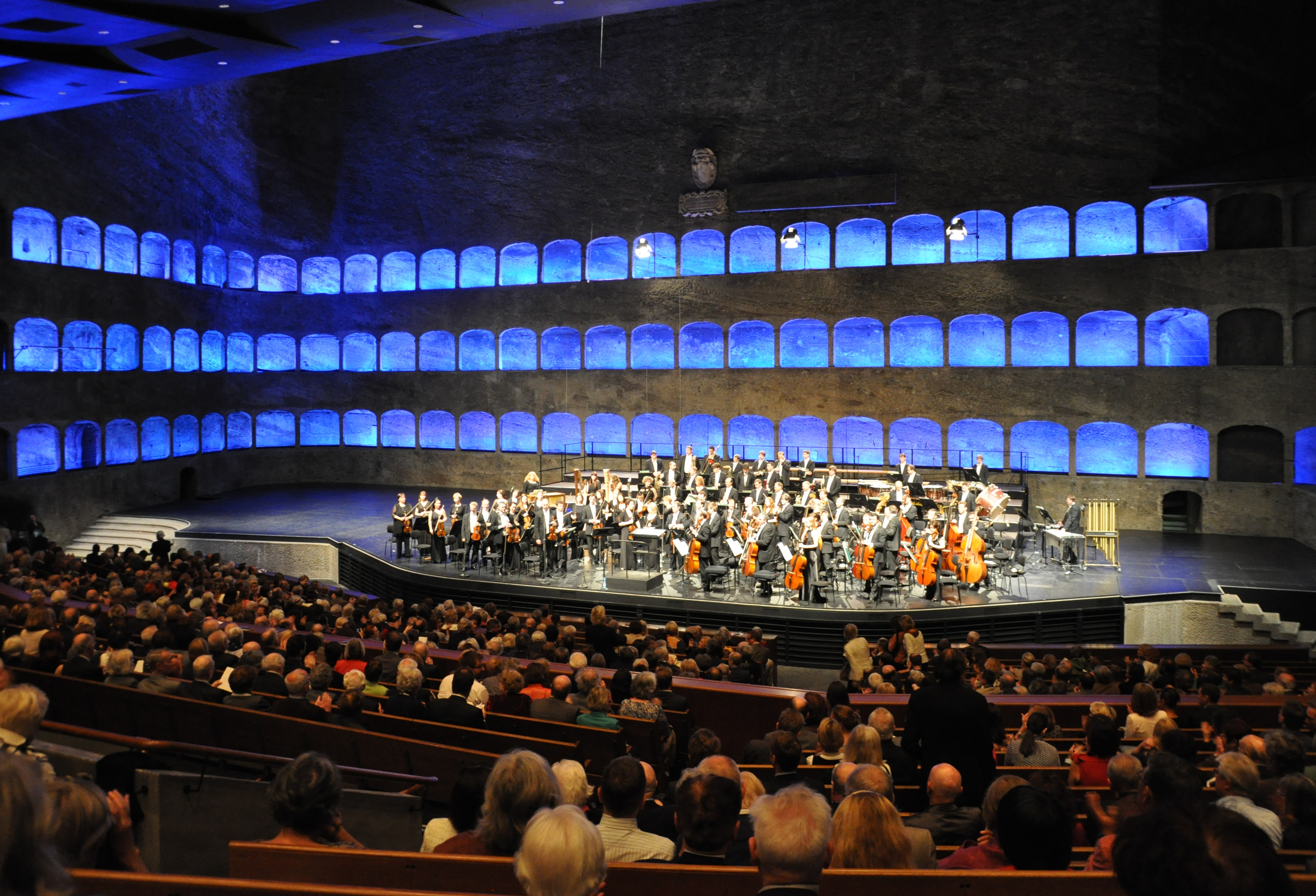
Auditorium

The Felsenreitschule (literally "rock riding school") is a theatre in Salzburg, Austria and a venue of the Salzburg Festival.

== History ==
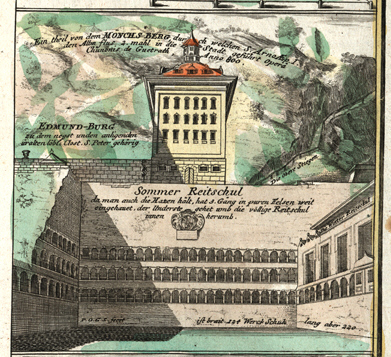
Salzburg Felsenreitschule, engraving by Johann Homann, c. 1712

A first Baroque theatre was erected in 1693–94 at the behest of the Salzburg prince-archbishop Johann Ernst von Thun, according to plans probably designed by Johann Bernhard Fischer von Erlach. Built in the former Mönchsberg quarry for conglomerate rock used in the new Salzburg Cathedral construction, it was located next to the archiepiscopal stables (at the site of the present Großes Festspielhaus) and used as a summer riding school and for animal hunts. The audience was seated in 96 arcades carved into the Mönchsberg rock on three floors. After the secularisation of the prince-archbishopric, the premises were used by the cavalry of the Austrian Imperial-Royal Army as well as by Bundesheer forces after World War I.

From 1926, the Felsenreitschule was used as an open-air theatre for performances of the Salzburg Festival. With the auditorium reversed, the former audience arcades now served as a natural stage setting. The first production was Carlo Goldoni's The Servant of Two Masters, directed by Max Reinhardt. In 1933, Clemens Holzmeister designed for Max Reinhardt the "Faust Town", a multiple-stage setting for Reinhardt's legendary production of Goethe's Faust.

In 1948 Herbert von Karajan first used the Felsenreitschule as an opera stage, for performances of Christoph Willibald Gluck's Orfeo ed Euridice. This was followed in 1949 by the premiere of Carl Orff's setting of the ancient tragedy Antigone by Sophocles, translated into German by Friedrich Hölderlin, conducted by Ferenc Fricsay. Between 1968 and 1970, the Felsenreitschule was again remodeled according to plans by Clemens Holzmeister and inaugurated with Ludwig van Beethoven's Fidelio under the baton of Karl Böhm.

== Architecture ==
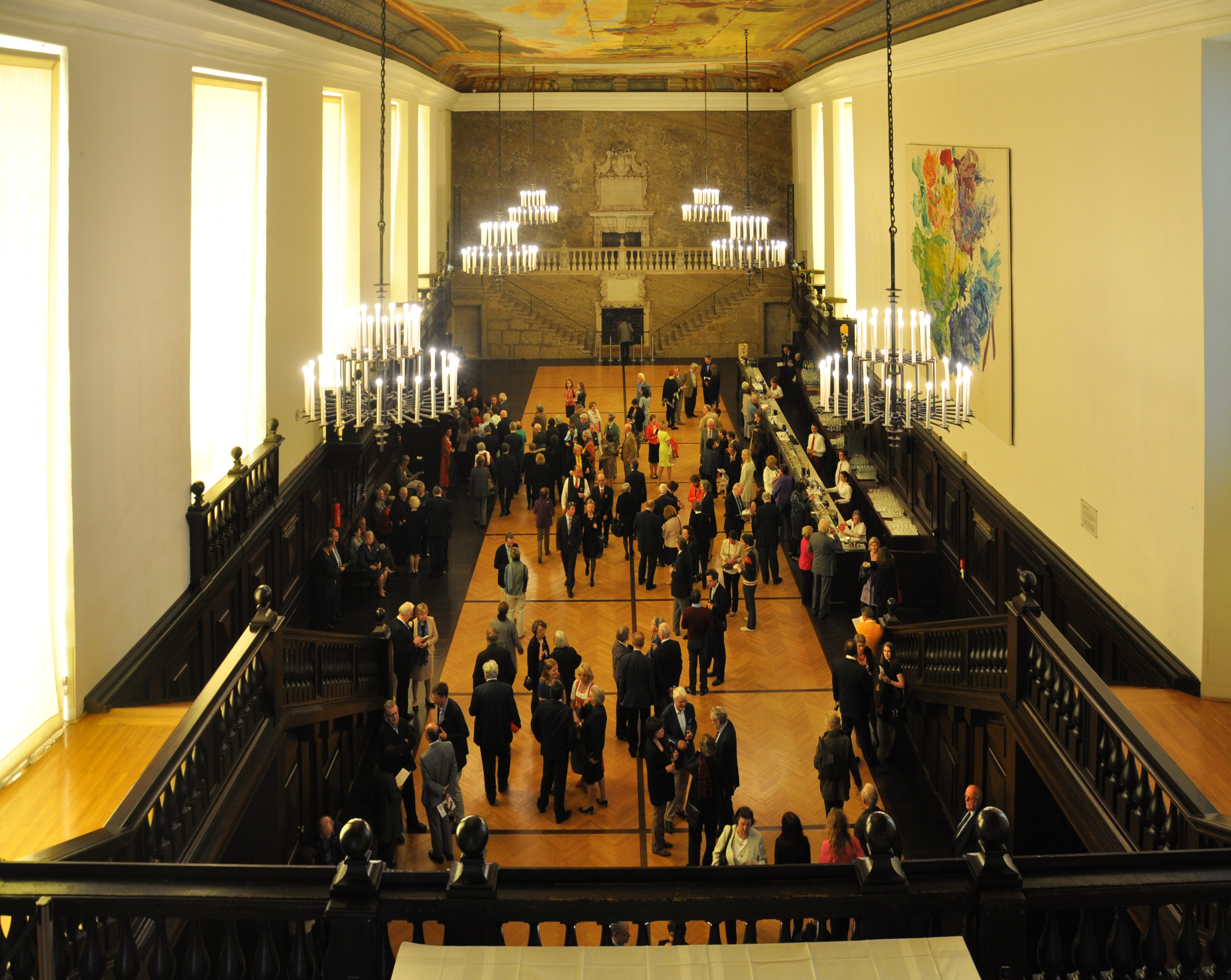
Karl-Böhm-Saal

The stage has a width of 40 metres (130 ft), and 4 metres (13 ft) understage. Also renovated was the cantilevered grandstand with the underlying scene dock. A light-tight, rain tarp to dampen the noise and protect the stage was also added. This roof can be opened. The theater holds 1412 seats and 25 standing places.

Between the summers of 2010 and 2011 festival, the roof was renewed: The new design added 700 square metres (7,500 sq ft) of floor space for equipment and rehearsal rooms. The new pitched roof consists of three mobile segment surfaces and is on five telescopic arms and can be extended and retracted in six minutes. Suspension points on telescopic supports for stage equipment (hoists), improved sound and heat insulation, and two lighting bridges optimize the action on stage. The Felsenreitschule shares its foyer with the Kleines Festspielhaus (House for Mozart).

== In popular culture ==
The Felsenreitschule was used as a location for the 1965 film version of The Sound of Music. It appears as the site of the Salzburg music festival where Captain von Trapp sings "Edelweiss" and from which the von Trapp family disappear.
