= Cammer (surname) =

Cammer is a surname. Notable people with the surname include:

- Harold I. Cammer (1909–1995), American labor lawyer
- Margaret Cammer, daughter of Harold I Cammer and spouse of Joan Snyder, American painter
- Megan Cammer, Miss Charleston in the Miss South Carolina 2012

== See also ==
- Hammer (surname)
