= Hammer (American automobile) =

Defunct American motor vehicle manufacturer

The Hammer was an American automobile built in Detroit, Michigan by the Hammer Motor Company from 1905 to 1906. The Hammer was a light car built with a two-cylinder, 12 hp engine in 1905. This was replaced with a 24 hp, four-cylinder engine for 1906. The five-seater tonneau weighed 1,800 lb (820 kg), and came with a choice of a planetary or sliding-gear transmission, with a shaft final drive. The Hammer Motor Company was integrated as part of Hammer-Sommer when they went defunct in 1905.
