= Salzburg Festival =

Annual music and drama festival held in Salzburg, Austria

Salzburg Festival Salzburger Festspiele
- Genre: music; drama
- Begins: late July
- Ends: end of August
- Frequency: annual
- Locations: Salzburg, Austria
- Inaugurated: 1920; 106 years ago
- People: Hugo von Hofmannsthal; Richard Strauss; Alfred Roller; Franz Schalk; Max Reinhardt
- Website: www.salzburgerfestspiele.at

The Salzburg Festival (German: Salzburger Festspiele) is a prominent festival of music and drama established in 1920. It is held each summer, for five weeks starting in late July, in Salzburg, Austria, the birthplace of Wolfgang Amadeus Mozart. Mozart's operas are a focus of the festival; one highlight is the annual performance of Hofmannsthal's play Jedermann (Everyman).

Since 1967, an annual Salzburg Easter Festival has also been held, organized by a separate organization.

== History ==
Music festivals were held in Salzburg at irregular intervals since 1877 by the International Mozarteum Foundation but were discontinued in 1910. A festival was planned for 1914, but it was cancelled at the outbreak of World War I. In 1917, Friedrich Gehmacher and Heinrich Damisch formed an organization known as the Salzburger Festspielhaus-Gemeinde to establish an annual festival of drama and music, emphasizing especially the works of Mozart. At the close of the war in 1918, the festival's revival was championed by five men now regarded as its founders: the poet and dramatist Hugo von Hofmannsthal, the composer Richard Strauss, the scenic designer Alfred Roller, the conductor Franz Schalk, and the director Max Reinhardt, then intendant of the Deutsches Theater in Berlin, who had produced the first performance of Hofmannsthal's play Jedermann at the Berlin Zirkus Schumann arena in 1911.

According to Hofmannsthal's political writings, the Salzburg Festival, as a counterpart to the Prussian-North German uncompromising worldview, should emphasize the centuries-old Habsburg principles of "live and let live" with regard to ethnic groups, peoples, minorities, religions, cultures and languages. The Salzburg Festival was officially inaugurated on 22 August 1920 with Reinhardt's performance of Hofmannsthal's Jedermann on the steps of Salzburg Cathedral, starring Alexander Moissi. The practice has become a tradition, and the play is now always performed at Cathedral Square; since 1921 it has been accompanied by several performances of chamber music and orchestral works. The first operatic production came in 1922, with Mozart's Don Giovanni conducted by Richard Strauss. The singers were mainly drawn from the Wiener Staatsoper, including Richard Tauber in the part of Don Ottavio.

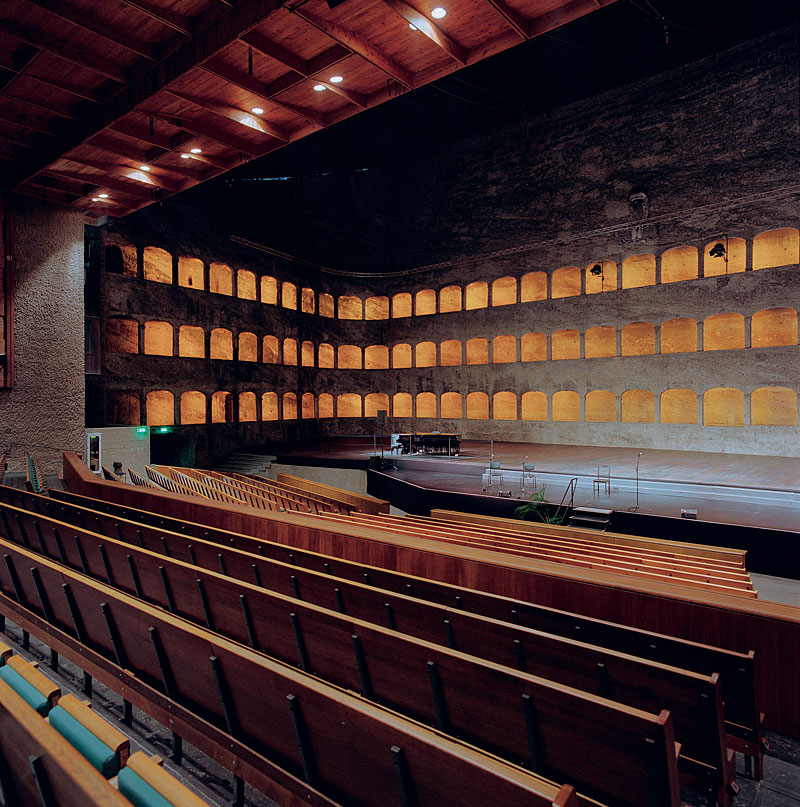
Felsenreitschule theatre

The first festival hall was erected in 1925 at the former Archbishops' horse stables on the northern foot of the Mönchsberg mountain, on the basis of plans by Clemens Holzmeister; it opened with Gozzi's Turandot dramatized by Karl Vollmöller. At that time the festival had already developed a large-scale program including live broadcasts by the Austrian RAVAG radio network. The following year the adjacent former episcopal Felsenreitschule riding academy, carved into the Mönchsberg rock face, was converted into a theater, inaugurated with a performance of The Servant of Two Masters by Carlo Goldoni. In the 21st century, the original festival hall, suitable only for concerts, was reconstructed as a third venue for fully staged opera and concert performances and reopened in 2006 as the Haus für Mozart (House for Mozart).

During the years from 1934 to 1937, famed conductors such as Arturo Toscanini and Bruno Walter conducted many performances. In 1936, the festival featured a performance by the Trapp Family Singers, whose story was later depicted in the musical The Sound of Music (featuring a scene of the Trapp Family singing at the Felsenreitschule, but inaccurately set in 1938). In 1937, Boyd Neel and his orchestra premiered Benjamin Britten's Variations on a Theme of Frank Bridge at the festival.

The festival's popularity suffered a major blow as a consequence of the Anschluss, the annexation of Austria by Nazi Germany in 1938. Toscanini resigned in protest, artists of Jewish descent like Reinhardt and Georg Solti had to emigrate, and Jedermann, last performed by Attila Hörbiger, had to be dropped. Nevertheless, the festival remained in operation until in 1944 it was cancelled by the order of Reich Minister Joseph Goebbels in reaction to the 20 July plot. At the end of World War II, the Salzburg Festival reopened in summer 1945 immediately after the Allied victory in Europe.

== Post World War II festivals ==
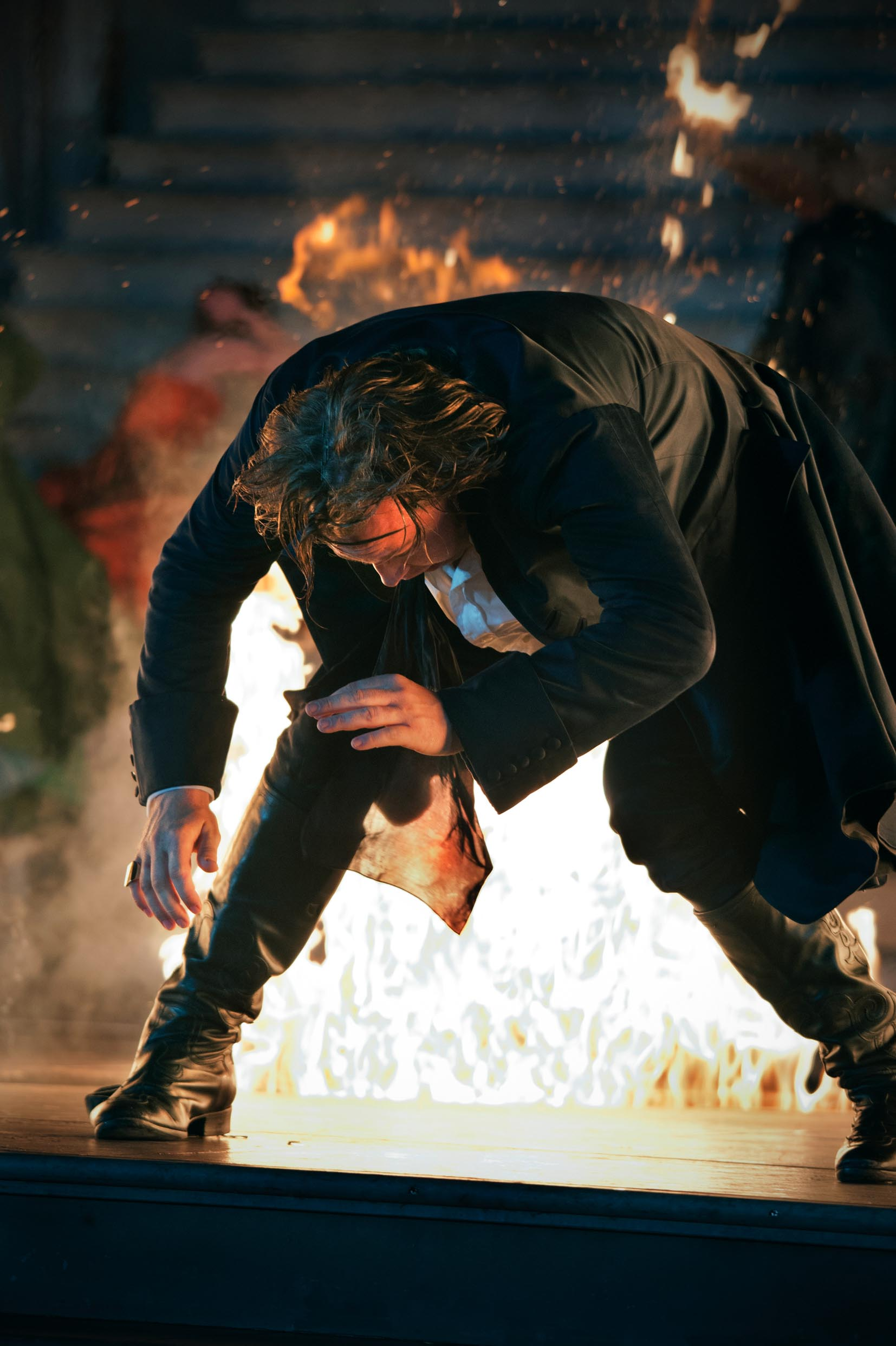
Jedermann, 2012 Photo: Luigi Caputo

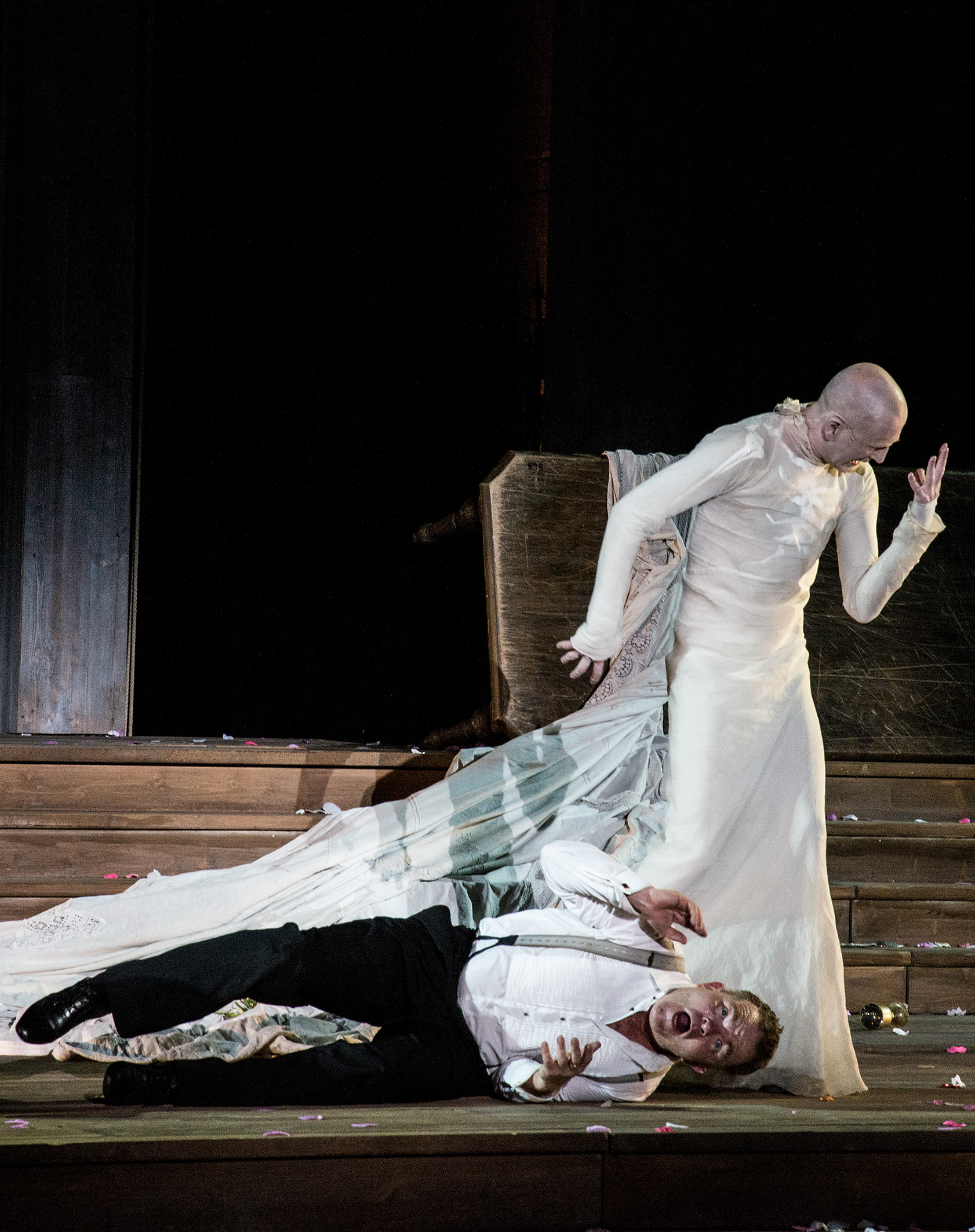
Jedermann, 2014 Photo: Francisco Peralta Torrejón

The post-war festival slowly regained its prominence as a summer opera festival, especially for works by Mozart, with conductor Herbert von Karajan becoming artistic director in 1956. In 1960 the Great Festival Hall (Großes Festspielhaus) opera house opened its doors. As this summer festival gained fame and stature as a venue for opera, drama, and classical concert presentation, its musical repertoire concentrated on Mozart and Strauss, but other works, such as Verdi's Falstaff and Beethoven's Fidelio, were also performed.

As pert of an effort to raise international awareness of the dangers associated with the proliferation of nuclear weapons during the Cold War era, the Salzburg Festival also hosted a "Concert for Peace" with the Saxon State Orchestra Dresden under the musical direction of Seiji Ozawa in 1976. In homage to the victims of the bombing of Hiroshima the performance included Krzysztof Penderecki's Threnody to the Victims of Hiroshima .

Upon Karajan's death in 1989, the festival was drastically modernized and expanded by director Gerard Mortier, who was succeeded by Peter Ruzicka in 2001.

The play Jedermann by Hugo von Hofmannsthal is still performed annually on the Dome square, in front of the cathedral.

== 21st century ==
In 2006, the festival was led by intendant Jürgen Flimm and concert director Markus Hinterhäuser. That year, Salzburg celebrated the 250th anniversary of Mozart's birth by staging all 22 of his operatic works, including two unfinished operas. All 22 were filmed and released on DVD in November 2006. The 2006 festival also saw the opening of the Haus für Mozart.

In 2010, the opera Dionysos by Wolfgang Rihm who compiled for his own libretto texts from Nietzsche's Dionysian-Dithyrambs premiered. Alexander Pereira succeeded Flimm as intendant, who departed in 2011 to become director of the Berlin State Opera. Pereira's objective for the festival was to present only new productions. When he resigned at the end of the 2014 festival season to take over as the General Director of La Scala, Sven-Eric Bechtolf, who had served as Drama Director of the Salzburg Festival since 2012, took over as Interim General Manager. The 2015 festival marked the first one for which Bechtolf was responsible for the artistic programming. Budget cuts led to a retreat from Pereira's "new productions only" objective.

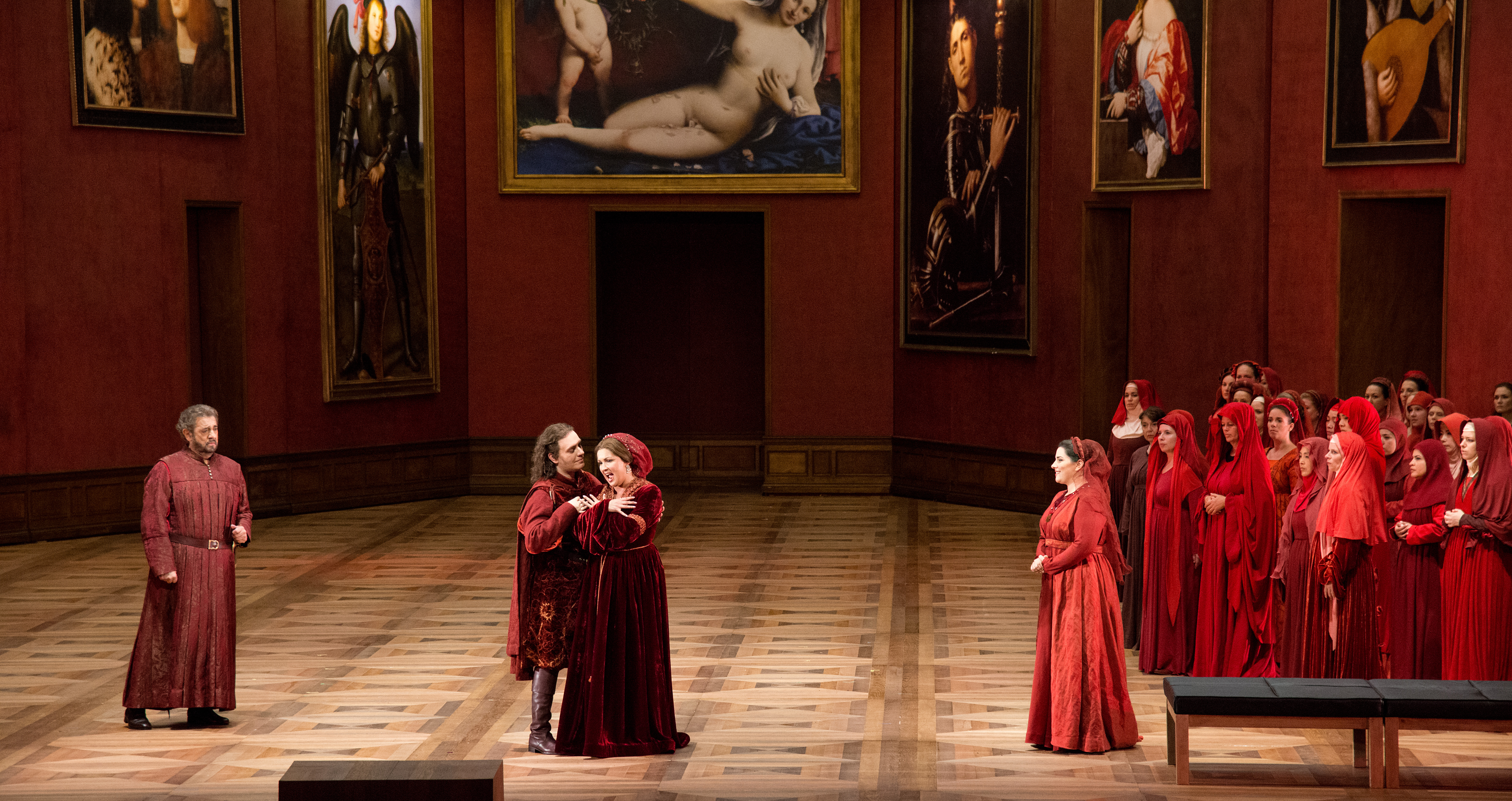
Plácido Domingo, Francesco Meli, Anna Netrebko and Diana Haller in Il trovatore, 2014 Photo: Christian Michelides

The 2015 opera program presented only three new productions—Le nozze di Figaro, directed by Bechtolf; Fidelio, directed by Claus Guth; and Wolfgang Rihm's rarely performed Die Eroberung von Mexico (The Conquest of Mexico), directed by Peter Konwitschny. The remaining four opera productions—Norma, Il trovatore, Iphigénie en Tauride, and Der Rosenkavalier—were revivals. In 2018, Lydia Steier was the first woman to stage Die Zauberflöte.

From 1995 to 2021, Helga Rabl-Stadler served as president of the Festival. Markus Hinterhäuser became Intendant in 2016. In April 2024, the Festival announced an extension of Hinterhäuser's contract as Intendant through 2031. He terminated his contract prematurely in 2026. Since 2026, Karin Bergmann is Intendant.

During the COVID-19 pandemic, Hinterhäuser and Rabl-Stadler developed a security concept and thus the Salzburg Festival was able to continue with some performances in 2020 – the only festival in Europe to do so. An Elektra, directed by Krzysztof Warlikowski and conducted by Franz Welser-Möst, was shown, and Così fan tutte, directed by Christof Loy and conducted by Joana Mallwitz. The slogan for that year was taken from Hofmannsthal:

″Wo der Wille nur erwacht, ist schon fast etwas erreicht″

=== Economy ===
The Salzburg Festival reports in 2017 ticket sales revenue of about €27 million, and directly and indirectly creates value to the sum of €183 million in Salzburg per year. The festival thereby secures employment in Salzburg (including year-round employees and full-time equivalent adjusted seasonal workers of the festival) of 2800 full-time jobs (Austria 3400). Through their effect in other sectors, directly and indirectly they provide the public sector with approximately €77 million of taxes and duties.

== Whitsun Festival ==
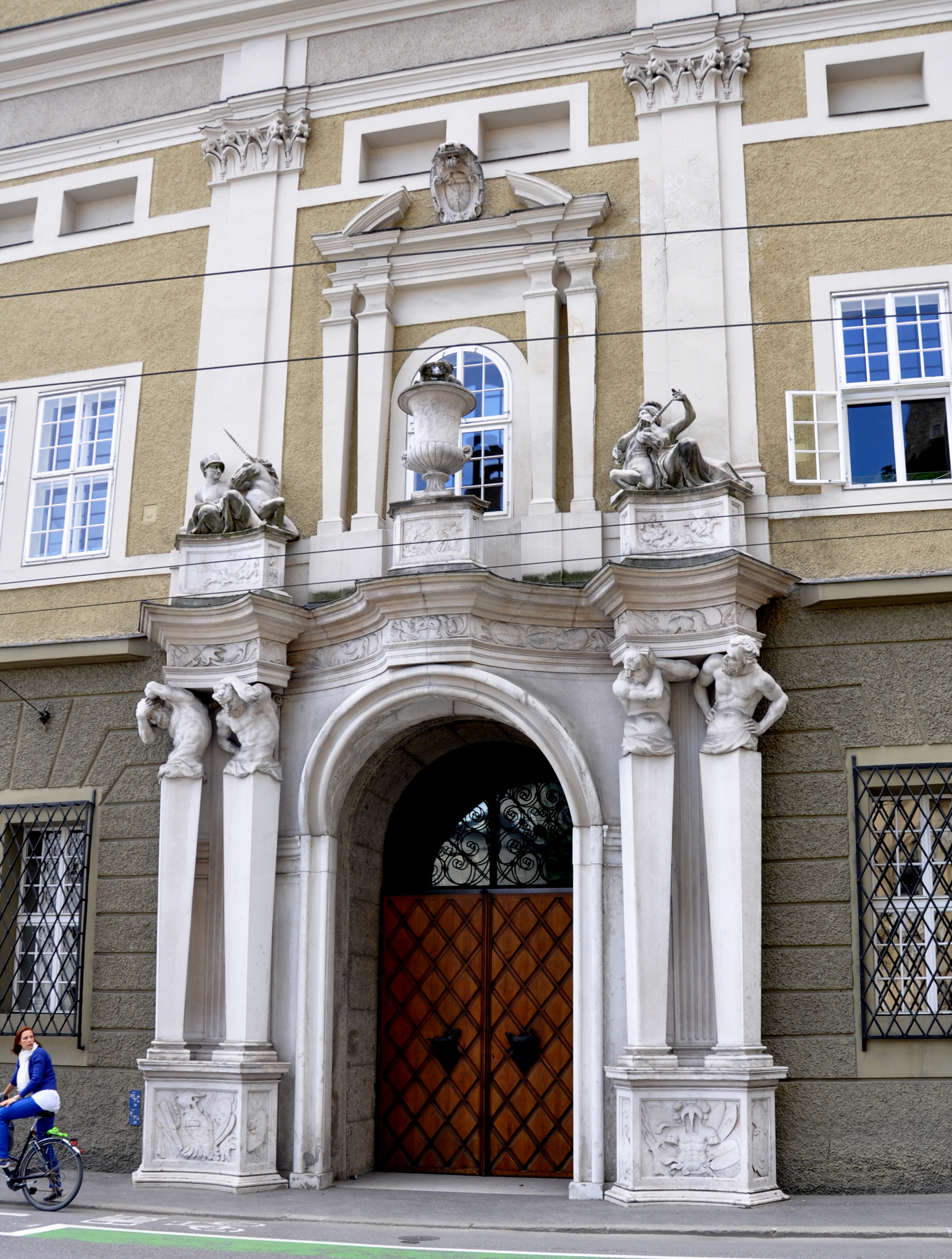
Great Festival Hall entrance at Herbert-von-Karajan-Platz in Salzburg, Austria

The Salzburg Whitsun Festival (Pfingstfestspiele Salzburg) is held every year over Pentecost (Whitsun) weekend in late May or early June, organised by the Salzburger Festspielfonds since 1998. It takes place at the Great Festival Theatre and the Haus für Mozart. It was created in 1973 by Herbert von Karajan, at the time as a complement to the Salzburg Easter Festival and called the Salzburg Whitsun Concerts (Pfingstkonzerte Salzburg). When taken over by the summer festival, it was augmented with an opera performance, and given a focus on the baroque and classical periods, which are not traditionally played in Salzburg. Since 2012, its artistic director has been the Italian mezzo-soprano Cecilia Bartoli, who also performs as the female lead.

The Whitsun opera production has often been revived a few weeks later at the summer festival; this became standard practice under Bartoli.

== See also ==
- List of opera festivals
