= HAMMER (spacecraft) =

Hyper-velocity Asteroid Mitigation Mission for Emergency Response (HAMMER) is a concept study by NASA on a spacecraft (8 tonnes) capable of detonating a nuclear bomb to deflect an asteroid, if it was on a collision course to Earth. The study is a collaboration between the National Nuclear Security Administration, NASA, and two Energy Department weapons labs.

== Bennu ==
NASA is working on a modelling study that considers the asteroid 101955 Bennu, which has a diameter of 246 meters and capable of a 1.15 gigaton impact, as a modelling target for the HAMMER concept. It is circling the Sun at 63,000 mph and 54 million miles from the Earth.

The two realistic responses considered in the study are the use of a spacecraft functioning as either a kinetic impactor or a nuclear explosive carrier to deflect the approaching asteroid.

== See also ==
- Asteroid impact avoidance
- Planetary defense
