= Jackhammer (disambiguation) =

A jackhammer is a percussive drill.

Jackhammer may also refer to:

- Jackhammer, a vertical suplex powerslam, a specific professional wrestling move
- Jackhammer (comics), a Marvel Comics villain
- Joliet JackHammers, a professional baseball team based in Joliet, Illinois
- MTX Jackhammer, a 22-inch (560 mm) subwoofer
- Pancor Jackhammer, an automatic-shotgun design

Jack Hammer may refer to:

- "Jack" Hammer, a character in the Rescue Heroes line
- Jack Hammer, a professional wrestler from United States Wrestling Association
- "Jack Hammer", a song by the Odds from their album Bedbugs
- Jack Hammer (songwriter) (1925–2016), pseudonym for songwriter and singer Earl Burroughs
- Jack Hammer (South African band)
- Otis Blackwell or Jack Hammer (1931–2002), African-American singer and songwriter

== See also ==
- Weasel (Marvel Comics), aka Jack Hammer
