= John Hammer =

John William Hammer OAM (born 27 September 1935) is an Australian sports official who is the founder of several sporting competitions for older players.

John Hammer was born in Sunbury, Victoria, Australia. In 1963, Hammer joined the Victorian Football League (VFL) Reserve Grade as a field umpire. In 1967 was promoted to the senior list and umpired 16 Victorian Country Football League matches.

In 1966, Hammer was co-founder and inaugural president of the East Keilor Cricket Club.

Hammer founded Superules (now known as AFL Masters), an Australian rules football competition for those over 35 years of age at a meeting at the Zero Inn, Nhill, Victoria on 29th August 1980. A football carnival is held at a different location in Australia each year. Hammer also founded Over 60s cricket in Australia in 2003, promoting cricket for those over 60 years of age (now known as Veterans Cricket).

In May 2010, Hammer founded the Mid-Year Cricket Association (MYCA) in Victoria, Australia, which plays cricket matches on synthetic wickets during May to August. MYCA now has 86 teams from 62 clubs. Hammer has been president from 2010 – 2015.

In 2009, Hammer was awarded an ICC Centenary Volunteer Medal for his services to cricket. Hammer was awarded the OAM for his services to cricket and seniors' sport in the 2017 Queen's Birthday Honours.
