= Hammer-Sommer =

Automobile

The Hammer-Sommer was an automobile built in Detroit, Michigan by the Hammer-Sommer Auto Carriage Company Ltd. from 1902 to 1904. The Hammer-Sommer came only as a five-seater, detachable tonneau model. The vehicle came equipped with a 12 hp opposed two-cylinder engine, mounted beneath the body, and had a planetary transmission. The company claimed the vehicle would reach 35 mph (56 km/h). The company was eventually split separately into the Hammer and Sommers companies.
