= Anna M. Hammer =

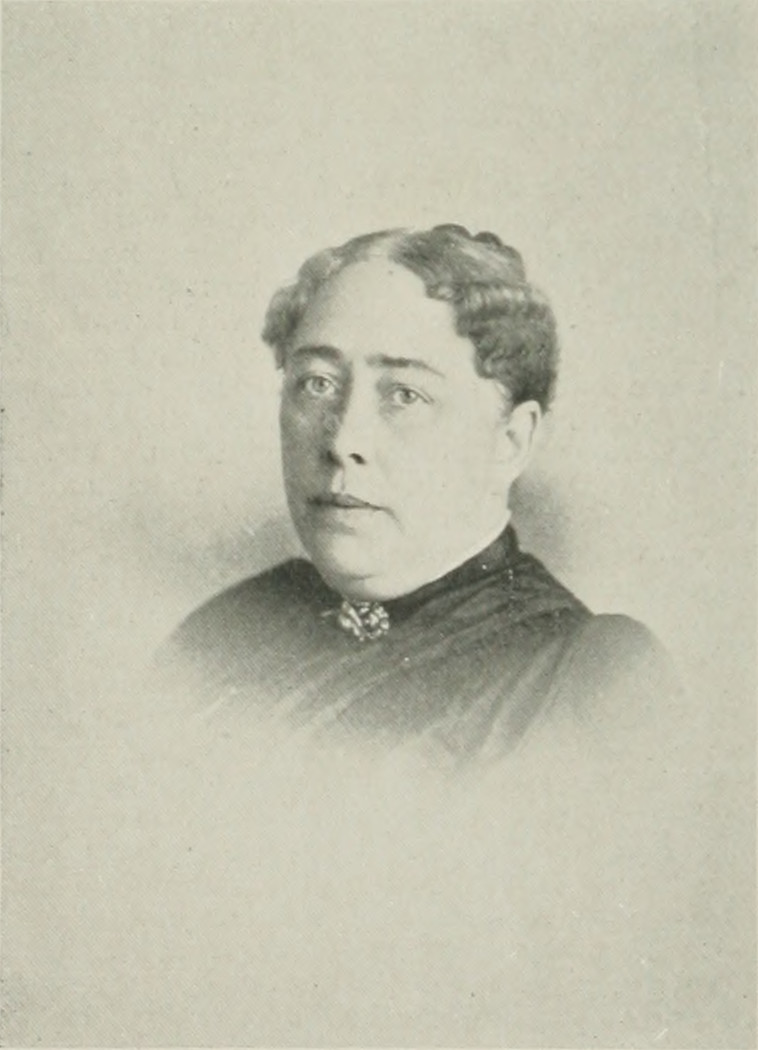
Photo portrait from, A Woman of the Century

Anna M. Hammer (September 14, 1840 – April 29, 1910) was an American philanthropist and temperance movement leader. For years, she was prominently identified with the Woman's Christian Temperance Union (WCTU), principally in New Jersey and Pennsylvania, and for a long time, served as president of the WCTU in the latter state.

== Biography ==
Anna Maria Nichols was born in Pottsville, Pennsylvania, September 14, 1840. She was of Revolutionary and Quaker stock. Her father was Alfred Lawton, one of the pioneers of the coal region. Her mother's great-grandfather was Michael Hillegas, the confidential friend of George Washington and the first Continental Treasurer of the United States. Hammer's great-grandfathers, General Francis W. Nichols and General William A. Nichols, distinguished themselves in the Revolutionary War, as did also her great-grandfather Lawton, who was a surgeon in the army and for many years was surgeon at West Point. Her grandfather Nichols was an officer in the War of 1812. She was a nice Henry K. Nichols, chief engineer of the Philadelphia and Reading Railroad.

Anna was educated in Philadelphia, Pottsville and Wilkes-Barre, Pennsylvania.

In the former city, she married William A. Hammer, and returned with him to Schuylkill County, Pennsylvania.

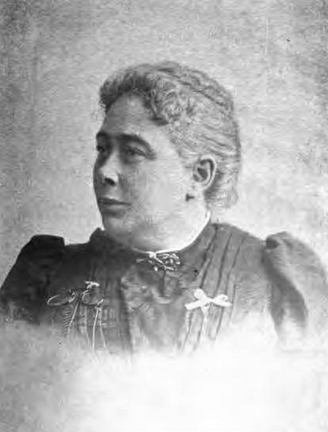
Anna Hammer (1899)

After several years, they moved to Newark, New Jersey. There, a great spiritual awakening came to her, followed by her entrance into temperance work as a member of the WCTU, very soon after the inauguration of that movement. Her national connection with the work has been as superintendent of three departments, work among the reformed, juvenile work and her present work, social or parlor work. She served as vice-president of the WCTU for the State of Pennsylvania before being elected president.

While living in Philadelphia, her husband was in charge of the Reformed Episcopal Theological Seminary. She died at her home in Westfield, New Jersey, April 29, 1910.
