= Beatrice Hammer =

French writer (born 1963)

Béatrice Hammer (born Paris, 4 February 1963) is a French writer who publishes novels and short stories for adults (since 1994) and novels for children (since 2005).

Hammer is also the author of a drama, Aristides based on the story of Aristides de Sousa Mendes, the Portuguese consul in Bordeaux, France in 1940.

== Bibliography ==
Her work has not been translated into English.

- Camille, short story in Les Coupons de Magali et autres nouvelles, Sépia 1994
- La princesse japonaise (The Japanese Princess), novel, Critérion 1994 Goya Prize of the First Novel, First Novel Prize of the University of Artoy (France)
- Cannibale blues (Cannibal Blues), novel, Pétrelle 1999
- Soleil glacé (Frozen Sun), novel, le Serpent à plumes 1999
- Lou et Lilas (Lou and Lilas), novel, Pétrelle 2000
- L'édifiante histoire de green.com (The Edifying Story of Green.com), novel, A Contrario 2004
- Le fils de l'océan (The Son of the Ocean), (for teenagers), Rageot (collection Cascade) 2005
- Le Quatuor de Mélodie (Mélodie's Quatuor), (for teenagers), Pocket jeunesse 2006
- L'homme-horloge (The Clockman), short stories, Le Mercure de France 2006
- Comment je suis devenue grande (How I Grew Up), for children, Rageot 2006
- Ce que je sais d'elle (What I Know of Her), novel, Arléa 2006
