= Hummer (1997 video game) =

1997 Video game

- Developer: Sega AM2
- Publisher: Sega
- Platform: Arcade
- Release: WW: 1997
- Genres: Light gun shooter, first-person shooter, racing
- Modes: Single-player, multiplayer

Hummer is a video game developed by Sega AM2 and published by Sega for the arcade. It is also known as Behind... Enemy Lines.

== Gameplay ==
Hummer is a first-person light-gun game in which the player's hummer drives through the enemy and tries to destroy everything they have.

== Reception ==
Next Generation reviewed the arcade version of the game, rating it two stars out of five, and stated that "Sega's megahit arcade team may crank out lots of great games (and no one does it better), but Hummer [...] is one that definitely fell through the cracks."
