= Hummer (cocktail) =

Ice cream cocktail

- Type: Mixed drink
- Ingredients: 1 light rum; 1 Kahlua; 10-12 ice cubes; 2-4 scoops vanilla ice cream
- Standard garnish: None
- Served: Frozen
- Preparation: Blend ingredients until smooth and serve in a well-chilled tall glass

The Hummer is an ice cream cocktail originally created in Detroit, Michigan, at Bayview Yacht Club by Jerome Adams. It was the first "boozy milkshake" of the late 1960s. It is made with light rum and Kahlua and vanilla ice cream.

Two legendary bartenders have been credited with creating the drink. According to The Detroit Free Press Jerome Adams created the drink at the Bayview Yacht Club in 1967, but in a 1982 article The Free Press said it was invented at the London Chop House by Farouk Elhaje. The original recipe has evolved over the years, with new versions replacing the vanilla ice cream with peppermint, butter pecan or using fresh cream instead of ice cream.

The drink is made strong with nearly 4 ounces of alcohol in a 7.5 ounce glass. The consistency is so thick, made with two scoops of vanilla ice cream, that a straw would stand up straight in the glass. Despite the high alcohol content of the drink, it doesn't taste strongly of alcohol. The price of a pitcher for 10 or 12 was around $90 in 2014.

The Hummer has not seen as much of a resurgence as other classic cocktails like the Last Word because ice cream is considered a difficult ingredient to work with.
