= Cec Hammer =

Australian rules footballer

Personal information
- Born: 24 June 1926
- Died: 1 April 2013 (aged 86)
- Original team: Newtown & Chilwell
- Height: 168 cm (5 ft 6 in)
- Weight: 68 kg (150 lb)

Playing career^{1}
Years	Club	Games (Goals)
1945	Geelong	2 (0)
- ^{1} Playing statistics correct to the end of 1945.

Cec Hammer (24 June 1926 – 1 April 2013) was an Australian rules footballer who played with Geelong in the Victorian Football League (VFL).

Hammer made two appearances for Geelong in the 1945 VFL season, against Carlton at Kardinia Park in round eight and St Kilda at Junction Oval in round nine. He previously played under-18s at Newtown & Chilwell.

A half back flanker, Hammer played in the Tasmanian Football League for North Hobart in 1948 and 1949. He then joined Sandy Bay and in 1952 was a member of their premiership team. In 1953, Hammer represented Tasmania at the Adelaide Carnival.
