= Hammer Lake =

Lake in Ontario, Canada

- Location within Ontario
- Location: Ontario
- Coordinates: 48°24′N 85°6′W
- Basin countries: Canada
- Islands: Seagull Rock, Big Island, N-Tree Island (previously Dead Tree Island)
- Settlements: White River, Wawa

Hammer Lake is a hammer-shaped lake in Alanen Township, Algoma District, Ontario, Canada located between White River and Wawa.

Activities at Hammer Lake include canoeing, fishing, blueberry-picking, swimming, and picnicking. Loons, beavers, and chipmunks are common, and moose are occasionally sighted as well. Mosquitoes are abundant.

There are many privately owned cabins around the lake which have neither electricity nor running water. Inhabitants typically obtain water from the lake and bring in supplies from the nearby towns.

The nearest establishment is the H&C Family Lodge (formerly Hammer Lake Lodge which was owned by Sarah and Stewart Waito), just across the street from the lake. It sells food and supplies, rents out boats and equipment, and lodges visitors to the area.

== See also ==
- List of lakes in Ontario
