= Hammer (Bob Marley song) =

Song by Bob Marley

Song by Bob Marley

from the album Fy-ah, Fy-ah
- Released: 2004
- Recorded: ca. 1968
- Genre: Reggae
- Label: JAD
- Songwriter(s): Bob Marley

"Hammer" is a song by Bob Marley. It was first recorded early in Marley's career (probably 1968) but never appeared on the Bob Marley & The Wailers studio albums in the seventies. JAD Records ultimately released remastered versions of the early studio sessions of Bob Marley & Wailers; "Hammer" is included on Fy-ah, Fy-ah and a Sly and Robbie remix of the song is included on Man To Man. A version of the song also appears on the box-set Songs of Freedom.

The song was covered by Sublime.
