= Hummer (surname) =

Hummer is a surname. Notable people with the surname include:

- Craig Hummer (born 1965), American sports announcer
- Ian Hummer (born 1990), American basketball player
- John Hummer (born 1948), American basketball player
- Julia Hummer (born 1980), German actress and singer
- T. R. Hummer (born 1950), American poet, writer and academic
