= Emanuel Hammer =

American psychologist (1926–2005)

Emanuel Frederick Hammer (August 15, 1926 – May 18, 2005) was an American psychologist and author who studied connections between creativity and criminality via projective tests and art therapy. He founded the Institute for Projective Drawings and served as director of Lincoln Institute of Psychotherapy in New York City. He published 15 books and was a Fellow of the American Psychological Association.

== Life and career ==
Hammer served as an adjunct professor of psychology at the Graduate School of Arts and Science, New York University, a Diplomate in clinical psychology American Board of Professional Psychology and member at the National Association for Psychoanalysis. His early work explored drawing by subjects, especially house-tree-person tests. He also studied sex offenders and hypnosis.

== Selected publications ==
- A comparison of HTP's of rapists and pedophiles (1954)
- Post-hypnotic suggestion and test performance (1954)
- Relationship between diagnosis of psychosexual pathology and the sex of the first drawn person (1954)
- Psychodynamic patterns in sex offenders: A four-factor theory (1957)
- The Clinical Applications of Projective Drawings (1958)
- Advances in projective drawing interpretation
- Creativity: An Exploratory Investigation of the Personalities of Gifted Adolescent Artists
- The house-tree-person (H-T-P) clinical research manual
- Reaching the affect: style in the psychodynamic therapies (1990) ISBN 9780876688182
- Use of Interpretation in Treatment: Technique and Art (1968) ISBN 9780808901723
