= Michael Hammers =

German artist and designer (born 1965)

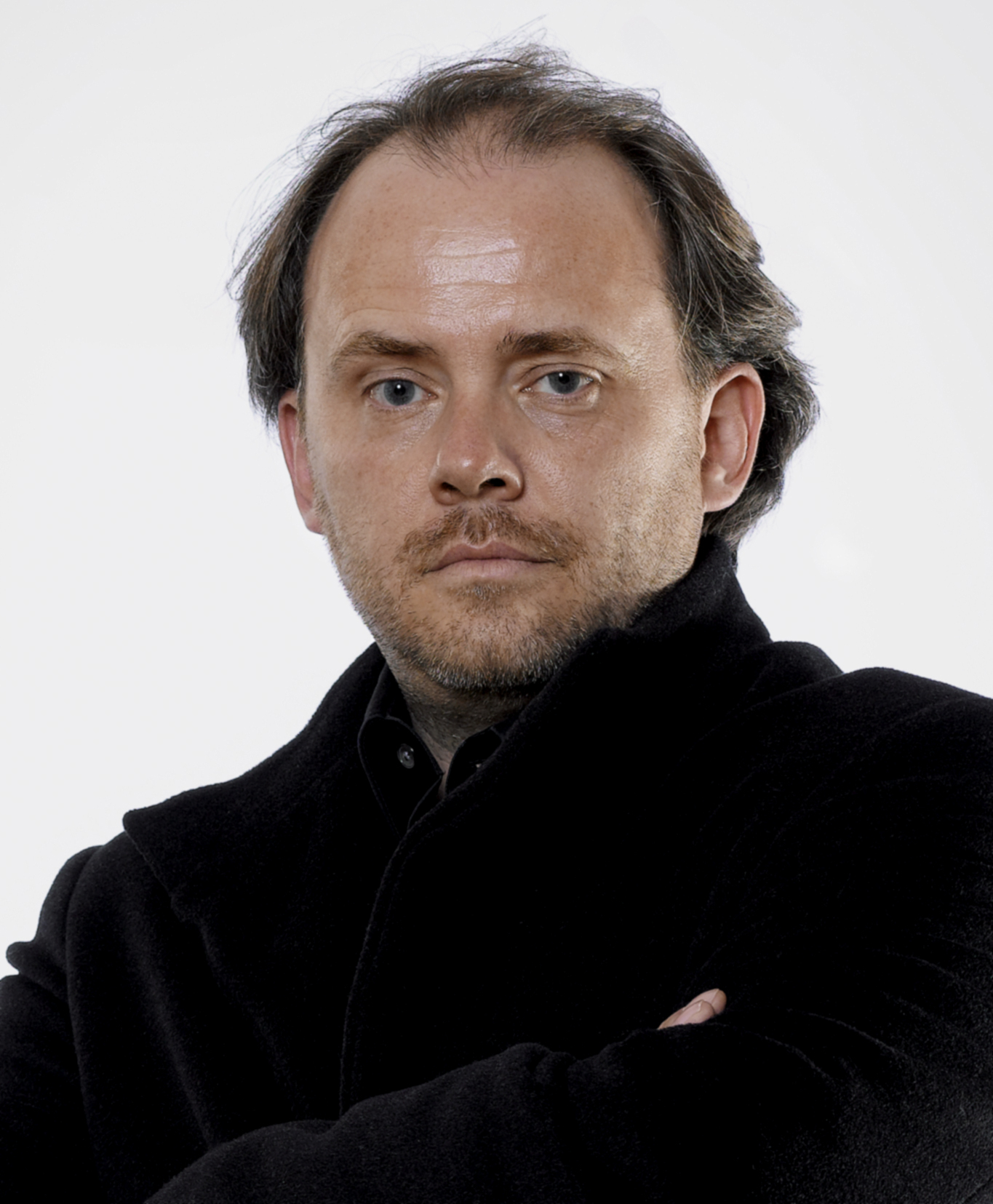

Michael Hammers (born 1 August 1965 in Aachen, West Germany) is a German artist and designer.

== Life ==
Upon passing his school leaving exams, Michael Hammers began his professional career as a blacksmith. He apprenticed in several workshops and studios before becoming the assistant of sculptor Paul Nagel. Hammers’ greatest interest is applied art in architecture. After establishing his own workshop in 1994, Michael Hammers began to artistically pursue the fundamental ideas of the Bauhaus school; breaking down the existing hierarchical structures between various types of formal instruction. Today there are artisans, architects, designers and engineers all working together under the same roof in Michael Hammers Studios.

First and foremost, it is Michael Hammers himself who develops the basic artistic and technical concepts. His materials are metal, stone, wood, glass, light and color.

Starting in 2005, Hammers increasingly turned towards working with audiovisuals. His avandt-garde film From the Infinity of the Cosmos, a homage to Maria Callas, premiered at the Metropolitan Opera in New York in 2007.

In 1984 Hammers passed his school leaving exams at the Kaiser-Karls-Gymnasium in Aachen, Germany before starting his apprenticeship as a blacksmith. He passed the trade test as a wrought-iron craftsman with honors in 1987. In 1989 he joined the studio and workshop of the sculptor Paul Nagel in Wesseling, Germany. In 1992 he passed his examination for the master's certificate as a wrought-iron craftsman and a metal designer. 1994 saw the foundation of the workshop Nagel-Hammers and in 1997 Hammers began with classical vocal training. 2005 was the start of his work as a freelance artist and designer, and the introduction of Michael Hammers' Artmanship . Most recently in 2007 the Michael Hammers Studios GmbH was established. In 2008 Michael Hammers was appointed as a cultural ambassador to the Senate of the Federal Association for Economic Development and Foreign Trade of Germany (BWA). In 2010 the plenum of the Guild of Metalworkers Rhine-Erft, Germany appoints unanimously Michael Hammers honorary member.

== Works ==
- 1996 "Gitterwerk", lattice work at the south entrance of the Cologne Cathedral, designed by Paul Nagel, Cologne
- 1996 "Golgotha Kreuz", Golgotha Crucifix, designed by Paul Nagel, Church of the Holy Sepulchre in Jerusalem
- 2000 "The Millennium Cross of Light", designed by Stefano Ricci, Rome
- 2001 "The World’s Largest Crystal Octahedron", Gemological Institute of America (GIA), San Diego
- 2002 "Northern Lights", Swarovski Crystal Worlds, Wattens, Austria
- 2004 "The Swarovski Star", Rockefeller Center Christmas Tree, New York
- 2005 "Voyage", designed by Yves Béhar, Swarovski Crystal Palace, Milan, Italy
- 2005 "Joie", Crystal Waterfall, Top of The Rock, Rockefeller Center, New York
- 2005 "Radiance", Crystal Geode, Top of The Rock, Rockefeller Center, New York
- 2006 "Goldene Wand", Golden Wall at Festival Hall, Salzburg, Austria
- 2006 "Swarovski Gallery", Rockefeller Center, New York
- 2007 "Infinity of the Cosmos", avant-garde film on the life of Maria Callas, Metropolitan Opera House, New York
- 2008 "Electric Fountain", designed by Tim Noble and Sue Webster, Rockefeller Center, New York
- 2009 "Crystal Wall Beijing", World Financial Center, Beijing, People's Republic of China
- 2009 "Rockefeller Center Christmas Tree", "The Swarovski Star", lighting production, New York
- 2010 "City Museum Bruck ", exhibition concept and design, Bruck an der Mur, Austria
Electric Fountain, Rockefeller Plaza, NYC

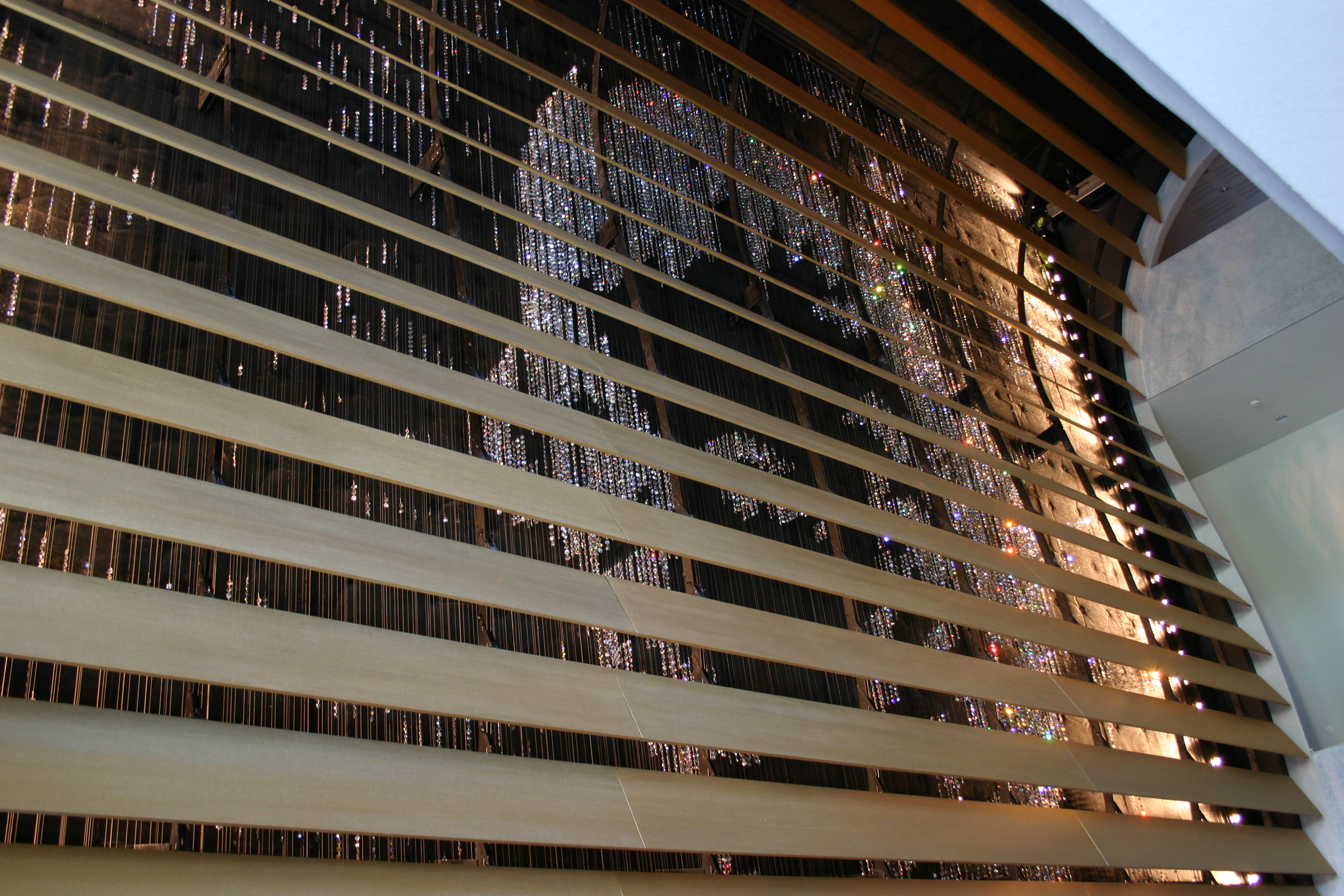
Golden Wall at Festival Hall, Salzburg, Austria

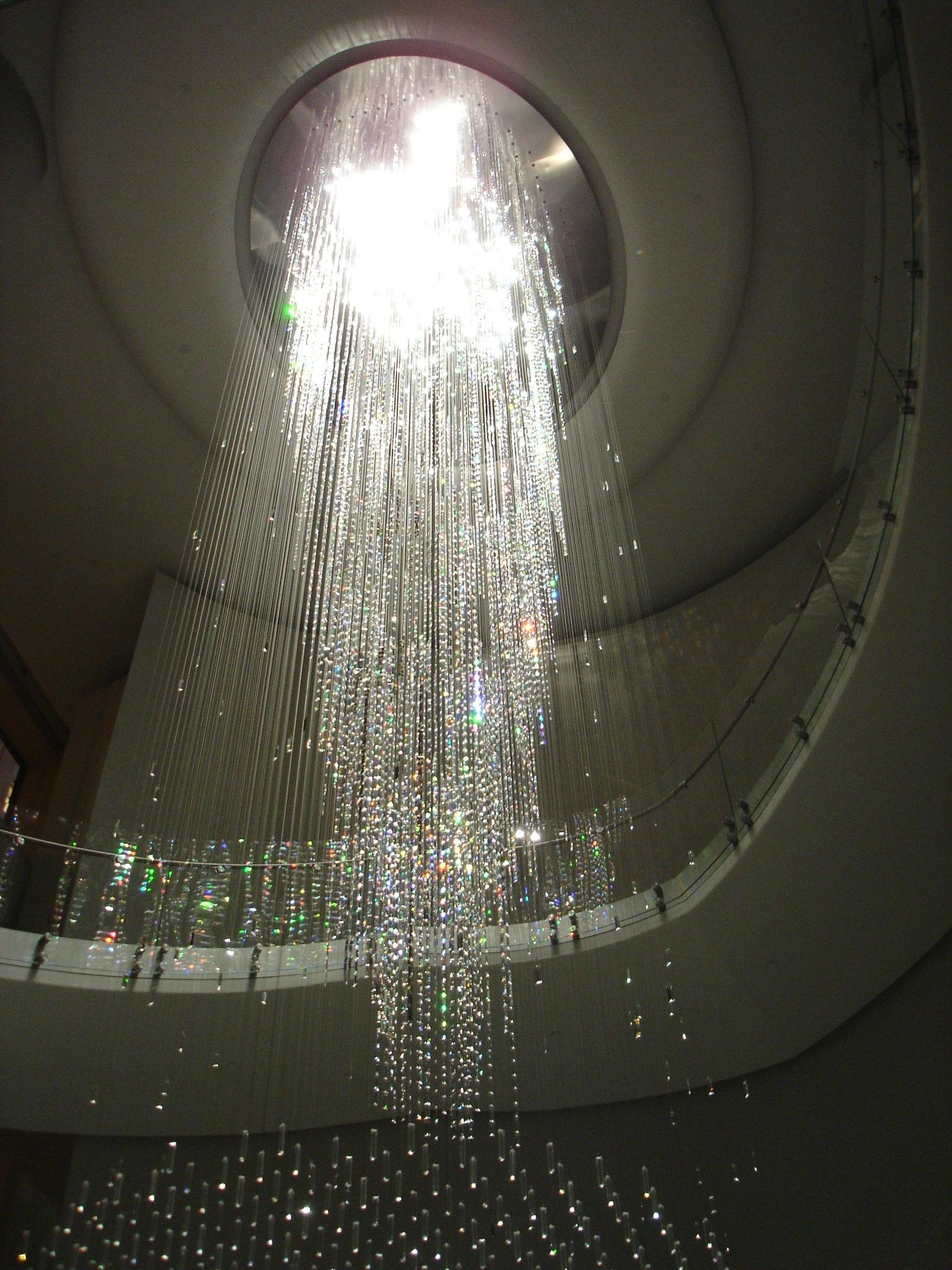
Joie, crystal waterfall, Rockefeller Center

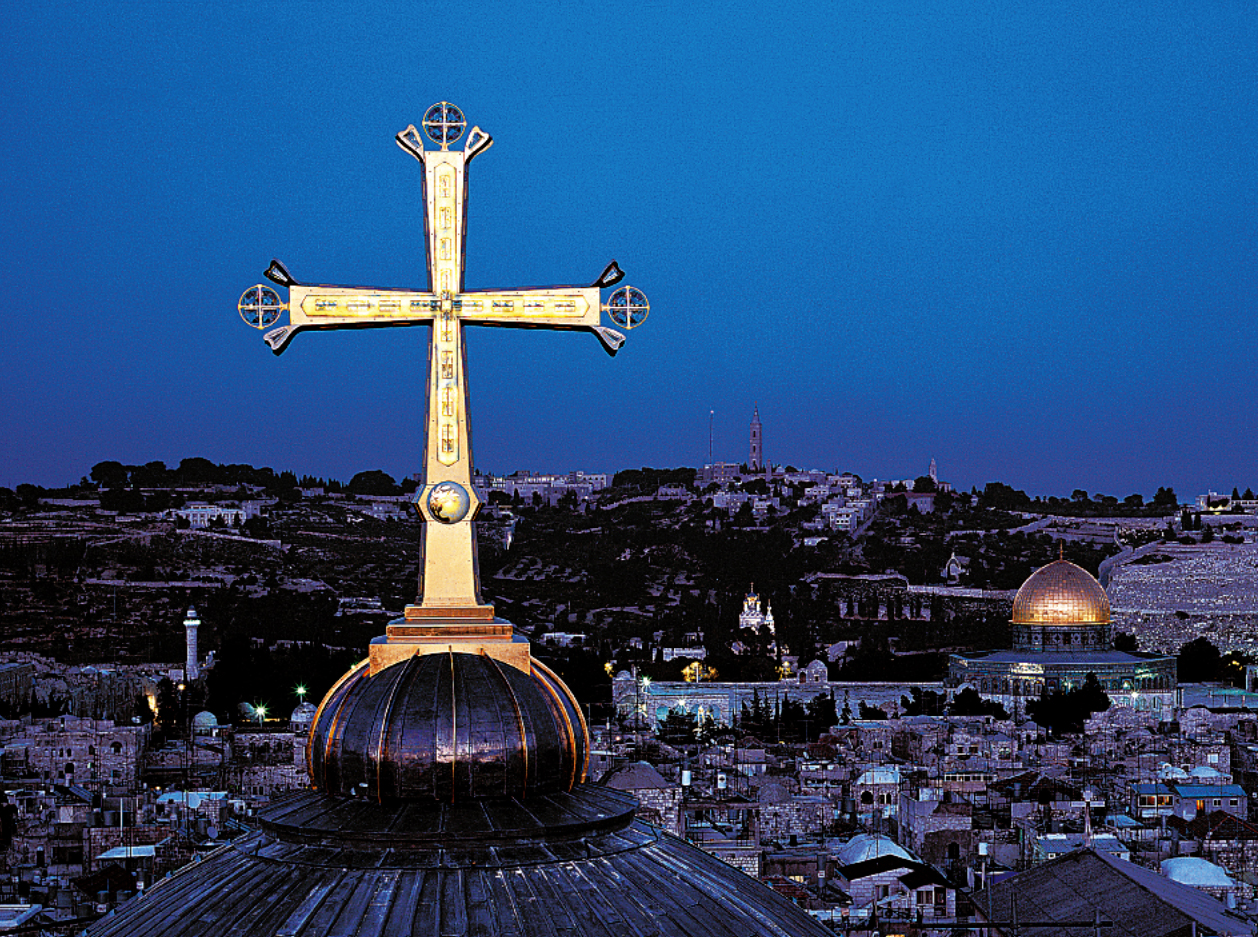
Golgotha Crucifix, Church of the Holy Sepulchre in Jerusalem

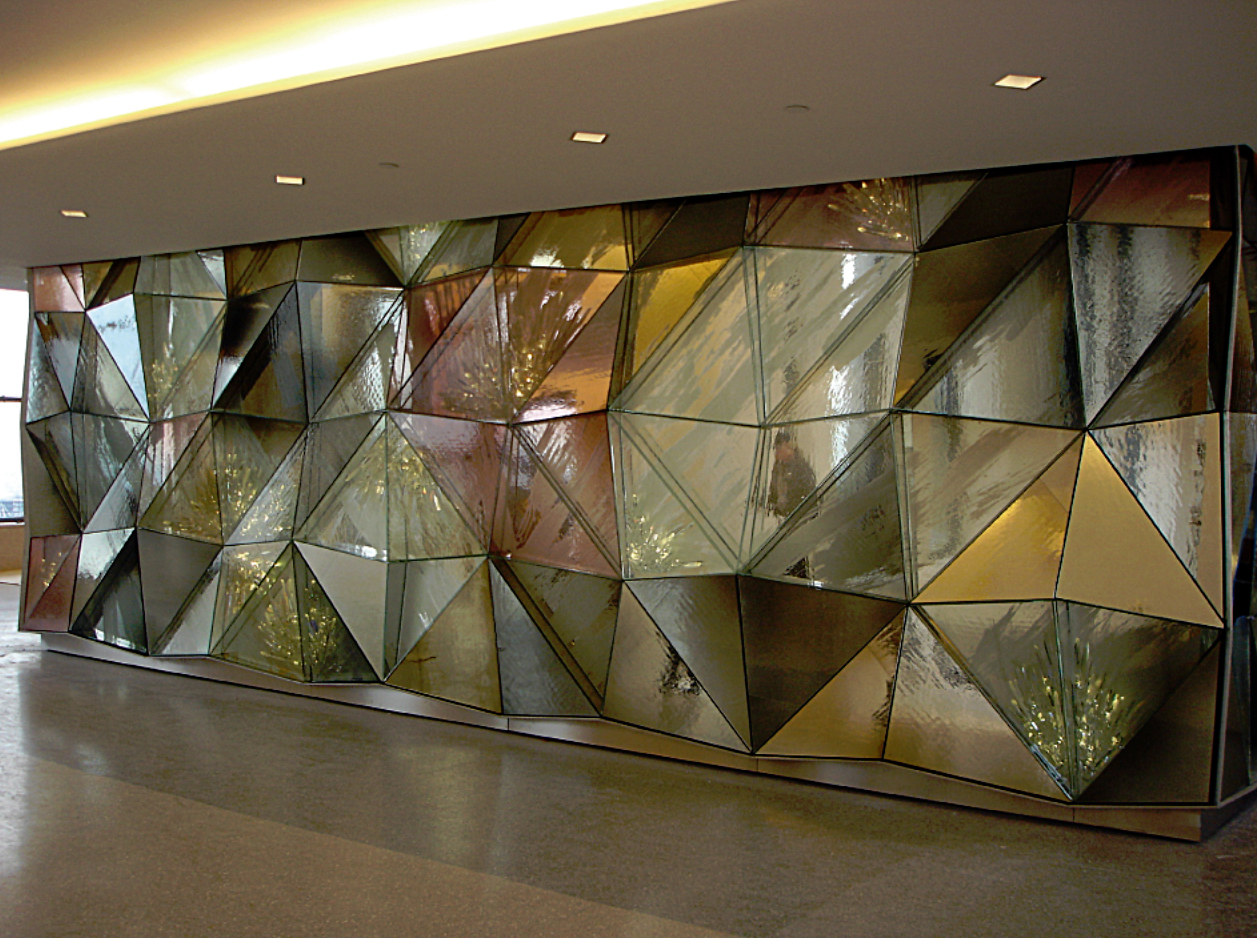
Geode, crystal wall, Rockefeller Center

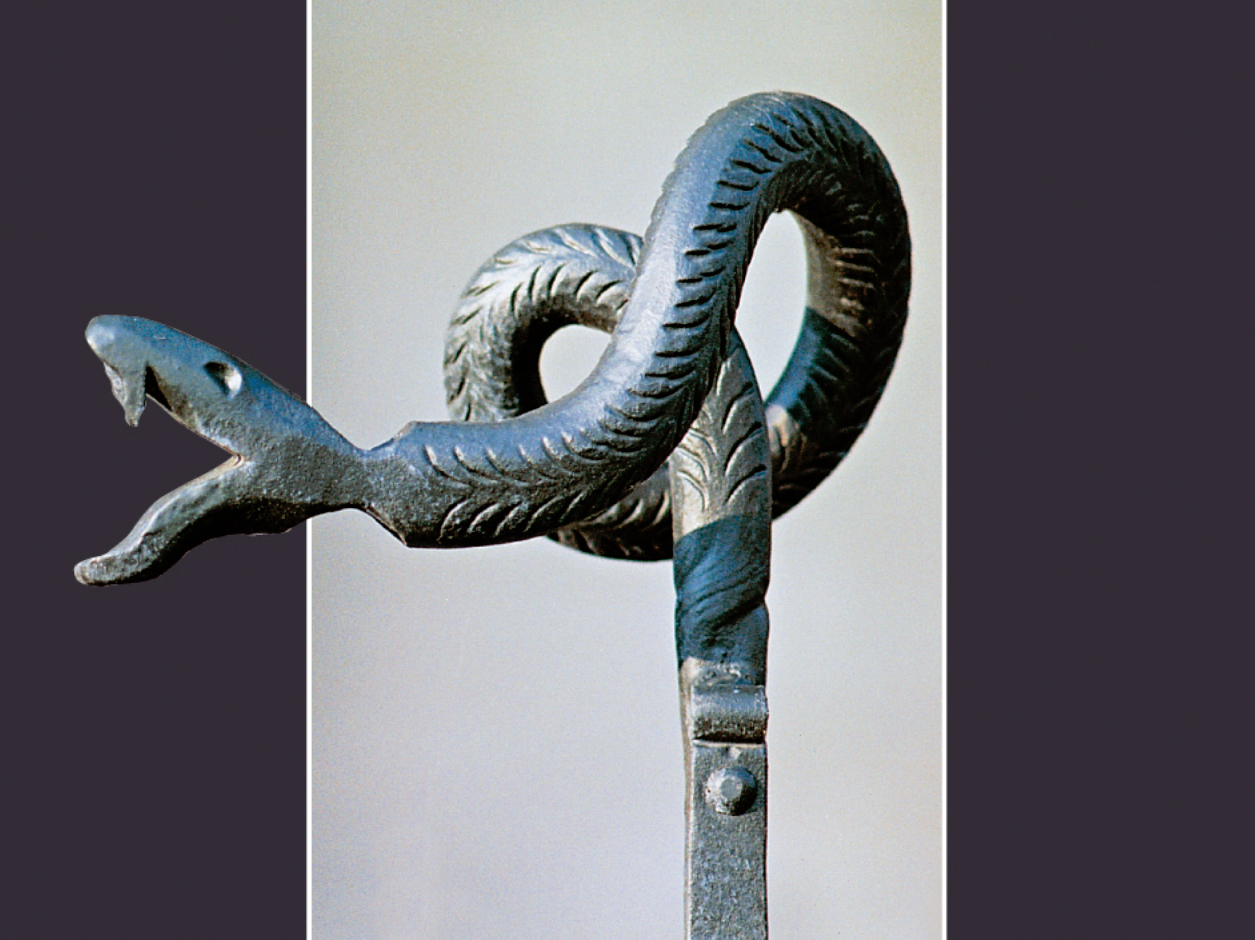
"Gitterwerk", lattice work at the Cologne Cathedral
