= The Hammer (radio personality) =

Canadian radio host

- Born: Matthew Wreggitt; Sault Ste. Marie, Ontario, Canada
- Education: Loyalist College
- Known for: Z103.5

Matthew Wreggitt, commonly known as The Hammer (sometimes stylized as The HammeR), is a Canadian radio personality known for his work on Z103.5.

== Life and career ==
Born in Sault Ste. Marie, Ontario, Wreggit grew up in Brantford, Ontario and Waterford, Ontario before moving to Toronto to pursue a career in media. He graduated from Loyalist College with a degree in broadcasting.

He joined CIDC-FM (commonly known currently as Z103.5, and previously known as Hot103.5) in 1997 as a programming and promotions assistant. He eventually became a regular radio host, becoming notable for hosting the Afternoon Drive. He was named the winner of the 2015 International Music Director of the Year Award. In 2020, he was named the radio station's Program Director.
