= Großes Festspielhaus =

Opera house in Salzburg, Austria

Coordinates: 47°47′55″N 13°02′28″E

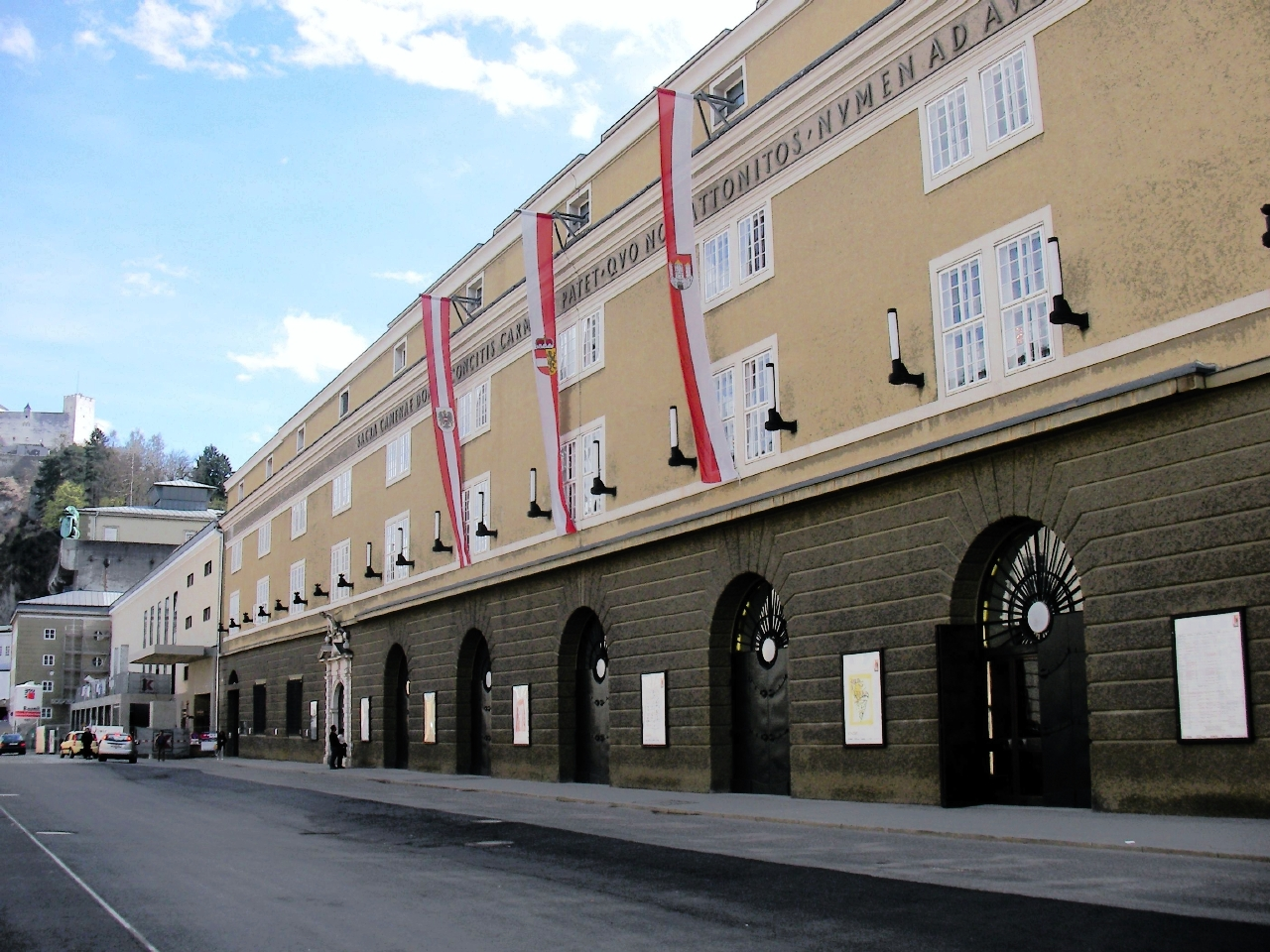
Entrance from Hofstallgasse

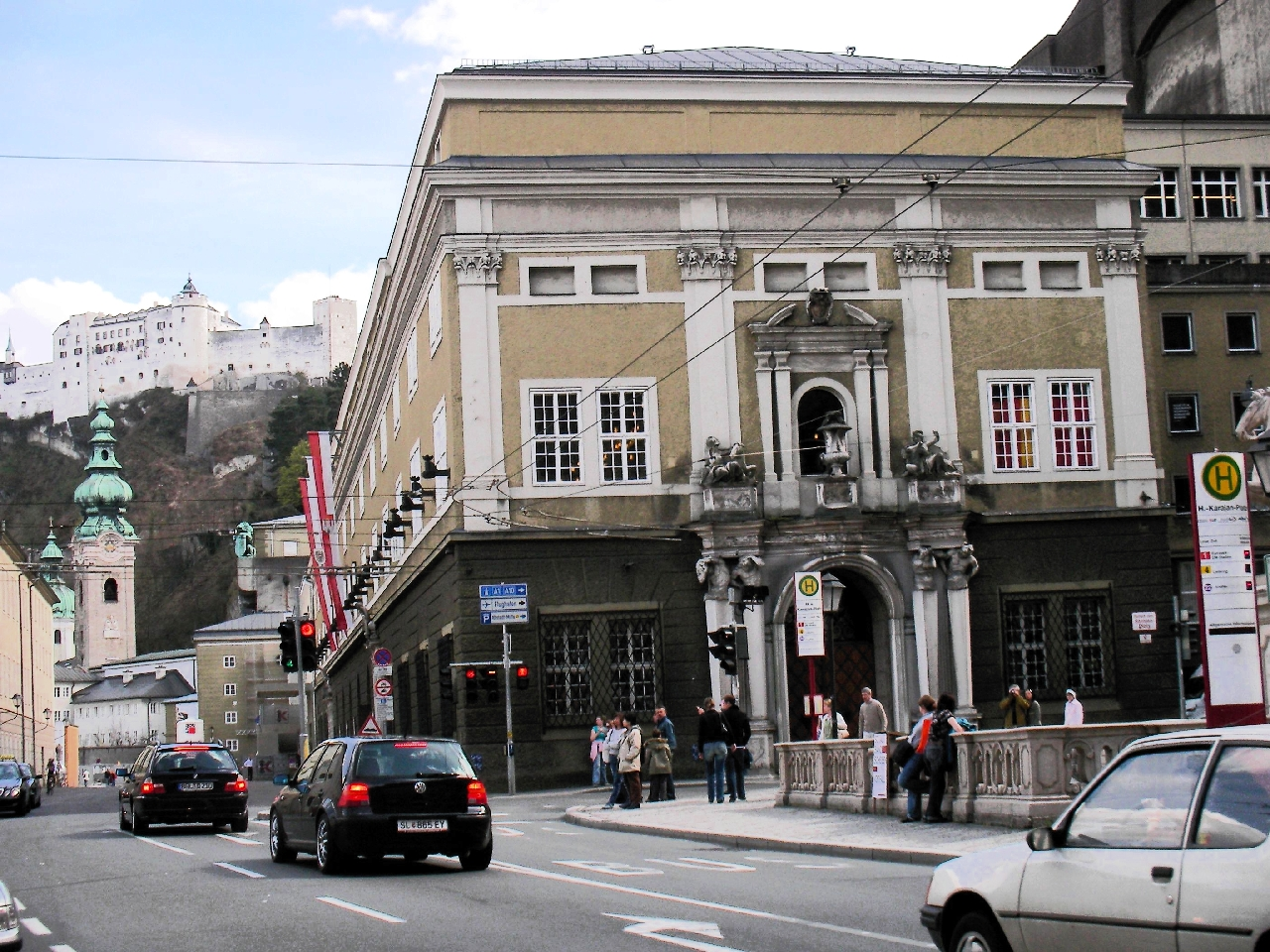
The front from Herbert von Karajan-square

The Großes Festspielhaus (Large Festival House), is an Austrian opera theatre house, that in its current form, was designed by architect Clemens Holzmeister in 1956 to host the Salzburg Festival..

== History ==
It was inaugurated on 26 July 1960 with a performance of Richard Strauss' Der Rosenkavalier conducted by Herbert von Karajan, who also worked with Holzmeister on aspects of the building's design. The Large Festival House includes office space and tunneling into the Mönchsberg as well as a 2,179-seat performance space adaptable for both scenic and non-scenic events and acoustically scalable down for piano and song recitals.

The stage is one of the widest in the world, at 100 metres (330 ft).

The auditorium is square. Access from the street to the lobby is through five bronze doors, above which is inscribed a Latin motto by Thomas Michels: SACRA CAMENAE DOMUS / CONCITIS CARMINE PATET / QUO NOS ATTONITOS / NUMEN AD AURAS FERAT (The Muse's holy house is open to those moved by song / divine power may bear us up who are inspired).

== See also ==
- List of opera houses
- List of opera festivals
