= Emerson Hammer =

American politician (1856–1940)

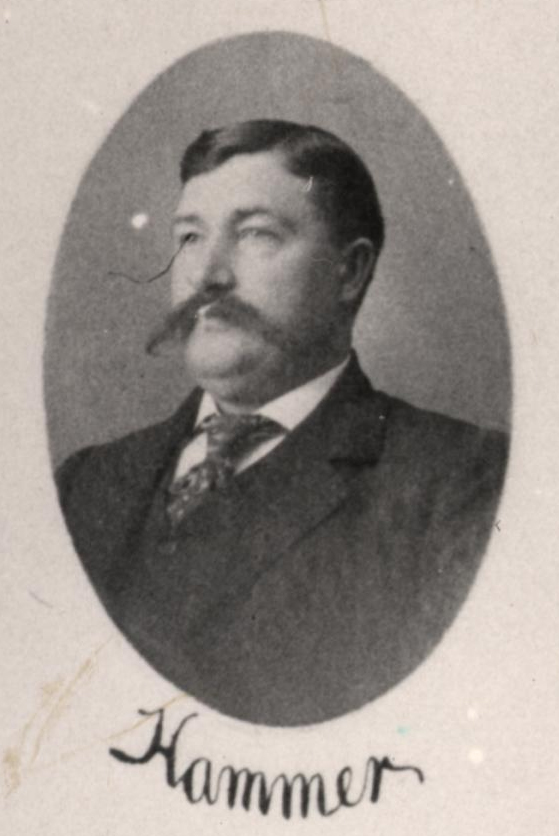
- Hammer in 1901

Member of the Washington State Senate for the 32nd district
- In office 1899–1903

Member of the Washington State Senate for the 40th district
- In office 1903–1907; 1911–1915

Personal details
- Born: August 12, 1856 Montpelier, Indiana, United States
- Died: March 6, 1940 (aged 83) Sedro Woolley, Washington, United States
- Party: Republican

Emerson Hammer (August 12, 1856 – March 6, 1940) was an American politician in the state of Washington. He served in the Washington State Senate from 1901 to 1903.
