= Salzburg Easter Festival =

Classical music and opera festival

Salzburg Easter Festival Osterfestspiele Salzburg
- Genre: Classical music; Opera
- Begins: Palm Sunday weekend (moveable)
- Ends: Easter Monday (moveable)
- Frequency: Annual
- Venue: Salzburg Grand Festival Theatre; International Mozarteum Foundation; Felsenreitschule
- Locations: Salzburg, Austria
- Inaugurated: 1967; 59 years ago
- Founder: Herbert von Karajan
- Leader: Nikolaus Bachler
- Website: www.osterfestspiele.at

The Salzburg Easter Festival (German: Osterfestspiele Salzburg, sometimes OFS) is a classical music and opera festival held every year over the extended week before Easter (Holy Week) in Salzburg, Austria since 1967.

It was created by the conductor Herbert von Karajan, and for most of its history featured the Berlin Philharmonic, of which Karajan was chief conductor; his successors in Berlin, Claudio Abbado and Simon Rattle, succeeded him in Salzburg as well. The orchestra and Rattle left in 2013, and were replaced between 2013 and 2022 by the Dresden Staatskapelle and Christian Thielemann. The Berlin Philharmonic returned as the resident orchestra in 2026, with its chief conductor Kirill Petrenko. Since 2022, the artistic director has been Nikolaus Bachler.

Each edition includes the production of an opera and a series of orchestral and choral concerts, as well as a complementary programme of performances in other formats.

The Easter Festival is independent from the organization which produces the (summertime) Salzburg Festival and the Salzburg Whitsun Festival.

== History ==
=== Foundation ===
The Salzburg Easter Festival was a creation of the conductor Herbert von Karajan. After his 1964 resignation as director of the Vienna State Opera, to where he would not return until 1977, he decided to no longer take charge of a traditional opera company, avoiding the constraints of having to deliver a full season and to oversee a large, conflict-prone organization. His intent, which he credits to a suggestion from Christoph von Dohnányi, was to produce opera in conditions which granted him complete control over music, stage direction, and management, and enabled him enough focus to achieve his designs with the highest possibly quality.

This was to be with the Berlin Philharmonic, of which he was the chief conductor since 1955. Unlike their counterparts of a number of major orchestras of the German-speaking lands which serve as the pit orchestra of their city’s opera house, for example the Vienna Philharmonic, the Berlin Philharmonic exclusively performed in concert at the time.

According to Karajan’s recollections, he initially thought that the newly reconstructed Grand Theatre in Geneva was suitable for his enterprise. However, he realized during rehearsals of Boris Godunov for the 1965 Salzburg Festival that the large stage and modern facilities of the Grand Festival Theatre, recently built at his initiative, made it the ideal venue. A Salzburg native, he lived with his family in nearby Anif.

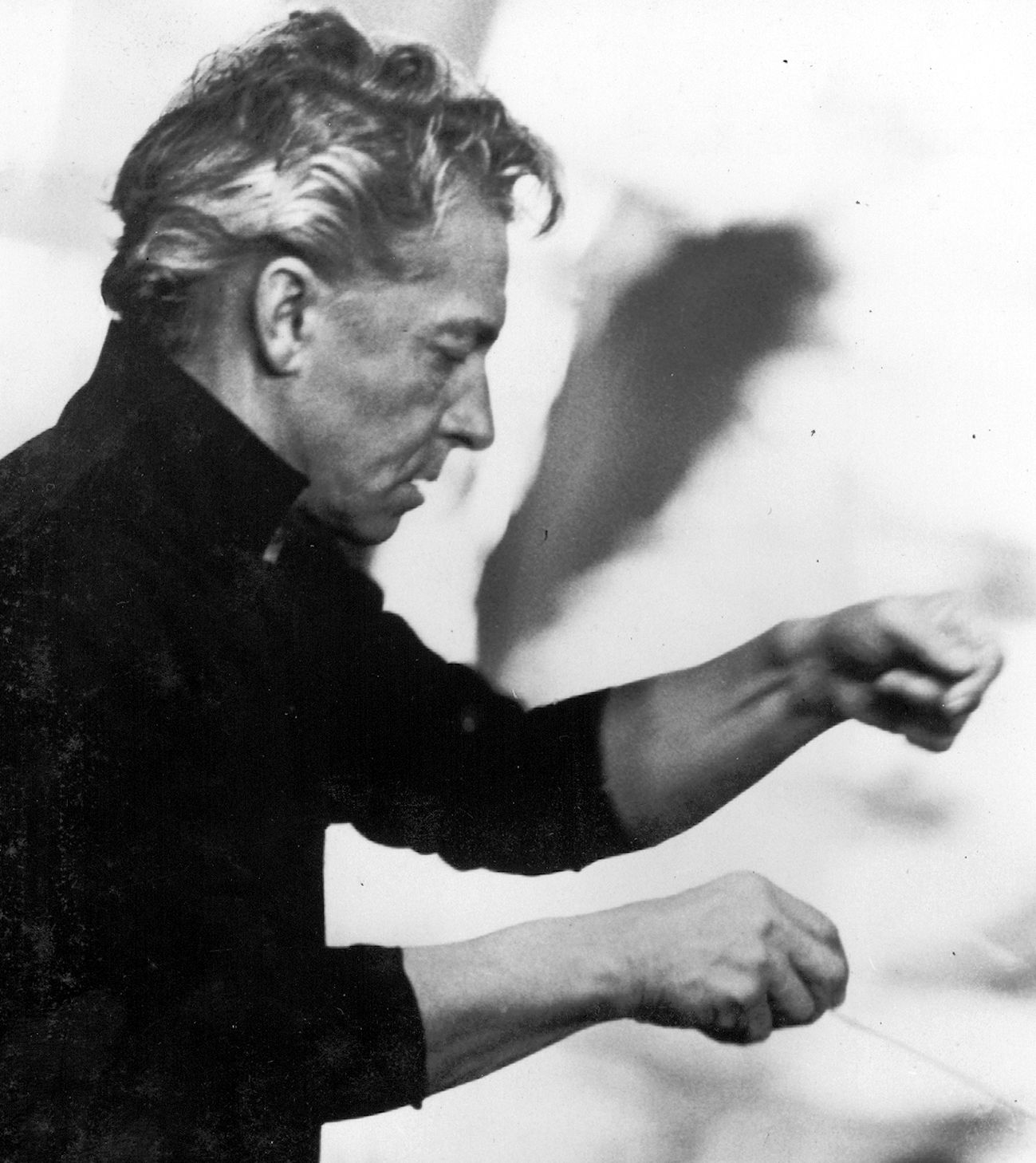
Herbert von Karajan conducting in the early 1970s.

The new festival was to fit into the “Karajan system”, under which he combined his several positions and partnerships for complete artistic and financial independence. It would work without government subsidy, and although Karajan would act as manager, producer, funder, sole conductor, and stage director, he would ask for no pay. For each edition, the opera would be recorded in studio in Berlin the previous autumn, for one of the three record labels with which Karajan was under contract (Decca, Deutsche Grammophon, EMI), and which he could put in competition in order to obtain the best possible terms. Commercially, this meant that part of the preparation work for the festival would be paid for by the label. It also enabled the orchestra to limit its presence in Salzburg in the middle of its Berlin season; being a corporation of the city-state at the time, it obtained the permission of West Berlin authorities, on the argument that it would promote the city’s international reputation. Artistically, this meant that the musical performance was fully ready long before the short festival, and that the conductor, orchestra and cast avoided doing the bulk of their preparation in a few hasty rehearsals immediately before the festival opened, and could concentrate on the staging when they reconvened in Salzburg. (Note: Since his work with the Philharmonia Orchestra and the producer Walter Legge, Karajan had already taken on the habit to record music works before conducting them in concert, in order to achieve maximal quality on the first public performance, rather than to work out and perfect his interpretation in concert before committing it to the record, as is usual for a number of artists.) The singers left Berlin with a recording of the full orchestral parts, which enabled them to rehearse in the meantime with more precision and comfort than with a piano accompaniment. Karajan also used the studio tapes when he began to work on sets and stage effects at the theatre. The recording were released in the spring at the same time as the festival, both contributing to the promotion of the other.

The Easter Festival was in complement to the Salzburg Festival in the summer, of which Karajan was artistic director since 1957. The Vienna Philharmonic traditionally occupies the place of honour at the summer festival; the Berlin Philharmonic had first performed there only in 1957, brought in by Karajan. Karajan’s initial focus was the works of Richard Wagner, which were avoided in Salzburg in the summer due to a gentlemen’s agreement with the nearby Bayreuth Festival held at the same time. Karajan had conducted in Bayreuth in 1951 and 1952 when the festival reopened after the war, but found its working methods incompatible with the model of music-making he started to develop at this stage of his career.

The first edition opened on 19 March 1967 (Palm Sunday).

=== Karajan era ===
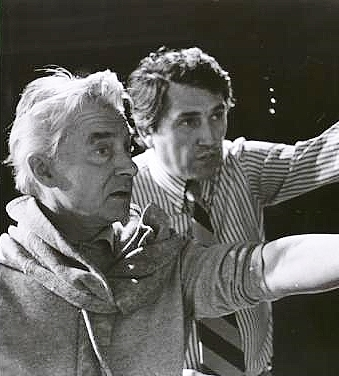
Herbert von Karajan and Günther Schneider-Siemssen, who designed the sets of the 1967–1970 Ring, during a rehearsal.

Karajan’s first endeavour was a production of Richard Wagner’s four-part Der Ring des Nibelungen over the first four editions, starting in 1967 with Die Walküre, the popular second part. The Ring had already been his first stage production in Vienna in 1957, and this made it possible to negotiate a lucrative recording deal from Deutsche Grammophon, as the label was eager to compete with Decca’s recently-completed recording under Georg Solti, the first studio recording of the full cycle. This was Karajan’s first studio recording of a Wagner opera, after three decades conducting them.

The festival reached budget balance on its first edition, even managing to turn a quasi-symbolic profit (given in different sources as 50 schilling or 300 schilling), which Karajan took as his only fee. Another way to fund the festival was co-productions, reviving Karajan’s idea of a pool of major opera houses, attempted when he started a partnership between the Vienna State Opera and the Teatro alla Scala. The inaugural Ring was announced as a co-production with the New York Metropolitan Opera; however, only Die Walküre and Das Rheingold ended up performed in New York in the winter following the Salzburg premiere as expected, with Karajan in the pit with the Metropolitan Opera Orchestra. Due to a strike, Siegfried (1969 edition) was presented only in 1972 with the recording main cast, but conducted by Erich Leinsdorf.

The Easter Festival benefited from the star appeal of Karajan and the Berlin Philharmonic, which was at its highest during the 1960s and 1970s. As it needed to be privately funded, it heavily relied on an affluent international audience, to which it granted exclusive access; membership of the Association of Patrons was almost indispensable to obtain tickets, despite their high price. It was at the time the only opportunity to hear an opera played by the Berlin Philharmonic. Karajan conducted every single opera and concert performance for almost two decades, and also staged the operas himself, except in 1975 (La bohème by Franco Zeffirelli) and 1987. The music critic Joachim Kaiser wrote of his original Walküre that it was “self-cast, self-financed, self-staged, self-conducted — that Wagner composed the piece almost seems like a blemish”. His wife Eliette von Karajan acted as an unofficial hostess at the festival, and was usually the last to take her front-row seat jus as the lights went down.

Wagner was the main focus of “Karajan’s counter-Bayreuth” (Robert C. Bachmann) in the first years of the festival. He ended up producing the entire Bayreuth canon, concluding in 1982, with the exception of Tannhäuser, for lack of a tenor he felt suitable for the title role. All his studio recordings of Wagner’s operas, except for an earlier recording of Die Meistersinger von Nürnberg, were part of Salzburg productions; he never recorded Tannhäuser in the studio. He had initially envisioned that when the inaugural Ring was completed, subsequent editions would enable him to perform two entire cycles, or one cycle and another opera for two or three evenings, with a few concerts in complement. In the event, it became customary to simply perform one opera at every edition. Apart from Wagner’s, these were from the core of Karajan’s lyric repertoire, especially by Giuseppe Verdi and Giacomo Puccini, with a few revivals; however, operas by Wolfgang Amadeus Mozart and Richard Strauss remained reserved to the summer festival. The orchestra and choral concerts featured works Karajan frequently conducted in Berlin or on tour, most by Ludwig van Beethoven, Johannes Brahms, Anton Bruckner, Mozart, and Strauss; this made it possible to minimize on-site rehearsals, and the concerts were sometimes preceded by a studio recording, as for the opera.

Karajan’s stagings favoured a romantic, naturalistic, illustrative style, which stood in contrast with the new interpretations and social criticism brought about in Bayreuth by Wieland Wagner until his death in 1966, and by the guest directors thereafter invited by his brother Wolfgang Wagner as part of the “Bayreuth workshop”.

In 1973, Salzburg Whitsun Concerts (now the Salzburg Whitsun Festival) were created by Karajan over Pentecost weekend, intended for people who could not obtain tickets for the Easter Festival. At the time, these were a short cycle of three concerts. They were taken over by the organization behind the summer festival in 1998.

Karajan, who was enthusiastic about new recording technologies and had started to film opera in studio, formed the design to produce his Salzburg Ring. The orchestral parts for Das Rheingold were recorded during the 1973 festival on the occasion of a revival of the 1968 stage production, but the shooting sessions could take place only five years later in a Munich studio, with a partly different cast. (Singers lip synced.) The project proved too costly to continue.

The Easter Festival was increasingly criticized from the mid-1970s, as the lack of appropriate singers and the rising costs delayed the production of new Wagner operas and forced the revival of productions from the summer festival, including the fifteen-year-old Il trovatore, leaving it with little of an artistic line apart from Karajan’s central presence. His complete control decided René Kollo to leave over creative differences after his first performance in the title role of the 1976 Lohengrin, followed by Karl Ridderbusch. Despite his initial insistence on independence, Karajan resorted to subsidies from the state and city government from 1969, which he defended by pointing out the benefits to the local economy. In the face of public criticism and as government representatives started questioning the management and future of the festival, he again renounced their support in 1982. The music critic Reinhard Beuth lamented the “bankruptcy of an idea” in 1978: “The private company has to be subsidised, the Wagner festival became Italian stagione, and festival standards sunk to repertory level. With the transfer of Verdi’s Don Carlo from the summer repertoire to next year’s Easter Festival, the last remnant of independence and significance will be gone.”

The world presentation of the compact disc (CD) took place during the Easter Festival on 15 April 1981, at a press conference of Akio Morita and Norio Ohga (Sony), Joop van Tilburg (Philips), and Richard Busch (PolyGram), in the presence of Karajan who praised the new format.

As Karajan’s health declined in the 1980s, he started delegating some of his many duties: one of the concerts had a guest conductor from 1985, starting with Klaus Tennstedt that year, and the 1987 production of Don Giovanni was staged by Michael Hampe.

=== Abbado and Rattle directorships ===
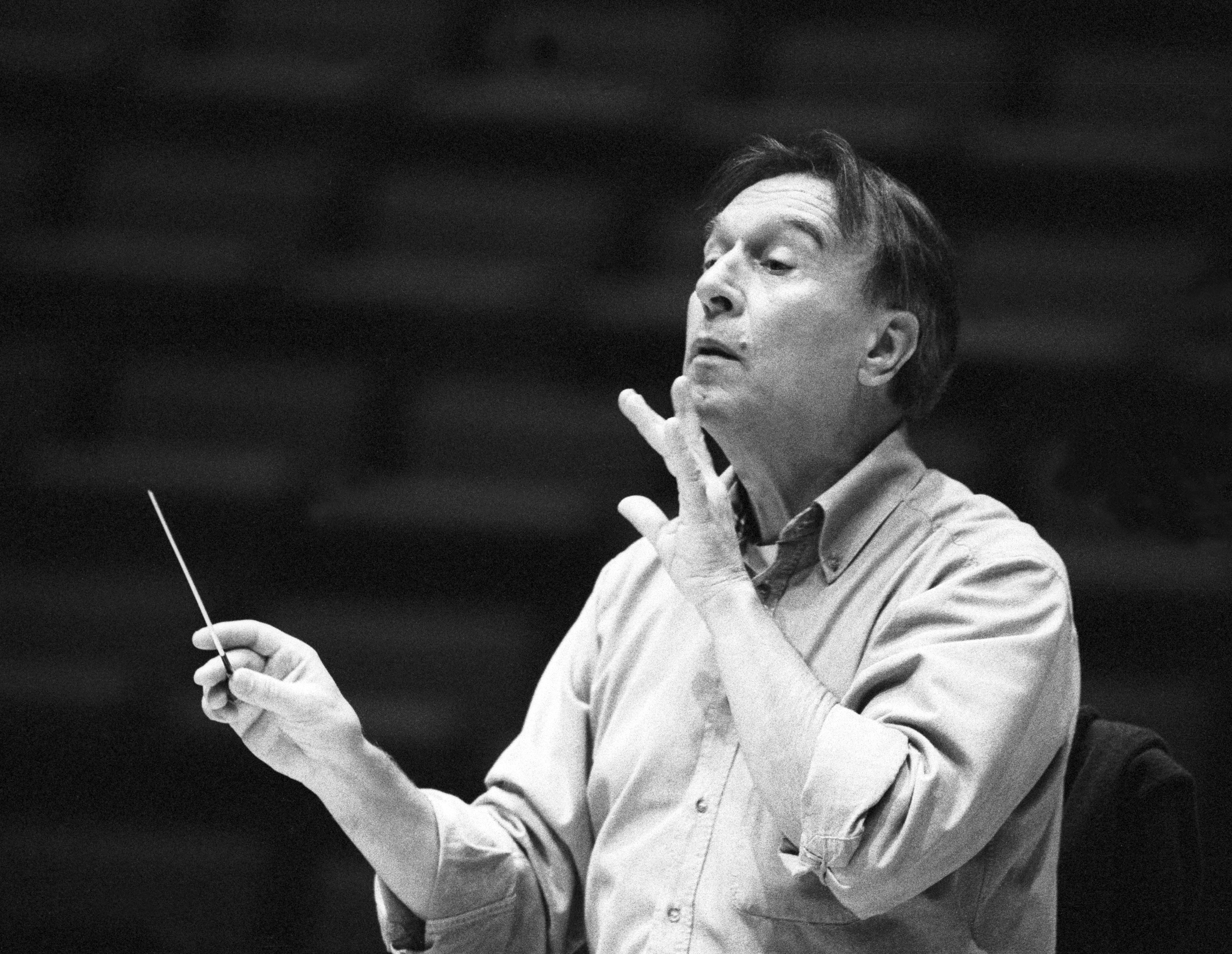
Claudio Abbado in 1994

The 1989 edition saw Karajan’s last appearance in an orchestra pit and his last with the Berlin Philharmonic: he resigned as their chief conductor after the festival, and died in July. Claudio Abbado was elected to succeed him in Berlin. However, the Salzburg Easter Festival functioned separately for a few years: Kurt Masur conducted in 1990 (exceptionally with the Leipzig Gewandhaus Orchestra, of which he was chief conductor, and the Vienna Philharmonic) and Bernard Haitink in 1991 (again with the Berlin Philharmonic), before Georg Solti served as artistic director in 1992 and 1993. Only in 1994 did Abbado succeed to Karajan’s Salzburg role.

Stage directors invited under Abbado delivered more modern productions than Karajan’s traditional style, although the audience made the festival unfit for a full commitment to Regieoper. This was especially under the influence of Gerard Mortier, who had succeeded Karajan at the summer festival, and demanded to approve the productions which were to be performed, and to a large part funded, by his own festival. Although Abbado and Mortier had similar views (both modernists, both keen on thematic programming), they came in conflict when both festivals announced separate productions of Elektra for 1995, forcing Mortier to postpone his. Abbado’s first edition featured a well-remembered production of Boris Godunov by Herbert Wernicke, which drew political parables with Soviet history. After a chamber music concert was trialed in 1989, Abbado also created a chamber music and contemporary music series, then called Kontrapunkte (“Counterpoints”), featuring members of the Berlin Philharmonic and guest soloists and singers, at the Mozarteum. Also experimented were a lied recital in 1992, a children’s concert (Peter and the Wolf) in 1998, and a jazz concert with Thomas Quasthoff in 2002. The Gustav Mahler Jugendorchester and Mahler Chamber Orchestra, both founded by Abbado, were invited several times for a special concert.

Simon Rattle succeeded Abbado in Berlin at the start of the 2002–2003 season, and directed his first Salzburg Easter Festival in 2003, with a production of Fidelio. In 2007–2010, the festival featured its second production of the Ring, staged by Stéphane Braunschweig and co-produced with the Aix-en-Provence Festival on the occasion of the opening of the new Grand Théâtre de Provence; the operas were premiered by Rattle and the Berlin Philharmonic in Aix, and were performed in Salzburg the following Easter. Additions to the traditional programme under Rattle’s directorship included regular jazz concerts, and special performances of a baroque opera conducted by Emmanuelle Haïm, who had been his assistant (Marc-Antoine Charpentier’s David et Jonathas in 2004, George Frideric Handel’s La resurrezione in 2009).

Abbado introduced the custom of giving concert performances of the operas in Berlin before Salzburg as part of the preparation process, since they were no longer recorded in advance as in Karajan’s time, except for the 1994 Boris Godunov and the 2001 Falstaff. The concert performance opened a thematic series of performances in Berlin, for example Shakespeare in 1995–1996 with Otello or “Love and Death” in 1998–1999 with Tristan and Isolde. This was also in consideration to the Berlin audience, as the orchestra was until 2001 overseen and funded by the city-state government. The Berlin performances were moved after Easter in Rattle’s time.

The actress Isabel Karajan, the conductor’s daughter, performed at the 2011 and 2015 festivals.

=== Financial scandal and departure of the Berlin Philharmonic ===
A financial and political scandal erupted in 2009–2010 when Michaël Dewitte, the general manager, and Klaus Kretschmer, the technical director of the summer festival, were accused of embezzling funds: Dewitte was accused of irregularities in up to 1,5 million euros of spendings, and Kretschmer and a company to which he was linked were paid more than 2,400,000 euros over nine years for a number of services and consulting although the Easter Festival had a separate agreement with the summer festival supposed to cover it, and his managers had not authorized it. Part of the sums involved consisted in excessive and discretionary spendings which appeared in company accounts, leading to accusations of improper supervision by government authorities, especially the state governor Gabriele Burgstaller, who was ex officio the executive president of the foundation which supports the festival, and as such held the decision-making votes in the governing body of the company which organizes it. An investigation by the State Court of Audit pointed out a number of mismanagement issues as well as conflicts of interest between the company, the foundation, and the patrons association, which had no practical independence from each other. Dewitte and Kretschmer, the latter severely injured during the scandal after a reported suicide attempt, were dismissed, and were later sentenced on criminal charges; they served time in prison, and had to pay more than 2 million euros in damage to the festival. The company was restructured, with an increased involvement of the state and city governments, and the formation of a Board of Supervisors. Peter Alward, the former head of EMI Classics, took over as general manager in 2010.

The Berlin Philharmonic received competing proposals to transfer their Easter residency to the Festspielhaus Baden-Baden, Germany’s largest opera house, which offered funds for four opera performances per edition and an expansion of the chamber music and educational programmes, while the Salzburg management stated that it had no realistic financial perspective to do so. They considered leaving Salzburg in 2009, with Simon Rattle’s support to the proposal, but a majority of the orchestra voted against the move. Following the scandal, they announced in May 2011 that they would withdraw after the 2012 edition, and transfer to a new Baden-Baden Easter Festival, with broadly the same format. A co-production deal had been announced in April 2011 with Madrid’s Teatro Real for the 2011 to 2013 productions, but fell through.

=== Thielemann and the Staatskapelle Dresden ===
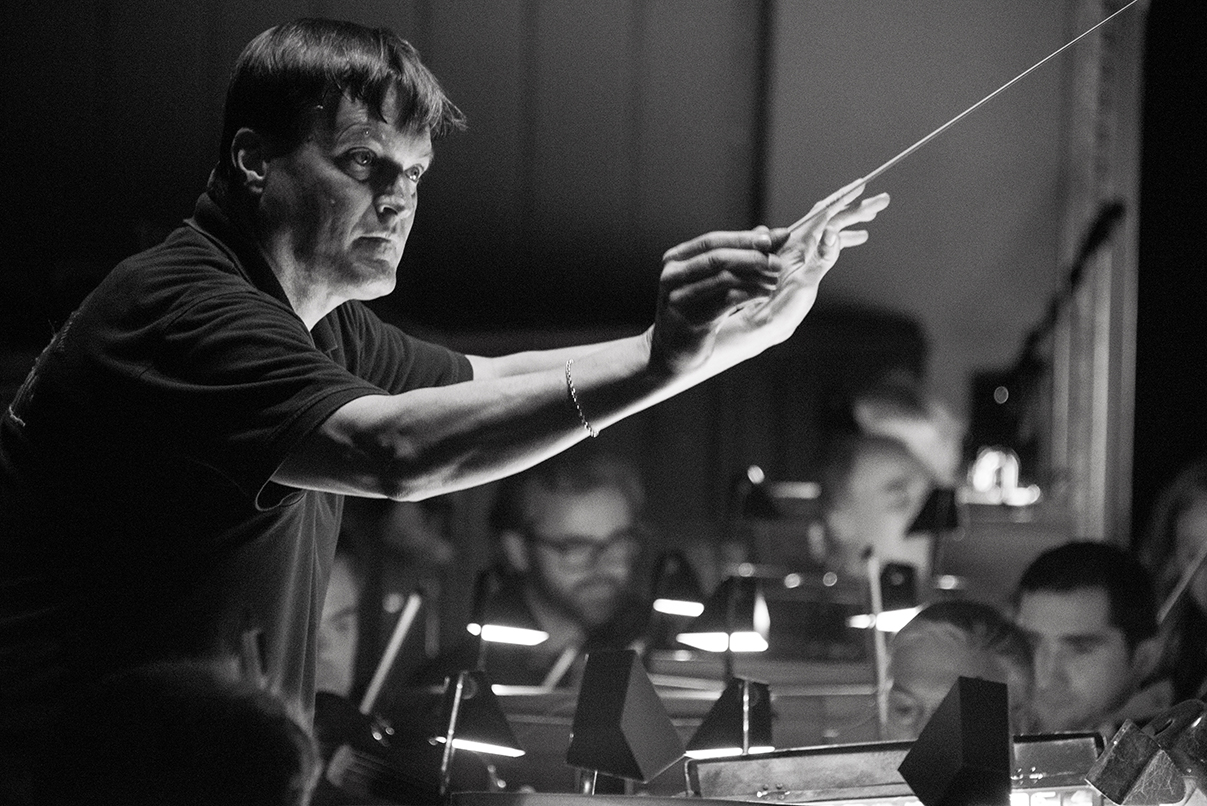
Christian Thielemann in rehearsal.

Shortly after the announcement of the withdrawal of the Berlin Philharmonic, the Salzburg Easter Festival announced that it would be maintained from 2013 with the Staatskapelle Dresden as their new resident orchestra, and its chief conductor, Christian Thielemann, an assistant to Karajan in his youth, as artistic director. Several concerts of that period were also conducted by Myung-whun Chung, who was the principal guest conductor in Dresden, a position which does not exist with the Berlin Philharmonic. It was agreed that the operas would be co-produced with the Dresden Semperoper, where the Staatskapelle serves as pit orchestra. They were also filmed and released on DVD, until 2018.

Starting in 2013, as a consequence of the increased government involvement and in order to reach out to the local public, the festival programme was expanded with a children’s concert, the weekend before the festival, and a “Concert for Salzburg”, off-subscription and at lower prices. The composer and conductor Peter Ruzicka, who took over as general manager in 2015, also introduced a contemporary chamber opera, starting in 2017 with Salvatore Sciarrino’s Lohengrin (1982), followed in 2018 by Bruno Maderna’s Satyricon (1973), and in 2019 by Thérèse, a commission to Philipp Maintz.

In 2017, the festival celebrated its 50th anniversary with a special off-Ring “re-creation” of the 1967 Die Walküre, with sets reconstructed by Jens Kilian from Günther Schneider-Siemssen’s, although with a new staging by Vera Nemirova, since the 1967 production was neither filmed nor documented. Rattle and the Berlin Philharmonic were back for a special concert, and Gundula Janowitz and Christa Ludwig, who sang Sieglinde and Fricka at the 1967 festival, were guests of honours at a symposium about the production. A documentary, Karajan: The Maestro and His Festival, was made that year about the foundation of the festival and the memorial production.

Due to the spread of the COVID-19 pandemic in Austria, the 2020 edition was cancelled, and the 2021 edition was postponed to All Saints’ Day weekend as an “Easter Festival in Autumn”, and shortened with the cancellation of Turandot, which had tentatively been reduced to a concert performance. The 2022 edition returned to the usual format.

=== Directorship of Nikolaus Bachler ===
In July 2020, Nikolaus Bachler, the former intendant of the Bavarian State Opera in Munich, replaced Ruzicka as general manager. He also succeeded Christian Thielemann as artistic director after the 2022 edition, and decided that his and the Staatskapelle Dresden’s residency would end that year. He initially announced that the festival would host a guest conductor and orchestra every year, starting with Andris Nelsons and the Leipzig Gewandhaus Orchestra in 2023.

Changes brought about by Bachler to the festival format from 2023 include the addition performances of contemporary dance and of electronic music, both specially commissioned and performed at the nearby Felsenreitschule. The children’s concert, chamber opera, and Concert for Salzburg were not maintained. Each edition was given a theme, starting with Richard Wagner in 2023: on the programme was Tannhäuser, the only major Wagner opera never yet performed at the festival, and the dance and electronic music commissions were based on his works. The theme was “the Mediterranean South — with Italy at its heart” for 2024, and “Wounds and Wounders” for 2025.

=== Return of the Berlin Philharmonic ===
In January 2023, the festival announced that the Berlin Philharmonic would return as resident orchestra from 2026, with its chief conductor Kirill Petrenko, after a final edition in Baden-Baden in 2025. Bachler, who remains artistic director, had previously hired Petrenko at the Vienna Volksoper and at the Bavarian State Opera; there had been speculations, when his appointment had been announced, that this was a way to facilitate the return of the Berlin Philharmonic.

A new Ring, the third in the festival’s history, staged by Kirill Serebrennikov, was announced for 2026 to 2030, with Arnold Schoenberg’s Moses und Aron between its second and third part in 2028. The start of the cycle coincides with the 150th anniversary of its full premiere in 1876, and Die Walküre in the second year with the 60th anniversary of the festival. The Ring is to be staged at the Felsenreitschule, used for the first time for the main opera of the Easter Festival.

== Programmes ==
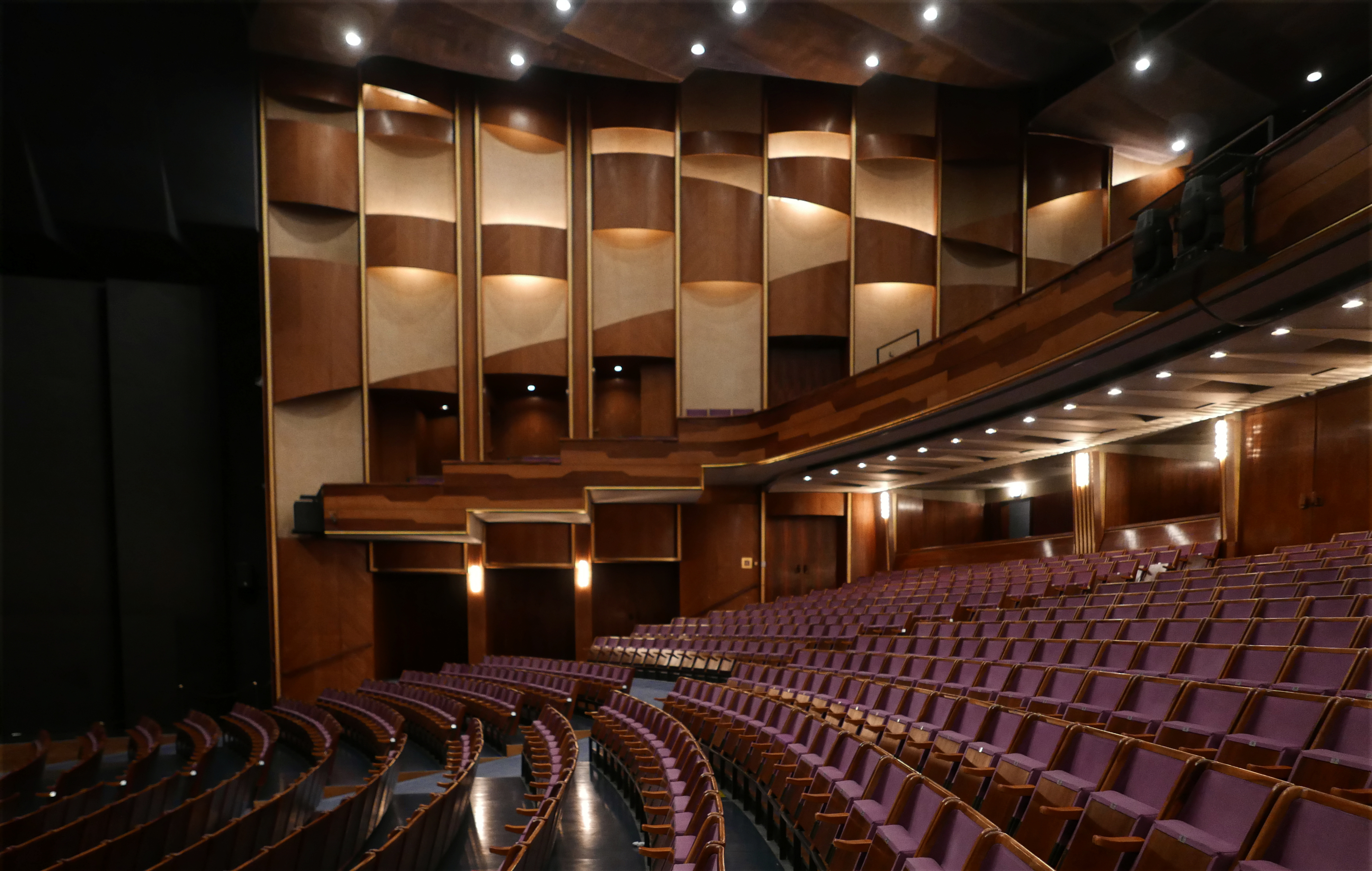
The auditorium of the Salzburg Grand Festival Theatre.

The festival is held over the extended week before Easter (Holy Week), beginning on Palm Sunday or the day before, and ending on Easter Monday.

Since its early years, the main programme has been structured in two identical cycles each with one opera performance, two orchestral concerts, and one choral concert. For a long time, all ticket were sold in subscription for a full cycle to the members of the Association of Patrons; tickets for a single performance are nowadays put on sale after the subscription period. The opera performances are usually on the first and last night; there has sometimes been an off-cycle third one. The chamber music series introduced by Claudio Abbado in the 1990s has become a permanent part of the festival programme. Successive directors have experimented with additional types of performance.

All opera performance and orchestral and choral concerts take place at the Grand Festival Theatre, and the chamber music concerts are usually at the Mozarteum. Other venues over the city have been used since the 2000s.

== Governance and funding ==
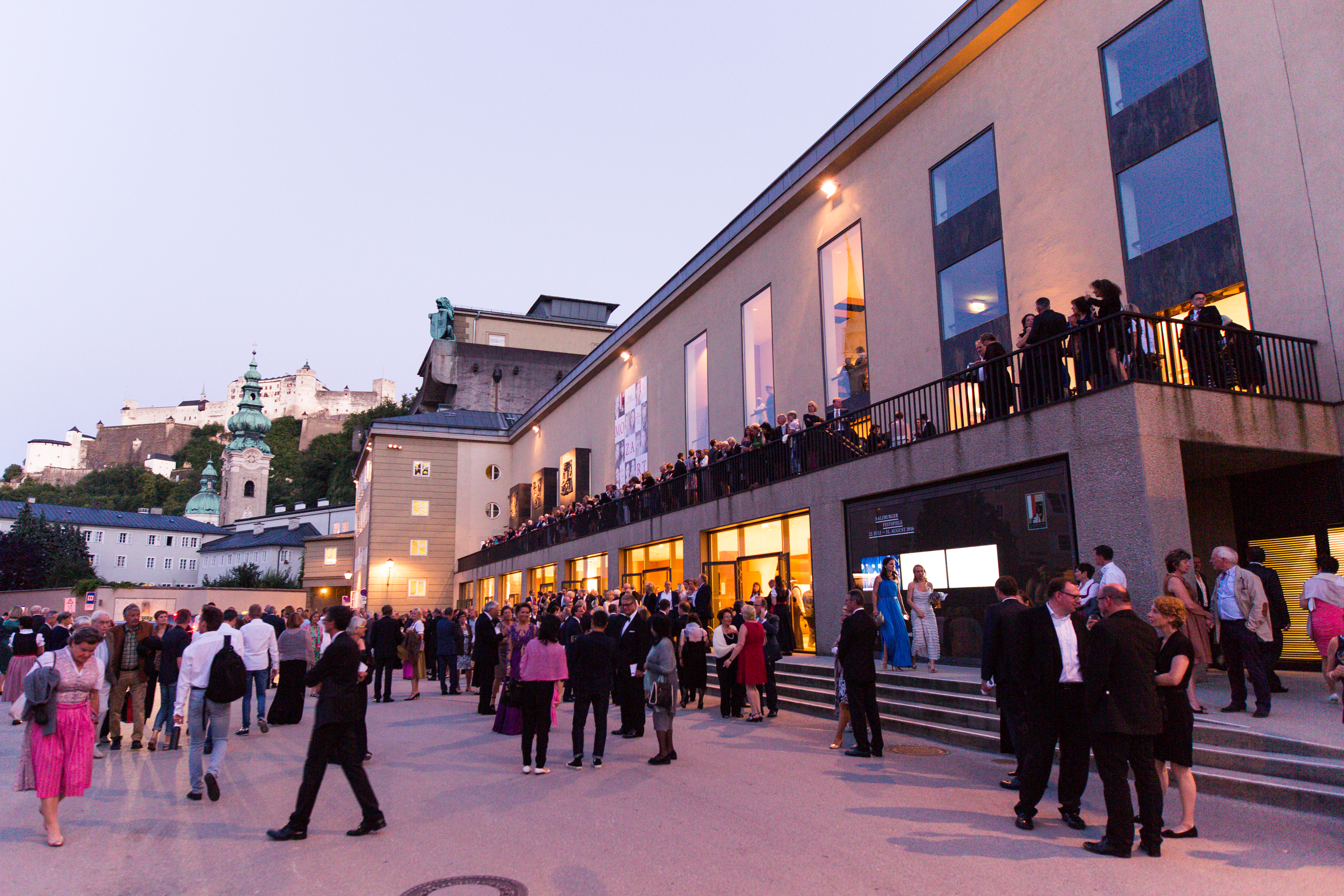
The Salzburg Grand Festival Theatre.

The festival is managed as a private liability company (GmbH), the Osterfestspiele Salzburg GmbH (until 2010 Osterfestspiel Gesellschaft mbH Salzburg), formed on 10 March 1966. Since a restructuring carried out after the 2009–2010 scandal, the company is owned by the Stiftung Herbert von Karajan Osterfestspiele Salzburg (25%), the State of Salzburg (20%), the City of Salzburg (20%), the SalzburgerLand Tourismus regional tourist information centre (20%), and the Association of Patrons (15%).

The Stiftung Herbert von Karajan Osterfestspiele Salzburg (until 2018 Herbert-von-Karajan-Osterfestspiel-Stiftung) is a foundation created by Herbert von Karajan in 1967 to support the festival and other activities. (Note: Not to be confused with the Herbert-von-Karajan-Stiftung, a Berlin-based foundation created in 1968 to fund artistic and scientific activities, most famously the Karajan Academy; and with the Salzburg-based Eliette and Herbert von Karajan Institute (formerly the Herbert-von-Karajan-Centrum in Vienna), which promotes and manages the conductor’s legacy.) Until the 2010 restructuring, it owned 98% of the GmbH; the remaining 2% were initially owned by Karajan’s childhood friend Erich Aigner, who had transferred his shares to his son Christoph Aicher. His widow Eliette von Karajan, who was chairwoman of the foundation until 2019, became honorary chairwoman in 2020, and was replaced on the board by their daughters Isabel and Arabel.

The GmbH had a yearly budget of between 4 and 6 million euros as of the 2000s. Most of the revenues are from ticket sales, which reached 2.5 to 3 million euros in the 2000s (13,500 to 16,500 sold per edition); the Association of Patrons; and commercial sponsors. The festival worked without government subsidies until 1996, and remains largely self-sufficient: it has since received subsidies from the state and city governments and the state Tourismusförderungsfonds, which amounted to €375,000 (6,1% of its budget) in 2007–2008.

The Association of Patrons of the Easter Festival in Salzburg (Verein der Förderer der Osterfestspiele in Salzburg) was designed to levy the high interest generated by the festival as a source of revenue: access to tickets is guaranteed to the 2,500 members of the association, who pay a contribution of 300 euros per year (50 euros for young people), and enjoy priority booking for a subscription to an entire cycle. For many years, seats were in such high demand that membership was the only way to obtain them, despite their price; tickets left unsold are nowadays put on sale at a later date to the general public. Members of the association have also been thanked with such perks as entry to public rehearsals and special recordings. Patrons associations were also created in Germany, in the United Kingdom, and in the United States.

The festival frequently relies on opera co-productions, since it would otherwise need to fund an entirely new show for two or three performances. From mid-1980s until the mid-2000s, this was often with the (summertime) Salzburg Festival. Some productions were also sent on tour in Japan.

The GmbH is independent from the Salzburg Festival Fund (Salzburger Festspielfonds), the body which organizes the summer festival and the Salzburg Whitsun Festival. They have a partnership agreement under which the Easter Festival uses the staff, technical facilities, set and costume workshops, and musical instruments of the summer festival.

== Editions ==
Year	Dates	Opera	Stage director	Guest conductors	Note
Directorship of Herbert von Karajan with the Berlin Philharmonic
1967	19–27 March	Richard Wagner: Die Walküre	Herbert von Karajan	None	Part of a Ring cycle; co-production with the Metropolitan Opera, New York (1967).
1968	7–15 April	Richard Wagner: Das Rheingold and Die Walküre	Herbert von Karajan	None	Part of a Ring cycle; Rheingold in co-production with the Metropolitan Opera, New York (1968). Walküre revived from 1967.
1969	30 March – 7 April	Richard Wagner: Siegfried and Das Rheingold	Herbert von Karajan	None	Part of a Ring cycle; Siegfried in co-production with the Metropolitan Opera, New York (1972). Rheingold revived from 1968.
1970	21–30 March	Richard Wagner: Götterdämmerung	Herbert von Karajan	None	Part of a Ring cycle.
1971	3–12 April	Ludwig van Beethoven: Fidelio	Herbert von Karajan	None	
1972	25 March – 3 April	Richard Wagner: Tristan und Isolde	Herbert von Karajan	None	
1973	15–23 April	Richard Wagner: Das Rheingold and Tristan und Isolde	Herbert von Karajan	None	Revivals from 1968 and 1972.
1974	6–15 April	Richard Wagner: Die Meistersinger von Nürnberg	Herbert von Karajan	None	No studio recording, as Karajan had made one in 1970 with the Staatskapelle Dresden.
1975	22–31 March	Giacomo Puccini: La bohème Richard Wagner: Die Meistersinger von Nürnberg	Franco Zeffirelli; Herbert von Karajan	None	Meistersinger revived from 1974.
1976	10–19 April	Richard Wagner: Lohengrin	Herbert von Karajan	None	
1977	3–11 April	Giuseppe Verdi: Il trovatore	Herbert von Karajan	None	Production from the 1962 Salzburg Festival.
1978	19–27 March	Ludwig van Beethoven: Fidelio; Giuseppe Verdi: Il trovatore	Herbert von Karajan	None	Revivals from 1971 and 1977.
1979	7–16 April	Giuseppe Verdi: Don Carlo	Herbert von Karajan	None	Production from the 1975 Salzburg Festival.
1980	30 March – 7 April	Richard Wagner: Parsifal	Herbert von Karajan	None	
1981	11–20 April	Richard Wagner: Parsifal	Herbert von Karajan	None	Revival from 1980.
1982	3–12 April	Richard Wagner: Der fliegende Holländer	Herbert von Karajan	None	
1983	23 March – 4 April	Richard Wagner: Der fliegende Holländer	Herbert von Karajan	None	Revival from 1982.
1984	14–23 April	Richard Wagner: Lohengrin	Herbert von Karajan	None	Revival from 1976.
1985	30 March – 8 April	Georges Bizet: Carmen	Herbert von Karajan	Klaus Tennstedt	Co-production with the 1985 Salzburg Festival.
1986	22–31 March	Giuseppe Verdi: Don Carlo	Herbert von Karajan	Riccardo Chailly	Revival from 1979; broadcast live on television.
1987	11–20 April	Wolfgang Amadeus Mozart: Don Giovanni	Michael Hampe	Carlo Maria Giulini	Co-production with the 1987 Salzburg Festival, filmed there.
1988	26 March – 4 April	Giacomo Puccini: Tosca	Herbert von Karajan	Carlo Maria Giulini	Co-production with the 1989 Salzburg Festival.
1989	18–27 March	Giacomo Puccini: Tosca	Herbert von Karajan	Georg Solti	Revival from 1988.
Transition and directorship of Georg Solti (1992–1993) with the Berlin Philharmonic
1990	7–15 April	Ludwig van Beethoven: Fidelio	Peter Brenner	Claudio Abbado, Colin Davis	Featuring Kurt Masur as main conductor, with the Leipzig Gewandhaus Orchestra and the Vienna Philharmonic. Co-production with the 1990 Salzburg Festival.
1991	23 March – 1 April	Wolfgang Amadeus Mozart: The Marriage of Figaro	Michael Hampe	Daniel Barenboim	Featuring Bernard Haitink as main conductor. Co-production with the 1991 Salzburg Festival.
1992	11–20 April	Richard Strauss: Die Frau ohne Schatten	Götz Friedrich	Claudio Abbado	Co-production with the 1992 Salzburg Festival, filmed there.
1993	3–12 April	Giuseppe Verdi: Falstaff	Luca Ronconi	Claudio Abbado	Co-production with the 1993 Salzburg Festival.
Directorship of Claudio Abbado with the Berlin Philharmonic
1994	26 March – 4 April	Modest Mussorgsky: Boris Godunov	Herbert Wernicke	Georg Solti	Co-production with the 1994 Salzburg Festival.
1995	8–17 April	Richard Strauss: Elektra	Lev Dodin	Bernard Haitink, Georg Solti	Co-production with the Teatro Comunale, Florence (1996).
1996	29 March – 8 April	Giuseppe Verdi: Otello	Ermanno Olmi	Iván Fischer, Bernard Haitink	Co-production with the Teatro Regio, Turin (1997).
1997	21–31 March	Alban Berg: Wozzeck	Peter Stein	Zubin Mehta	Co-production with the 1997 Salzburg Festival.
1998	3–13 April	Modest Mussorgsky: Boris Godunov	Herbert Wernicke	Nikolaus Harnoncourt, Mariss Jansons	Revival from 1994; revived and filmed at the 1998 Salzburg Festival.
1999	27 March – 5 April	Richard Wagner: Tristan und Isolde	Klaus Michael Grüber	Bernard Haitink, Kurt Sanderling	Co-production with the 2000 Salzburg Festival.
2000	15–24 April	Giuseppe Verdi: Simon Boccanegra	Peter Stein	Kurt Masur, Roger Norrington	Co-production with the Vienna State Opera (2002).
2001	7–16 April	Giuseppe Verdi: Falstaff	Declan Donnellan	Zubin Mehta	Co-production with the 2001 Salzburg Festival.
2002	23 March – 1 April	Richard Wagner: Parsifal	Peter Stein	Mariss Jansons, Christian Thielemann	
Directorship of Simon Rattle with the Berlin Philharmonic
2003	12–21 April	Ludwig van Beethoven: Fidelio	Nikolaus Lehnhoff	Bernard Haitink	Co-production with the Lyon National Opera (2003) and the Israeli Opera, Tel Aviv (2005); filmed in Salzburg.
2004	3–12 April	Wolfgang Amadeus Mozart: Così fan tutte	Ursel Herrmann and Karl-Ernst Herrmann	None	Co-production with the 2004 Salzburg Festival.
2005	11–28 March	Benjamin Britten: Peter Grimes	Trevor Nunn	None	Co-production with the Metropolitan Opera, New York (not revived).
2006	8–17 April	Claude Debussy: Pelléas et Mélisande	Stanislas Nordey	None	Co-production with The Royal Opera, London (2007).
2007	31 March – 9 April	Richard Wagner: Das Rheingold	Stéphane Braunschweig	Bernard Haitink	Part of a Ring cycle; co-production with the 2006 Aix-en-Provence Festival.
2008	15–24 March	Richard Wagner: Die Walküre	Stéphane Braunschweig	Seiji Ozawa	Part of a Ring cycle; co-production with the 2007 Aix-en-Provence Festival, filmed there.
2009	4–13 April	Richard Wagner: Siegfried	Stéphane Braunschweig	Franz Welser-Möst	Part of a Ring cycle; co-production with the 2008 Aix-en-Provence Festival.
2010	27 March – 5 April	Richard Wagner: Götterdämmerung	Stéphane Braunschweig	Mariss Jansons	Part of a Ring cycle; co-production with the 2009 Aix-en-Provence Festival, filmed there.
2011	16–25 April	Richard Strauss: Salome	Stefan Herheim	Gustavo Dudamel	Co-production with the Norwegian National Opera, Oslo (2013) and the Royal Danish Theatre, Copenhagen (2016).
2012	31 March – 9 April	Georges Bizet: Carmen	Aletta Collins	Zubin Mehta	Co-production with the 2012 Salzburg Festival.
Directorship of Christian Thielemann with the Staatskapelle Dresden
2013	23 March – 1 April	Richard Wagner: Parsifal	Michael Schulz	Myung-whun Chung	Co-production with the Semperoper, Dresden (not revived).
2014	12–21 April	Richard Strauss: Arabella	Florentine Klepper	Christoph Eschenbach	Co-production with the Semperoper, Dresden (2014).
2015	28 March – 6 April	Pietro Mascagni: Cavalleria rusticana Ruggero Leoncavallo: Pagliacci	Philipp Stölzl	Daniele Gatti	Co-production with the Semperoper, Dresden (2016).
2016	19–28 March	Giuseppe Verdi: Otello	Vincent Boussard	Vladimir Jurowski	Co-production with the Semperoper, Dresden (2017).
2017	8–17 April	Richard Wagner: Die Walküre	Vera Nemirova	Myung-whun Chung, Simon Rattle, Franz Welser-Möst	50th anniversary. “Re-creation” from the 1967 production; co-production with the 2017 Beijing Music Festival. Guest concerts by the Berlin Philharmonic and the Vienna Philharmonic.
2018	24 March – 2 April	Giacomo Puccini: Tosca	Michael Sturminger	Andrés Orozco-Estrada	
2019	13–22 April	Richard Wagner: Die Meistersinger von Nürnberg	Jens-Daniel Herzog	Christoph Eschenbach, Mariss Jansons	Co-production with the Semperoper, Dresden (2020), Tokyo Bunka Kaikan (2021), and the New National Theatre Tokyo (2021).
2020	Cancelled (planned 4–13 April)	Giuseppe Verdi: Don Carlo	Vera Nemirova	Daniel Harding	Co-production with the Semperoper, Dresden (2021).
2021	29 October – 1 November (postponed from 27 March – 5 April)	Giacomo Puccini: Turandot (cancelled)	Yona Kim	Daniele Gatti	Co-production with the Hamburg State Opera (2021).
2022	9–18 April	Richard Wagner: Lohengrin	Jossi Wieler, Anna Viebrock and Sergio Morabito	Myung-whun Chung, Tugan Sokhiev	Co-production with the Vienna State Opera (2024), filmed there .
Directorship of Nikolaus Bachler with guest conductors and orchestras
2023	1–9 April	Richard Wagner: Tannhäuser	Romeo Castellucci	None	Featuring Andris Nelsons with the Leipzig Gewandhaus Orchestra. Production from the Bavarian State Opera (2017).
2024	22 March – 1 April	Amilcare Ponchielli: La Gioconda	Oliver Mears	Jakub Hrůša	Featuring Antonio Pappano with the Orchestra dell'Accademia Nazionale di Santa Cecilia. Co-production with the Greek National Opera, Athens (2025) and The Royal Opera, London (announced 2027).
2025	12–21 April	Modest Mussorgsky: Khovanshchina	Simon McBurney	Maxim Emelyanychev	Featuring Esa-Pekka Salonen with the Finnish Radio Symphony Orchestra. Co-production with the Metropolitan Opera, New York.
Directorship of Nikolaus Bachler with Kirill Petrenko and the Berlin Philharmonic
2026	27 March – 6 April	Richard Wagner: Das Rheingold	Kirill Serebrennikov	Daniel Harding, Tugan Sokhiev	Part of a Ring cycle.
2027	20–29 March	Richard Wagner: Die Walküre	Kirill Serebrennikov	Lahav Shani, Emmanuelle Haïm	60th anniversary. Part of a Ring cycle.
2028	TBC	Arnold Schoenberg: Moses und Aron	TBA	TBA	
2029	TBC	Richard Wagner: Siegfried	Kirill Serebrennikov	TBA	Part of a Ring cycle.
2030	TBC	Richard Wagner: Götterdämmerung	Kirill Serebrennikov	TBA	Part of a Ring cycle.
Source: Salzburg Easter Festival performance database

== Leadership ==
=== Artistic directors ===
- 1967–1989: Herbert von Karajan, chief conductor of the Berlin Philharmonic.
- 1992–1993: Georg Solti.
- 1994–2002: Claudio Abbado, chief conductor of the Berlin Philharmonic.
- 2003–2012: Simon Rattle, chief conductor of the Berlin Philharmonic.
- 2013–2022: Christian Thielemann, chief conductor of the Dresden Staatskapelle.
- Since 2022: Nikolaus Bachler.

=== General managers ===
- 1967–1989: Erich Aigner.
- 1989–1994: Beate Burchhard, previously assistant to Karajan.
- 1994–1997: Robert Minder.
- 1997–2009: Michaël Dewitte.
- 2010–2015: Peter Alward.
- 2015–2020: Peter Ruzicka, formerly artistic director of the Salzburg Festival.
- Since 2020: Nikolaus Bachler.

== Prizes ==
In the 1990s, Eliette von Karajan, the conductor’s widow, created a prix Eliette von Karajan reflecting her commitment to the arts, and her practice of painting as a hobby. A Salzburg Easter Festival Literary Prize (Italian: Premio di Letteratura Festival di Pasqua di Salisburgo) was also created as part of the Nonino prizes, funded by the Nonino grappa distillery.

In 2015, Eliette von Karajan created a Herbert von Karajan Prize (Herbert-von-Karajan-Preis), to be granted every year to “a musician whose exceptional artistic achievements have found global recognition”, starting in 2017 on the occasion of the festival’s 50th anniversary. It is awarded during the festival, and comes with a grant of €50,000.

== Media ==
=== Recordings ===
As for the summer festival, opera performances and many concerts were broadcast live on the radio by the Österreichischer Rundfunk (ORF). Some recordings have been released commercially.

Some productions have also been filmed for commercial release. The 1986 Don Carlo and 1987 Don Giovanni (summer revival) were filmed by Herbert von Karajan’s company Telemondial, the catalogue of which was bought and released by Sony Classical. Most productions during Christian Thielemann’s direction were filmed and released on DVD by Unitel.

=== Documentaries ===
- Reichenbach, François (1970). Herbert von Karajan zeigt: Entstehung einer Opernaufführung (Documentary) (in German). Salzburg: Cosmotel. Duration 40 min. Covers the 1967 production of Die Walküre, with scenes from the rehearsals.
- Schalle, Hannes M. (2017). Karajan: The Maestro and His Festival (Documentary) (in English and German). Salzburg: Moonlake Entertainment. Duration 52 min. Made for the 50th anniversary of the festival and centres on the “re-creation” of the 1967 production.

== See also ==
- List of opera festivals
- List of classical music festivals
