= Karajan: The Maestro and His Festival =

Documentary film

- Directed by: Hannes M. Schalle
- Produced by: Hannes M. Schalle
- Narrated by: Senta Berger
- Distributed by: Sony Music Entertainment
- Release date: 2017
- Country: Germany
- Language: German

Karajan: The Maestro and His Festival (German: Karajan – Der Meister und seine Spiele) is a documentary film about the creation and production of Richard Wagner's opera Die Walküre in 1967 by Herbert von Karajan, his favourite stage designer Günther Schneider-Siemssen and the 2017 recreation of his ground-breaking performance.

== Production ==
Whereas Karajan acted as conductor, stage director and producer at the time, in 2017 the opera was created by a team, the conductor Christian Thielemann in collaboration with stage director Vera Nemirova and stage designer Jens Kilian.

Writer and director Hannes M. Schalle produced the documentary with his production company Moonlake Entertainment and joined with ORF/3sat to tell the story of both productions, set on one of the world's largest opera stages in the Großes Festspielhaus of the Salzburg Festival. The film, narrated by Senta Berger, was shot on locations in Salzburg, Anif, the Großes Festspielhaus, the Mozarteum and at the Semperoper in Dresden. The making of the film was a collaboration of Hannes M. Schalle together with the Eliette and Herbert von Karajan Institute, the Salzburg Easter Festival, Unitel, Deutsche Grammophon, Sony Music and ORF/3sat. The documentary was released on DVD and digital on 21 July 2017 by Sony Music Entertainment.

== Content ==
The film unveils the story of the foundation of Karajan's personal festival, his passion for Wagner's Ring and for building a historical monument together with Schneider-Siemssen. In 2017, the festival celebrates its 50th anniversary recreating the legendary Walküre production of 1967.
