= Manos Tsangaris =

German composer

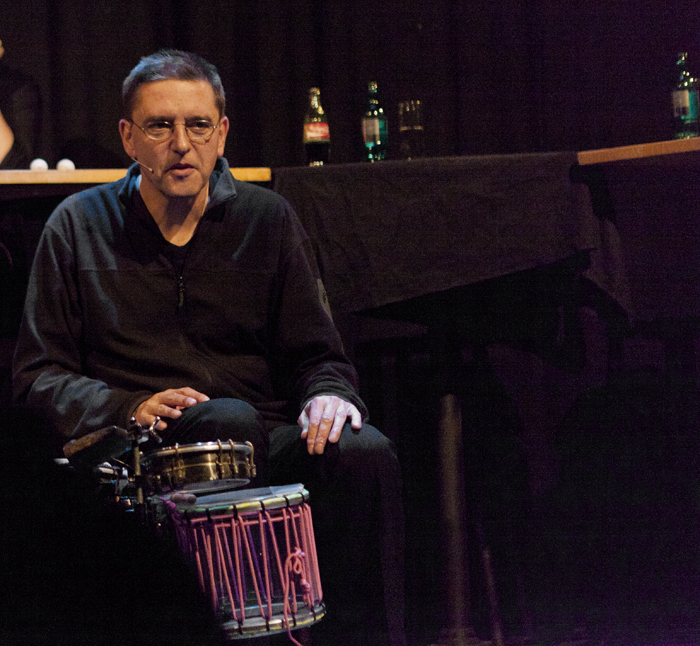
Manos Tsangaris, December 2011

Manos Tsangaris (born 8 December 1956) is a German composer, musician, sound art installation and performance artist, and a poet. Since 2024, he is president of the Akademie der Künste Berlin (AdK).

== Life ==
Born in Düsseldorf, Tsangaris studied at the Hochschule für Musik und Tanz Köln from 1976 to 1983 composition with Mauricio Kagel and percussion with Christoph Caskel, and at the Kunstakademie Düsseldorf with Alfonso Hüppi. Since 1980, he has participated several times in the Darmstädter Ferienkurse for Neue Musik and worked for the Münchner Kammerspiele. In 1991, he was invited by the Soviet composers' association as artist-in-residence in Moscow, in the same year he received the Bernd Alois Zimmermann scholarship from the city of Cologne, in 1992/93, the scholarship at the Akademie Schloss Solitude and in 1997 the art prize of the Akademie der Künste (AdK) Berlin, of which he has been a member since 2009. In the same year, he received the Orchestra Prize of the Donaueschinger Musiktage for his piece Batsheba. Eat the History. Since 2012, he is head of the AdK section music. Since 2024, he is president of the AdK. In 2017, he was elected full member of the Bayerische Akademie der Schönen Künste in the music section.

Since the 1970s, Tsangaris has published poems, performed as a soloist and with various music groups (including Ritim Grup and MIR) and exhibited drawings, theatre machinery and sound installations. He participated in festivals such as Cologne–New York in New York (1989), Ars Electronica in Linz (1991), Linz; "Sound Ways" in Saint Petersburg (1995), "Yokohama Arts" (1997) and the "Musica-Festival Strasbourg" (1998).

Tsangaris has composed works commissioned by the Westdeutscher Rundfunk, the Südwestrundfunk, the Bayerische Staatsoper, the Kölner Philharmonie, the Diözesanmuseum Köln, the Kunststiftung Nordrhein-Westfalen, the Katholisches Bildungswerk Köln and the city of Witten. He is also active as a percussionist; he plays with Jaki Liebezeit and other percussionists in the improvisation ensemble Drums Off Chaos.

In 2009, he was appointed professor of composition at the Hochschule für Musik Dresden. In 2015 he was a scholarship holder at the Villa Massimo in Rome. In 2016, Tsangaris took over the artistic direction of the Munich Biennale together with the Swiss composer Daniel Ott (as successor to Peter Ruzicka).

== Publications ==
- Tsangaris, Manos (1986). Stille Post (in German). Köln: Thürmchen. ISBN 978-3-926402-00-4.
- ——; Barzen, Rainer (1990). 3 x 8 Zeichnungen und 14 Gedichte (in German). Köln: Thürmchen-Verl. ISBN 978-3-926402-02-8.
- —— (1995). Mundmassung (in German). Stuttgart: Ed. Solitude. ISBN 978-3-929085-21-1.
- —— (2002). Die kleine Trance (in German). Stuttgart: Radius Verlag. ISBN 978-3-87173-236-2.
- —— (2014). Werkbuch Manos Tsangaris (in German). Köln: Kolumba. ISBN 978-3-9815922-0-7.
- —— (2017). Unbekannte Empfänger: Gedichte (in German). Stuttgart: Radius-Verlag GmbH. ISBN 978-3-87173-043-6.
