= Daniel Ott =

Swiss composer (born 1960)

Daniel Ott (born 6 September 1960) is a Swiss composer.

== Career ==
Born in Grub AR, Canton of Appenzell Ausserrhoden, Ott graduated in 1980. Afterwards he worked as a teacher in the regions of Basel and Graubünden and worked in independent theatre groups. From 1983 to 1985, he studied theatre in Paris and London. From 1985 to 1990, he studied composition with Nicolaus A. Huber at the Folkwang University of the Arts and with Klaus Huber at the Hochschule für Musik Freiburg. Since 1990, Daniel Ott has been working as a freelance composer, pianist and performer with a focus on new music theatre and interdisciplinary and space and landscape-related works.

In 1999/2000, Ott created the full-length music theatre cycle ojota I-IV. In 2000 he wrote klangkörperklang - music for the Swiss Pavilion Expo 2000 Hannover by Peter Zumthor. This was followed by landscape compositions for the harbour Sassnitz/Rügen (2002), the place of pilgrimage Heiligkreuz/Entlebuch (2003), the river Neisse between Görlitz and Zgorzelec (2005) and the Rhine port of Basel (2006).

From 1995 to 2004, Ott held a teaching position for experimental music at the Universität der Künste Berlin, where he founded the KlangKunstBühne summer academy in 2003. Since 2005, he has been professor for composition and experimental music theatre at the Berlin University of the Arts. He founded the Festival for Neue Musik in Rümlingen in 1990 and is a member of the board. In 2016, Ott took over the artistic direction of the Munich Biennale together with the composer Manos Tsangaris (successor to Peter Ruzicka).

== Publications ==
- Ein gesamtkunstwerk-ähnliches Live-Erlebnis. Zur Musik von Daniel Ott für den Klangkörper Schweiz, by Thomas Gartmann. In Antonio Baldessarre (ed.): Musik.Raum.Akkord.Bild. Festschrift zum 65. Geburtstag von Dorothea Baumann. Bern: Lang, 2012, pp. 473–498
- Composing with Raw Materials: Daniel Ott’s Music-theatre Portraits and Landscapes, by Christa Brüstle. In Rebstock / Roesner (ed.): Composed Theatre. Aesthetics, Practices, Processes. UK, 2012. ISBN 978-1-84150-456-8
- Vom Hafenbecken auf die Schafmatt. Daniel Ott:Ein Portrait, by Thomas Meyer. In Dissonance Nr. 113, March 2011
- Sound Studies. Traditionen – Methoden – Desiderate. Eine Einführung. With contributions from Sam Auinger, Roger Behrens, Diedrich Diederichsen, Florian Dombois, Wolfgang Ernst, Golo Föllmer, Thomas Hermann, Daniel Ott, Holger Schulze, Martin Supper, Elena Ungeheuer, Carl-Frank Westermann among others. Ed. by Holger Schulze Bielefeld 2008, 316 p. transcript Verlag. ISBN 978-3-89942-894-0
- Geballte Gegenwart. Experiment Neue Musik Rümlingen, ed. by Daniel Ott, Lukas Ott, Lydia Jeschke 232 pages, numerous colour illustrations, with 140 minutes of music on two CDs Christoph Merian-Verlag 2005. ISBN 978-3-85616-257-3
- Klangkörperbuch Lexikon zum Pavillon der schweizerischen Eidgenossenschaft an der EXPO 2000 in Hannover Peter Zumthor with Plinio Bachmann, Karoline Gruber, Ida Gut, Daniel Ott, Max Rigendinger. Edited by Roderick Hönig. Basel; Boston; Berlin Birkhäuser, 2000. ISBN 3-7643-6324-X
- Klangkunst – Musiktheater. Musik im Dialog II, ojota – Schuhe, Schritte, Wege. A conversation between Daniel Ott and Matthias Rebstock, Yearbook of the Berlin Society for Music 1999, ed. by S. Sanio, B. Wackernagel, J. Ravenna. Pfau Verlag. ISBN 3-89727-107-9
- Das Musiktheater – Exempel der Kunst Ed. Otto Kolleritsch. Contribution by Daniel Ott: Voraussetzungen für ein neues Musiktheater-Gesamtkunstwerk. Studien zur Wertungsforschung, vol. 38. Universal-Edition 26838. ISBN 3-7024-0263-2.
- Hörgeschichten: neue musik ganz schön vielseitig. Europäischer Musikmonat 2001. Ed. Europäischer Musikmonat. Beitrag von Daniel Ott: Gedankensplitter zu Klangserve. Opinio Verlag AG, Basel. ISBN 3-03999-014-4.
