= Hannes M. Schalle =

Austrian director, writer, producer and film composer

Hannes Michael Schalle
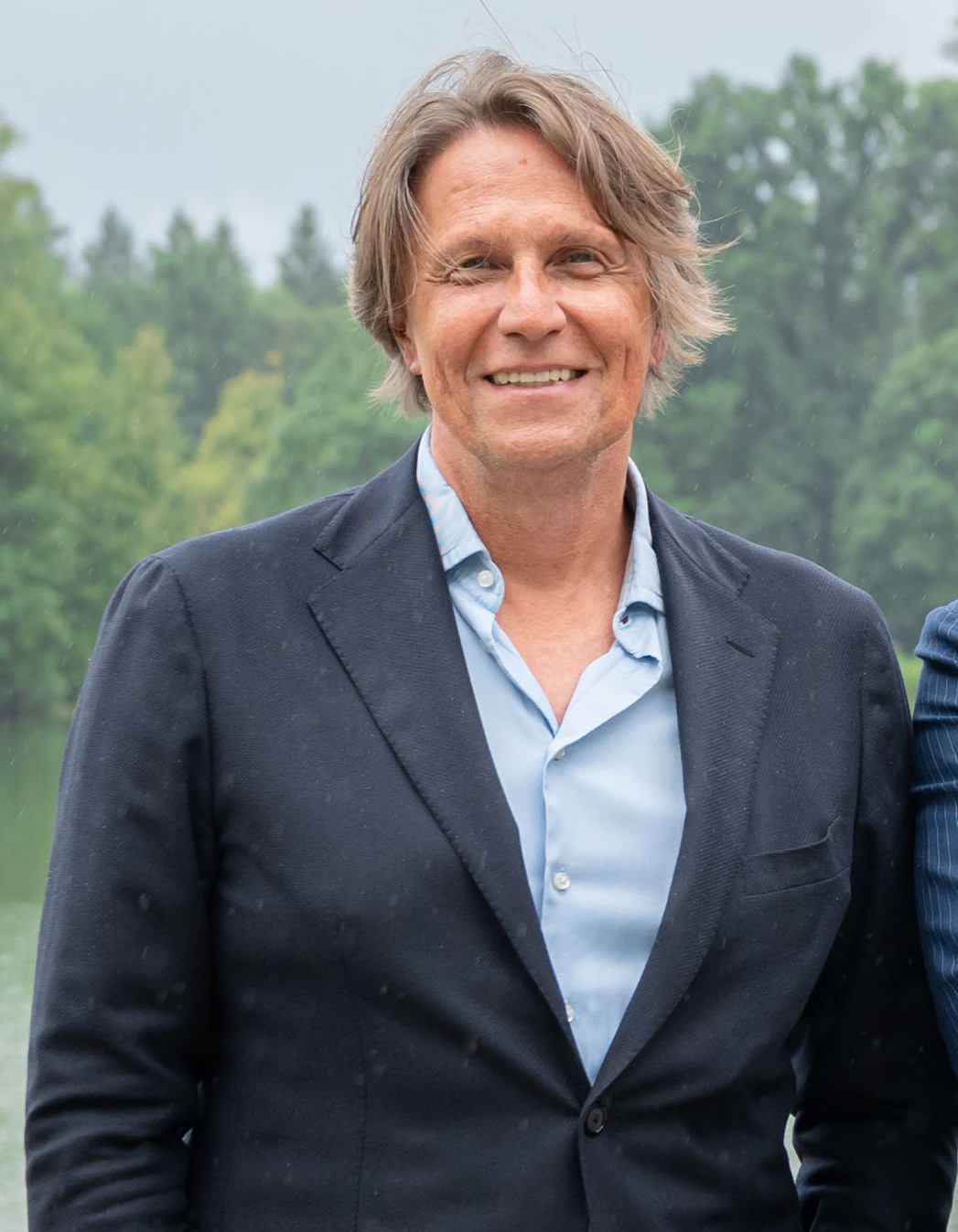
- Hannes M. Schalle, 2025
- Born: 9 March 1963; Villach-Warmbad
- Education: Harvard University; Berklee College of Music
- Occupations: Director, writer, producer, composer
- Awards: Deutscher Fernsehpreis

Hannes Michael Schalle (born 9 March 1963 in Villach-Warmbad, Austria) is an Austrian television producer, director, screenwriter and film composer.

As a member of the International Academy of Television Arts and Sciences, Schalle has been active across multiple fields in the media and entertainment industry. He produced over 50 fictional and non-fictional film productions, composed over 70 film scores and produced music videos for BMG, Sony Music, Warner Classics, including his own music TV show Classic Cuts for ZDF / 3sat. Next to his feature productions Schalle directs commercials for UBS, Deutsche Telekom, Chanel, Samsung, Star Wars and the Made GREAT in Britain campaign.

== Early life and career ==
Schalle was born on 9 March 1963 in Villach-Warmbad, Austria. After studying at Harvard University and Berklee College of Music in Boston, Schalle participated in a pilot project called "Academics start companies" by the Austrian Ministry of Science Research and Economy in 1989. He co-founded Schalle Digital Productions the same year. The company later evolved into Aikon Media & Technology and was ultimately consolidated under the Moonlake Entertainment brand in 2020.

From 1998 to 2002 he was managing director at the University of Applied Sciences, Salzburg.

== Works ==
=== Television ===
In January, 2009 Moonlake and the UFA agreed on a cooperation for several TV event movies, one of which was 33 Days – Born to be Wild (AT) showing the life and accident of Formula 1 legend Niki Lauda including the almost deadly accident at the Nürburgring and his comeback only 33 days later. Premiere Picture produced his Feature Documentary 33 Days – Born to be Wild under the name Lauda – The Untold Story in 2014. Besides Niki Lauda the movie also features Sir Jackie Stewart, David Coulthard, Mark Webber, Nico Rosberg, Lewis Hamilton, Bernd Mayländer, Hans-Joachim Stuck, Jochen Mass, James Hunt and many more. It premiered in Cannes in 2014 and was released in July 2015 by Bulldog Film Distribution in Great Britain. It was No. 1 bestseller on iTunes and Amazon.

His more recent productions include the biographical documentary Between Heaven and Hell (2024) with the actor Philipp Hochmair and the crime drama series Alpentod (2024) featuring Veronica Ferres.

=== Special Programming & Sports Documentaries ===
In 2013, Schalle acted as writer, director and composer for the TV documentary Das Digitale Ich – Menschen, Computer und Emotionen with Sherry Turkle, Kevin Kelly, Viktor Mayer-Schönberger, John Underkoffler, Gerfried Stocker and others.

In 2015, Schalle directed another motorsports Feature Documentary with the title The Green Hell telling the story of the Nürburgring between 1925 and 2015, released in February 2017 by Odeon Cinemas in UK, Ireland, Germany, Austria, Spain and Italy. The production, led by executive producers Eric Nicoli and William Lewis was supported content-related by Sir Jackie Stewart, who came up with the name Green Hell for the Nordschleife. The movie features Bernd Mayländer, Hans-Joachim Stuck, Jochen Mass, Sir Stirling Moss, Sabine Schmitz, Niki Lauda, Adrian Newey, Andrew Palmer, Robert Lechner, Christian Danner, Tom Chilton, Walter Röhrl and many more.

He also wrote, directed and produced the cinema documentary Monaco Grand Prix and filmed the Historic Grand Prix of Monaco in 2016. Filming was completed at the Monaco Grand Prix in 2017.

In 2021, Schalle was commissioned by Telekom Deutschland to produce Beethoven X – The AI Project, which was released on MagentaTV, ARD, and RTL+. Alongside Sebastian Koch, Billy Joel played a leading role in the project. In 2022, Schalle produced the TV special Christmas in the Alps, featuring Melissa Naschenweng, Chris Steger, Nik P., and Hansi Hinterseer, which was broadcast on ServusTV. In 2024, Schalle created the biographical documentary Between Heaven and Hell about the actor Philipp Hochmair.

Later in 2024, the Christmas special Christmas Lights, featuring Hansi Hinterseer as narrator and singer, was released on ServusTV and digital platforms. In 2024 and 2025, he worked as both writer and director on two specials, Welcome to My Life and The Long Road to the Summit, which tell the story of the career of winter sportsman and singer Hansi Hinterseer and were broadcast on ServusTV.

=== Music & Arts Documentaries ===
In 2015 and 2016, Moonlake Entertainment, in collaboration with ORF and 3sat, produced the film Salzburg – Gesamtkunstwerk in the Heart of Europe. The documentary film, narrated by Jedermann actor Cornelius Obonya, premiered at the Salzburg Festival on the Siemens Festspielbühne on 28 July 2016.

In 2017, he worked as Writer, director and Producer on the Documentation Karajan: The Maestro and his Festival, a Moonlake Entertainment production, coproduced by the Karajan Institute, ORF/ 3sat, Salzburg Easter Festival and Unitel. The film will focus on Herbert von Karajan's work as a conductor, stage director and opera producer and the 2017 staging of Richard Wagner's opera Valkyrie, a reconstruction of his 1967 original. It will the historic and the present production face to face and show the highlights of 50 years Salzburg Easter Festival.

In 2017, Schalle wrote, directed and produced Climb Every Mountain: Sound of Music Revisited and in 2018, he produced and filmed Silent Night – A Song for the World, a global music film about the Christmas carol, featuring performances by Kelly Clarkson and Joss Stone.

== Filmography ==
=== TV productions ===
- "In Search of Beethoven" Executive Producer, Telepiu3, 4 Sequels Documentary
- "The Rakes Progress" Executive Producer, Telepiu3 TV Documentary
- "In Search of Schubert" Executive Producer, Telepiu3, 3 Sequels Documentary
- "Mozarts Courtly Operas" Executive Producer, Telepiu3 Documentary
- "Classic Cuts" Executive Producer, 3 Sat, 12 Sequels Variety Show
- "Il Giardino Armonico" Executive Producer, Warner Classics, 2 Sequels
- "Interface" Executive & Co-Producer, ORF, 9 Sequels TV Magazine
- "Affentour" M.M. Westernhagen Coproducer, Artistic Director Support Act
- "Enter 4 elements" Expo 2000 Composer, Producer & Artistic Codirector
- "Human Waves" Sir Peter Ustinov Memorial, Creative Producer TV / Stage Director
- "Manhunt" Associate Producer, Apollo Media / PRO7,
- "Checkmate" Associate Producer, Apollo Media / PRO7,
- "Vom Ende der Eiszeit" Co-Producer, Alpha Filmtime KG / Ziegler Film / ARD
- "The Secret of Loch Ness" Co-Producer, Alpha Filmtime KG / Rat Pack Film / Sat1
- "Gerry Friedle: Mein Leben mit DJ Ötzi" Writer, Producer, Co-director / Moonlake Entertainment / ORF
- "Der Teufel mit den drei goldenen Haaren" Co-Producer / Neue Provobis / Moonlake Entertainment / ZDF
- "Aus eigener Kraft" Writer / Producer / Director / Moonlake Entertainment / 3sat / ORF
- "Heilig, Rein & Sauber" Producer / Moonlake Entertainment / 3sat / ORF
- "Lust auf die Lust" Producer / Moonlake Entertainment / 3sat / ORF
- "Kathedralen der Flüchtigkeit" Producer / Moonlake Entertainment / 3sat / ORF
- "Im Reich des Regenbogens" Producer / Moonlake Entertainment / 3sat / ORF
- "Muscheln, Münzen, Buchungszeilen" Producer / Moonlake Entertainment / 3sat / ORF
- "Pillen, Pulver, Salben" Producer / Moonlake Entertainment / 3sat / ORF
- "Das Digitale Ich – Menschen, Computer Emotionen" Writer / Director / Producer / Moonlake Entertainment / 3sat / ORF
- "Markt.Macht.Kunst" Writer / Director / Producer Moonlake Entertainment / 3sat / ORF
- "Lauda – The Untold Story" Writer / Director / Producer / Seis Films/ Premiere Picture / Phoenix Worldwide / Bulldog Film / Moonlake Entertainment
- "In Space" Writer / Director / Producer / Seis Films/ Premiere Picture / Peace Point / Moonlake Entertainment
- "The Green Hell" Writer / Director / Producer/ TGH Films / Wentworth Media & Arts / Moonlake Entertainment
- "Salzburg – Gesamtkunstwerk im Herzen Europas" Writer / Director / Producer / Moonlake Entertainment / 3sat / ORF
- "Karajan - The Maestro and his Festival" Writer / Director / Producer / Moonlake Entertainment / 3sat / ORF / Unitel / Sony Music Entertainment
- "Climb Every Mountain - The Sound of Music Revisited" Writer / Director / Producer / Moonlake Entertainment / Servus TV
- "Silent Night - A Song for the World" Writer / Director / Producer / Moonlake Entertainment / The CW / Servus TV / BR / Arte / NDR / Unitel
- "The Magician's Dream" Writer / Director / Moonlake Entertainment / Servus TV
- "Senta Berger Tribute" Writer / Producer / Moonlake Entertainment / Servus TV
- "The Sound of Salzburg" Writer / Director / Moonlake Entertainment / ZDF / ORF / 3sat
- "Beethoven X - The AI Project" Writer / Director / Moonlake Entertainment / MagentaTV / WDR / ARD+ / RTL+
- "Weihnachten in den Alpen" Writer / Director / Moonlake Entertainment / Servus TV
- "My Mozart, My Salzburg" Writer / Director / Moonlake Entertainment / ORF
- "Hansi Hinterseer – Willkommen in meinem Leben" Writer / Director / Moonlake Entertainment / Servus TV
- "Philipp Hochmair – Zwischen Himmel und Hölle" Writer / Director / Moonlake Entertainment / Servus TV
- "Alpentod" Executive Producer / Moonlake Entertainment / Warner Bros. ITV / RTL

=== Film composer ===
- "Die Habsburger" ORF / ZDF (4 Sequels)
- "Ötzi – The Iceman" ORF / Universum / Discovery
- "Star Kid" Trimark Pictures / Warner
- "Hannah" Star*Film / Epo Film (Austrian entry for the foreign language Academy Award 1997)
- "An Almost Perfect Divorce" Star*Film / Buena Vista
- "An Almost Perfect Wedding" Star*Film
- "Classic Cuts" SDP Media / 3sat (11 Sequels)
- "Prince of Central Park" Seagal – Nasso / Warner Bros
- "Interface" enteractivity / ORF (9 Sequels)
- "She, Me & Her" Star*Film / Globe Movie
- "Ein Haufen Kohle" Trebitsch Film / Sat1
- "Manhunt" Apollo Media / PRO7
- "Checkmate" Apollo Media / PRO7
- "Zwei Väter für eine Tochter" Star*Film / ORF / BR
- "Alles Glück dieser Erde" Lisa Film / ORF / ARD
- "Frechheit siegt" Star*Film / ORF / BR
- "Gefühl ist alles" Star*Film / ORF/ BR
- "Da wo die Herzen schlagen" Terra Film / Bavaria / ARD / ORF
- "Wenn der Vater mit dem Sohne" (Titeltrack LaLeLu) Lisa Film / Degeto / ARD / ORF
- "Da wo das Glück beginnt" Terra Film / Degeto / Bavaria / ARD / ORF
- "Die verschwundene Ehefrau" Star*Film / ORF
- "Liebe verleiht Flügel" Satel Film / ARD / ORF
- "König der Herzen" Lisa Film / Degeto / ARD / ORF
- "Liebe ist nicht nur ein Wort" Satel Film / Bavaria Media / ARD / ORF
- "Vom Ende der Eiszeit" Ziegler Film / Alpha Filmtime KG / NDR, ARD
- "Der Teufel mit den drei goldenen Haaren" Neue Provobis / Moonlake Entertainment / ZDF
- "Garmischer Bergspitzen" Neue Provobis / ARD
- "Der Gewaltfrieden von Versailles 1&2" Tellux Film / BR alpha
- "Die Liebe kommt mit dem Christkind" Mona Film / ARD / ORF
- "Aschenputtel" Neue Provobis / SK Film / ZDF
- "Die Konterrevolution" Tellux Film / BR alpha
- "Hitlers Machtergreifung" Tellux Film / BR alpha
- Our Big Time SK Film / BR / Libra Film / Pinguin Film
- "Europas letzter Sommer" Tellux Film / BR alpha
- "Am Weg zur Macht" Tellux Film / BR alpha
- "Die Reichsgründung" Tellux Film / BR alpha
- "Die nervöse Grossmacht" Tellux Film / BR alpha
- "Frei" Tellux Film / Albolina Film / BR
- "Muscheln, Münzen, Buchungszeilen" / Moonlake Entertainment / 3sat / ORF
- "Pillen, Pulver, Salben" / Moonlake Entertainment / 3sat / ORF
- "Das Digitale Ich" / Moonlake Entertainment / 3sat / ORF
- "Markt.Macht.Kunst" / Moonlake Entertainment / 3sat / ORF
- "Lauda – The Untold Story" Seis Films/ Premiere Picture / Phoenix Worldwide / Bulldog Film / Moonlake Entertainment
- "In Space" Seis Films/ Premiere Picture / Peace Point / Moonlake Entertainment
- "The Green Hell" TGH Films / Wentworth Media & Arts / Moonlake Entertainment
- "Salzburg – Gesamtkunstwerk im Herzen Europas" Moonlake Entertainment / 3sat / ORF
- "Silent Night - A Song for the World" Writer / Director / Producer / Moonlake Entertainment / The CW / Servus TV / BR / Arte / NDR / Unitel
- "Karajan – Der Maestro und sein Festival" Moonlake Entertainment / 3sat / ORF / Unitel
- "Climb Every Mountain - The Sound Of Music Revisited" Moonlake Entertainment / ServusTV
- "Stille Nacht - Ein Lied für die Welt" Writer / Director / Moonlake Entertainment / ServusTV / BR / Arte / NDR / Unitel
- "Silent Night - A Song for the World" Writer / Director / Moonlake Entertainment / The CW
- "Weihnachten in den Alpen" Writer / Director / Moonlake Entertainment / Servus TV
- "My Mozart, My Salzburg" Writer / Director / Moonlake Entertainment / ORF
- "Hansi Hinterseer – Willkommen in meinem Leben" Writer / Director / Moonlake Entertainment / Servus TV
- "Philipp Hochmair – Zwischen Himmel und Hölle" Writer / Director / Moonlake Entertainment / Servus TV

=== Commercial director / producer ===
- "Wörthersee Festspiele" Cine Culture Carinthia / Aikon MT
- "F1X-Dubai" Formula 1 Park Dubai / Moonlake Entertainment
- "Salzburg Movies" Land Salzburg / Moonlake Entertainment
- "Salzburg Will Rock you" IOC/ Salzburg Olympic Committee / Aikon MT
- "You Have Colored My Life" Staedtler Colored Pencils / Moonlake Entertainment / Red Angus
- "TEDx Berlin" TEDx Berlin / Moonlake Entertainment / Red Onion
- "Telekom Talks" Telekom AG / Moonlake Entertainment / Red Onion
- "Arts Meets Technology" Samsung / Moonlake Entertainment / Red Onion
- "Metiers d'Art Chanel Salzburg" Chanel / Moonlake Entertainment / Walter Films
- "UBS CIO 2015" UBS / Moonlake Entertainment / Red Onion
- "Star Wars Made Great In Britain" Disney / Feref / Number 10 / Moonlake Entertainment
- "Weinberg" Opening Credits / TNT Serie / Aikon Media Technology
- „BC One Battle of Water Vs Fire" Red Bull Media House / Moonlake Entertainment

== Awards ==
=== Wins ===
- 2007 – Deutscher Fernsehpreis, Best Visual Effects for The Secret of Loch Ness
- 2007 – International Festival for Corporate AV Media FIMAC with a Silver Award for Salzburg Movies – Feel The Inspiration
- 2015 – Chichester International Film Festival, Audience Award for best Documentary for Lauda – 33 Days Born to be Wild
- 2016 – Eyes and Ears Awards Europe, Best Lead in for Weinberg for TNT Serie

=== Nominations ===
- 2007 – Deutscher Fernsehpreis, Best TV Movie for Vom Ende der Eiszeit
- 2008 – Deutscher Fernsehpreis, Best Camera for The Secret of Loch Ness
