= Herbert Wernicke =

German opera director

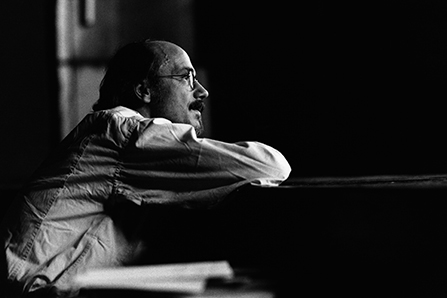
Herbert Wernicke (1987)

Herbert Wernicke (24 March 1946 – 16 April 2002) was a German opera director and a set and costume designer. He was born in Auggen, Baden-Württemberg. He studied piano, flute, and directing at the conservatory in Braunschweig and set design at the academy in Munich. After starting out as set and costume designer in Landshut and Wuppertal, and directing his first play in Darmstadt, he directed his first opera, Handel's Belshazzar, in 1978 in Darmstadt. The majority of Wernicke's artistic work was at the theater in Basel, where he lived since 1990.

On 16 April 2002 Wernicke died unexpectedly at age 56 after a short, serious illness in the hospital in Basel. On 5 May 2002 Theater Basel premiered Israel in Egypt in the fragmentary form left by Wernicke at his death. He was buried in a cemetery in Auggen, his birth city.

== Productions (selection) ==
- Il barbiere di Siviglia (1985, Darmstadt)

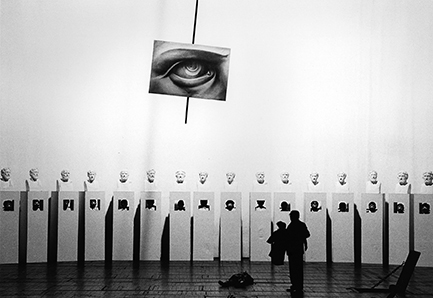
Die Prophezeihung des Goldenen Zeitalters (1984)

- Die Prophezeihung des Goldenen Zeitalters und der Schrecken der Hölle (Florentiner Intermedien) (1984, Staatstheater Kassel)

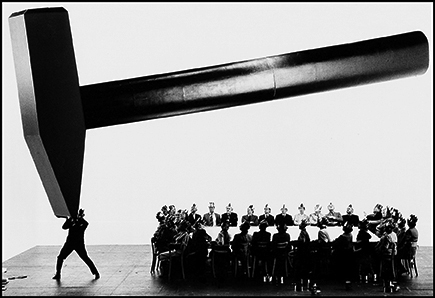
O Ewigkeit, du Donnerwort (1987)

- Barock Trilogie (Phaéton / O Ewigkeit, du Donnerwort (1985–1989, Staatstheater Kassel)
- Judas Maccabaeus (Bavarian State Opera)
- Der fliegende Holländer (Bavarian State Opera)
- Hippolyte et Aricie (Deutsche Oper Berlin)
- Oberon (Deutsche Oper Berlin)
- Moses und Aron (1990, Théâtre du Châtelet)
- Der Ring des Nibelungen (1991, Théâtre de la Monnaie, Brussels; Sylvain Cambreling conducting)
- La Calisto (1993; René Jacobs conducting)
- Orfeo (1993, Salzburg Festival)
- Pelléas et Mélisande (1996, Brussels)
- Boris Godunov (1994, Salzburg Festival in coordination with the Easter plays; Claudio Abbado conducting)
- Der Rosenkavalier (1995, Salzburg Festival; Lorin Maazel conducting)
- Fidelio (1996, Salzburg Festival; Sir Georg Solti conducting)
- Aus Deutschland (From Germany) (by Mauricio Kagel, 1997, co-production of the Theater Basel, the Holland Festival, and the Vienna Festival)
- Entführung im Konzertsaal (Kidnapping in the Concert Hall) (by Mauricio Kagel, Teatro La Fenice in Venice, premiere)
- Orpheus in the Underworld (1997, Théâtre de la Monnaie, Brussels; Elizabeth Vidal as Eurydice, Dale Duesing as Jupiter, Patrick Davin conducting)
- Don Carlo (1998, Salzburg Festival)
- I vespri siciliani (1998, Vienna State Opera)
- Giulio Cesare (1998, Theater Basel, Liceu Barcelona)
- Palestrina (1999, Vienna State Opera)
- Les Troyens (2000, Salzburg Festival)
- Actus Tragicus (Bach) (December 2000, Theater Basel, 2006/07 at Stuttgart State Opera)
- Die Frau ohne Schatten (December 2001, Metropolitan Opera)
- Das Rheingold (2002, Bavarian State Opera)
- Die Walküre (draft, 2002, Bavarian State Opera; Wernicke died 4 weeks before starting rehearsals)
