= Nikolaus Bachler =

Austrian theater and opera director

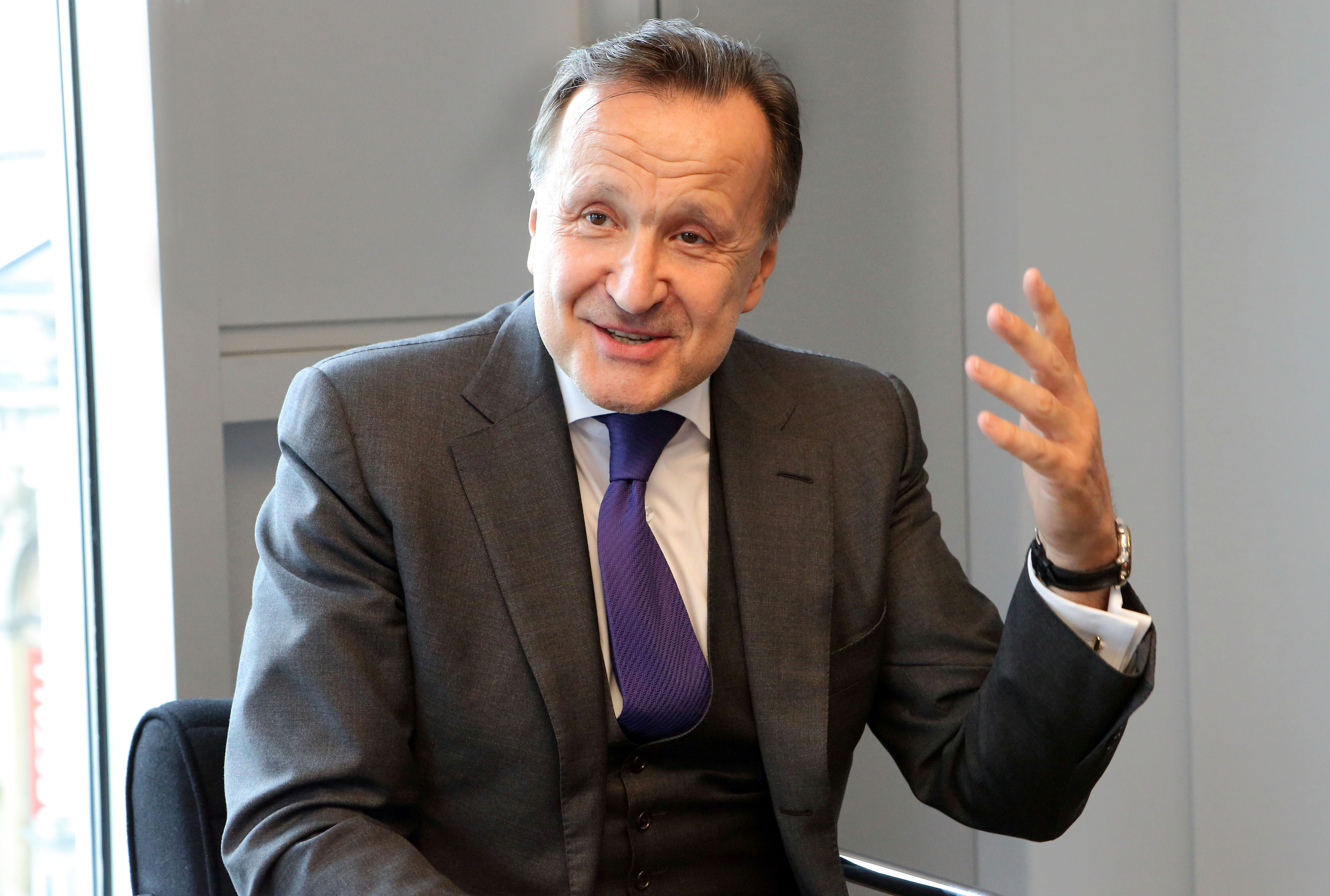
Nikolaus Bachler talking

Nikolaus Bachler, (until 2008 also Klaus Bachler) (born 29 March 1951 in Fohnsdorf, Styria) is an Austrian theater and opera director and actor.

== Life ==
Klaus Bachler first studied acting at the Wiener Max-Reinhardt-Seminar. After graduation he went to the Salzburger Landestheater and was engaged on various German stages. From 1987 to 1990 he was artistic director of the Berlin Schiller Theater and then went to Paris for two years.

In 1992, he returned to Austria and was initially appointed director of the Vienna Festival, (where he initiated the cult piece Alma - Show Biz to the end, among others), then in 1996 he became director of the Vienna Volksoper. In 1999 he took over the Viennese Burgtheater from Claus Peymann.

At the beginning of the 2008/2009 season Klaus Bachler took over the directorship of the Bavarian State Opera in Munich. Since then, he went back to using his birth name, Nikolaus Bachler.

== Activity at the Burgtheater ==
Bachler's direction was a paradigm shift for the Burgtheater, compared to the direction of his predecessor. Bachler was a cultural manager-director, moving the theater to the forefront, not like his predecessor Peymann, a warlike director. He engaged directors such as Luc Bondy, Andrea Breth, and Peter Zadek.

He understood theater to have a certain social responsibility. In 2007 he launched the initiative "Free theater!", for which school classes were offered the opportunity to attend select performances free of charge.

The program included modern as well as classical pieces in different stagings. He established the venues "Vestibule" and "Casino" as spaces for experimental theater and new approaches.

Klaus Bachler placed a thematic emphasis on the Shakespeare cycle, which ran until 2008, in which modern interpretations of classical Shakespeare plays, readings, and lectures examined the work and time of Shakespeare and its effects on the contemporary age.

Other highlights were the MTV Unplugged concerts by Die Toten Hosen, released on the album Nur zu Besuch in 2005.

== Bayerische Staatsoper ==
In 2008 Nikolaus Bachler took over the direction of the Bayerische Staatsoper. He continued the artistic vision of his Burgtheater years, hiring opera directors such as Hans Neuenfels, Dmitri Tcherniakov, Martin Kušej, Krzysztof Warlikowski, and Calixto Bieito, as well as drama directors like David Bösch, Andreas Kriegenburg, and Antú Romero Nunes, who presented their first opera productions there. He led new interpretations of Wagner's Der Ring des Nibelungen in 2012 and the world premieres of Peter Eötvös' Die Tragödie des Teufels (2010), Miroslav Srnka's Make No Noise (2011), Jörg Widmann's Babylon (2012), and Srnka's South Pole.

At the beginning of the 2013/14 season, Nikolaus Bachler appointed the conductor Kirill Petrenko as general music director.

== Other ==
Bachler is a member of the Broadcasting Council of the Bavarian Radio, as a representative of the directorship of Bavarian state theaters. The Vienna Burgtheater awarded him an honorary membership in 2009.
