= Vera Nemirova =

Bulgarian-German opera director

Vera Nemirova Вера Немирова
- Born: 1972 (age 53–54); Sofia, Bulgaria
- Education: Hochschule für Musik Hanns Eisler
- Occupation: Opera director
- Awards: Berliner Kunstpreis

Vera Nemirova (Bulgarian: Вера Немирова, born 1972) is a Bulgarian-German opera director who has worked at major opera houses in Europe, staging productions at the Vienna State Opera, Deutsche Oper Berlin, Semperoper, Oper Frankfurt, the Salzburg Festival and the Munich Biennale.

== Career ==
Born in Sofia, Nemirova has lived in Germany since 1982. She studied directing music theatre (Musiktheaterregie) at the Hochschule für Musik Hanns Eisler in Berlin, taking master classes with Ruth Berghaus and Peter Konwitschny.

Nemirova staged Puccini's La fanciulla del West at the Deutsche Oper Berlin in 2004. The production featured singers including José Cura, Sylvie Valayre and Alexandru Agache.

At the Vienna State Opera, she staged Tchaikovsky's The Queen of Spades (Pique Dame) in 2007. Performances and revivals of the production were conducted by Valery Gergiev, Timur Zangiev and Michael Güttler. Revivals featured singers including Anna Netrebko, Yusif Eyvazov, Olga Borodina, Elena Guseva, Elena Zaremba, Dmitry Golovnin, Boris Pinkhasovich, Alexey Markov and Monika Bohinec.

She directed Verdi's Macbeth at the Vienna State Opera in 2009 and staged Alban Berg's Lulu at the Salzburg Festival in 2010.

From 2010 to 2012, she staged Wagner's Der Ring des Nibelungen at the Oper Frankfurt.

In 2015, she directed Peter Ruzicka's Hölderlin and Meyerbeer's Vasco da Gama, the original version of L'Africaine, at the Deutsche Oper Berlin. In 2016, she staged Wagner's Die Meistersinger von Nürnberg at the Theater Erfurt.

Other major European opera houses where she worked have included the Gran Teatre del Liceu in Barcelona, Staatsoper Berlin, Theater Magdeburg, the Romanian National Opera, Bucharest, Theater Freiburg, Graz Opera, Hamburg State Opera, and the Luzerner Theater.

She staged Weber's Euryanthe and Verdi's Otello at the Semperoper in Dresden, Hèctor Parra's Das geopferte Leben for the Munich Biennale, Mozart's Idomeneo, Verdi's La traviata and Puccini's La bohème at the Staatstheater Mainz, Verdi's Macbeth, Gounod's Faust and Wagner's Tristan und Isolde at the Bonn Opera, Puccini's Tosca and Ruzicka's Celan at the Theater Bremen, and Mozart's Le nozze di Figaro at the Latvian National Opera in Riga.

In Bulgaria, Nemirova staged Shostakovich's Katerina Izmailova at the State Opera Rousse in 2015 and Strauss's Der Rosenkavalier there in 2017, both conducted by Nayden Todorov. Nemirova also worked regularly with the State Opera Varna. She directed Tchaikovsky's The Queen of Spades (Pique Dame) for the Varna Summer International Music Festival in a production conducted by Pavel Baleff.

She staged Wagner's Der fliegende Holländer at the State Opera Varna in 2023 and 2024, conducted by Svetoslav Borisov and Rossen Gergov, with singers including Deyan Vatchkov, Sofia Soloviy, Linka Stoyanova and Valeriy Georgiev.

In 2025, she directed a new production of Gounod's Faust at the State Opera Varna, conducted by Svetoslav Borisov, with singers including Arthur Espiritu, Reinaldo Droz, Deyan Vatchkov and Martin Tsonev.

She also directed Kálmán's operetta Countess Maritza at the State Opera Varna, conducted by Stefan Boyadzhiev.

== Awards ==
The Academy of the Arts in Berlin awarded the Berliner Kunstpreis (Berlin Art Prize) of 2006 to Nemirova.

== Publications ==
- Die Katze Ivanka, in: Katzenmusik und Katerstimmung: Tierisch-musikalische Geschichten, edited by Elke Heidenreich and illustrated by Rudi Hurzlmeier, Bertelsmann, München 2012, ISBN 978-3-570-58036-3
