= Cultural subsidy =

Government payment to preserve, maintain, or promote an aspect of culture

A cultural subsidy is a payment from the government to specific cultural industries to ensure that some public policy purpose in culture (e.g. multiculturalism, bilingualism, minority and languages, and preservation of traditional dance, music, food, art or other practices) are preserved and maintained in society. Cultural subsidies work similarly to other forms of subsidies such as industrial and consumer subsidies and have similar goals of expansionary economic results and increased utility for their targeted recipients.

== Implementation ==
Cultural subsidies are distributed in the form of grants and payment from the government to various institutions, groups or citizens who are seen to meaningfully contribute to their society's culture. Some of the most familiar efforts are: free museum entrances for children and seniors, public art instalments, government funding for afterschool art-based programs and government grants to culturally focused non-profits.

A common emphasis for cultural subsidies is the provision of resources for underserved communities or groups, whose cultural background and heritage may be at risk without additional financial support, or who traditionally lack access to mainstream cultural events and participation. For example, the National Endowment for the Arts states that 40% of their activities support high-poverty neighbourhoods, 36% of their grants are awarded to organisations that serve those with disabilities, in institutions and veterans, while 33% of their grants are awarded to serve low-income audiences.

== Cultural subsidy implementation in the US ==
The National Council for the Arts was established by US President Lyndon B. Johnson through the National Arts and Cultural Development Act of 1964 and is the US federal program which provides cultural subsidies. Its purpose is to review and recommend applications for grants, funding guidelines and leadership initiatives in the US. to the Chairman of the National Endowment for the Arts. There are eighteen Presidentially appointed members of the council, with six additional members of Congress serving two-year, non-voting terms. Members are selected for their extensive knowledge, expertise and interest in the arts as well as outstanding backgrounds in service or recognition within the arts.

The annual budget for the National Council for the Arts is set by Congress and currently receives .004% of the total, or US$149.8 million. 40% of their grant budget is directly received by states via regional arts agencies who distribute the funds, with stipulations that every state and regional partnership allocates a portion of funding for underserved communities. Direct awards to organisations and individuals who apply through the National Endowment for the Arts make up the remaining 60% of their annual budget.

== Intended economic effects ==
Like other subsidies, cultural subsidies are utilized with the intent to expand economic growth and utility within a specific area. The functionality of cultural subsidies can be seen through typical supply and demand graphs like those pictured below.

As prices for arts and culture related items, events and classes increase, the demand for them decreases. On the other hand, as prices increase, the supply also increases as more artists and cultural entities seek gains. Where the two forces of supply and demand meet is the equilibrium point (e^{1}).

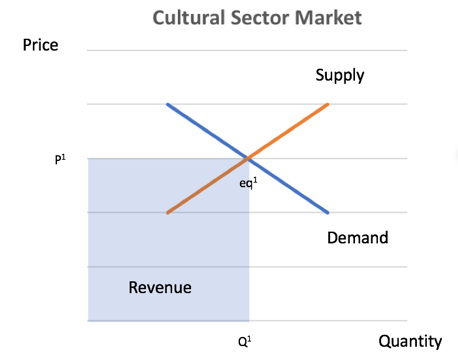

When cultural subsidies are applied from the demand-side that means they focus on growing the demand from consumers for art and culture related products. This most often is reflected in free or discounted ticket sales for art and culture events and purchases for pieces of art that consumers would otherwise not be able to buy due to budget constraints. The ultimate goal in utilising demand-side cultural subsidies is to increase the demand for art at every price level it is offered. Below, we can see the result is an outward shift of the demand curve to the right, and an increase in both the equilibrium supply and demand (e^{1} to e^{2}). The difference from P^{1} to P^{2} is the amount which is compensated by the subsidy, and the total area of from P^{2}, e^{2} and Q^{2} is the cultural sector's revenue. Demand-side subsidies are typically viewed as an effective way to increase both the output of the cultural sector and increase incomes for the providers within it.

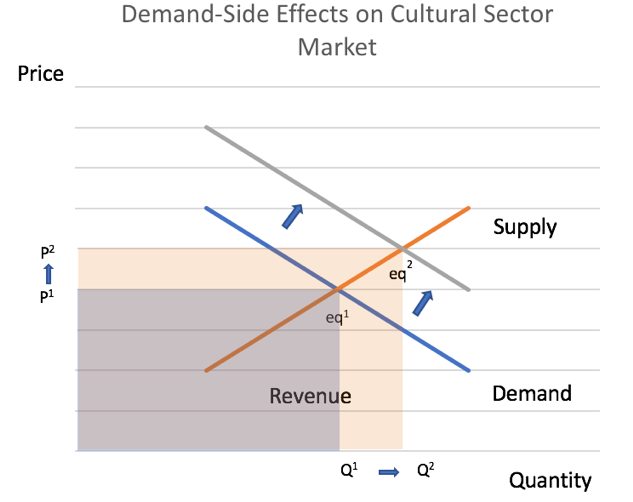

Governments can also approach cultural subsidies from the supply-side in an effort to increase the economic power of those who supply cultural products. This allows cultural providers the opportunity to produce and supply more than they would be able to without subsidised assistance. Instead of raising both the price and quantity of cultural products, as the demand-side subsidies do, supply-side subsidies lower price while increasing quantity, as show in the model below. Supply shifts downward, to the right and the new equilibrium moves from e^{1} to e^{2}. Total revenue shifts from the blue rectangle to the red rectangle, which demonstrates an expansion of cultural sector output (Q^{1} to Q^{2}), but not necessarily an increase in economic growth.

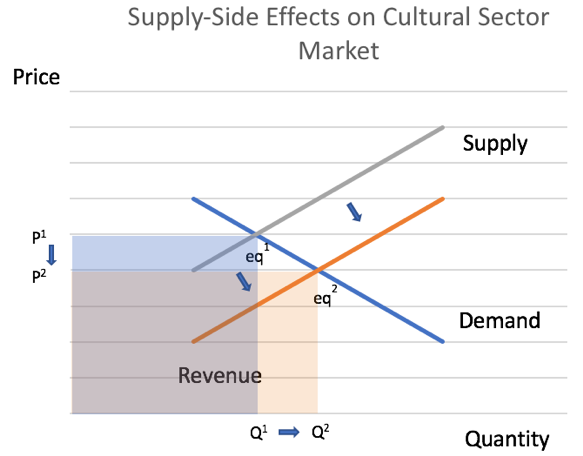

== Issues facing cultural subsidies ==
As with other sectors reliant on subsidies, the cultural sector is constantly subject to the budget decisions made by the government. In the US, government subsidies for arts and culture have steadily been declining as spending emphasis shifts elsewhere. Cultural providers are forced to turn to state and private philanthropic groups and individuals for greater and greater percentages of their funding.

In 2017, the Donald Trump administration proposed to eliminate the National Endowment for the Arts, the US grant-making organization responsible for cultural subsidy provision. The main argument behind this comes from the private taxation of citizens to fund the program. Policymakers in favour of reduced taxes often view cultural subsidies as a non-necessary expense, and one which should be privately, versus publicly funded.

Opinions on the importance of cultural subsidies vary widely by each nation, as well as the levels of investment in cultural products by consumers and cultural professions by suppliers. In Australia, there is a current over-supply in the cultural sector which has been supported through supply-side subsidies from the government. This issue, paired with a drastic increase in the number of cultural professionals in the early 2000s, has been blamed for steadily declining salaries for cultural suppliers. Advocates for reform are stressing the importance of demand-side policies in the country as an alternative way to increase artist salary and most importantly, increase demand for the large supply of cultural products available.

== See also ==
- Arts grant
- Cultural policy
