= Peter Ruzicka =

German composer and conductor

Peter Ruzicka (born 3 July 1948) is a German composer and conductor of classical music. He was director of the Hamburg State Opera, the Philharmonic Orchestra of Hamburg and the Salzburg Festival. Ruzicka was managing director and Intendant of the Salzburg Easter Festival and is professor at the Hochschule für Musik und Theater Hamburg. The list of his compositions includes numerous orchestral and chamber music works as well as the opera "Celan", about the poet Paul Celan, which was premiered in Dresden in 2001. His opera "Hölderlin" had its premiere at the Berlin State Opera in 2008. Ruzicka's third opera "Benjamin", about the philosopher Walter Benjamin, was written in 2015/16 for the Hamburg State Opera and premiered in 2018.

== Biography ==
Ruzicka was born in Düsseldorf. He received his early musical training (piano, oboe and composition) at the Hamburg Conservatory. He studied composition with Hans Werner Henze and Hans Otte. He studied law and musicology in Munich, Hamburg and Berlin (interdisciplinary doctoral thesis: Die Problematik eines "ewigen Urheberpersönlichkeitsrechts", Berlin, 1977).

Ruzicka was artistic director of the Berlin Radio Symphony Orchestra from 1979 to 1987 and indendant of the Hamburg State Opera and the Philharmonic Orchestra of Hamburg from 1988 to 1997. Moreover, he was Artistic Advisor of the Royal Concertgebouw Orchestra in Amsterdam from 1997 to 1999. In 1999 he was named President of the Bavarian Theatre Academy. From 2001 to 2006, Ruzicka took over the Artistic Directorship of the Salzburg Festival. Ruzicka served as artistic director of the Munich Biennale between 1996 and 2014. He took over from Hans Werner Henze, and was succeeded by the dual directorship of Manos Tsangaris and Daniel Ott. Ruzicka was managing director and Intendant of the Salzburg Easter Festival from 2015 to 2020.

Ruzicka was appointed professor for cultural management at the Hochschule für Musik und Theater Hamburg in 1990. The composer is member of the Bavarian Academy of Fine Arts in Munich and of the Free Academy of Arts in Hamburg.

Ruzicka's works have been performed by leading international orchestras and ensembles like the Berlin Philharmonic Orchestra, the Vienna Philharmonic Orchestra, Symphony Orchestra of the Bavarian Radio Munich, German Symphony Orchestra Berlin, Bamberg Symphony Orchestra, Tonhalle Orchestra Zurich, Philharmonia Orchestra London, Orchestre de Paris, Czech Philharmony, Radio Symphony Orchestra Vienna, Israel Philharmonic Orchestra, Symphony Orchestra Montréal and the New York Philharmonic Orchestra. Conductors like Gerd Albrecht, Vladimir Ashkenazy, Semyon Bychkov, Riccardo Chailly, Christoph Eschenbach, Michael Gielen, Paavo Järvi, Mariss Jansons, Kurt Masur, Antonio Pappano, Giuseppe Sinopoli and Christian Thielemann have performed his works.

As a conductor Ruzicka has directed the German Symphony Orchestra in Berlin – recording CD productions of works by Mahler, Pettersson and Schreker – the Royal Concertgebouw Orchestra, the Sächsische Staatskapelle Dresden, the Gewandhausorchester Leipzig, the Bavarian Radio Symphony Orchestra, the NDR Symphony Orchestra Hamburg – recording a cycle of 12 orchestral works by Henze –, and the Munich Philharmonic amongst others. Ruzicka has also conducted three CDs of music by George Enescu for the cpo label.

== Works ==
Ruzicka's works are published by Hans Sikorski.

=== Stage ===
- Celan, Musiktheater in sieben Entwürfen (1998–1999)
- Hölderlin, Eine Expedition (2007)
- Benjamin, Musiktheater in sieben Stationen (2015–2016)

=== Orchestra ===
- Metamorphosen über ein Klangfeld von Joseph Haydn for Large Orchestra (1990)
- "... das Gesegnete, das Verfluchte ...", 4 Orchestra Sketches (1991)
- Tallis (1993)
- Nachtstück (1997)
- "... Vorgefühle ..." (1998)
- Nachklang (1999)
- Memorial (2001)
- Affluence (2003)
- "... ins Offene ...", Music for 22 Strings (2005–2006)
- Vorecho, 8 Rudiments (2005)
- Maelstrom (2007)
- "...Zurücknehmen..." (2009)
- Mahler – Bild for orchestra (2010)
- "Trans" for chamber ensemble (2010)
- Clouds for orchestra and string quartet (2012/13)
- "Zwei Übermalungen (Über Unstern, R.W.") (2010–2012)

=== Concertante ===
- "...den Impuls zum Weitersprechen erst empfinge...", Music for Viola and Orchestra (1981)
- "...Inseln, randlos ..." for Violin, Chamber Chorus and Orchestra (1994–1995)
- Erinnerung for Clarinet and Orchestra (2001)
- ...Über die Grenze for Cello and Chamber Orchestra (2009)
- "Spiral" for horn quartet and orchestra (2013)

=== Chamber music ===
- ... über ein Verschwinden, String Quartet No.3 (1992)
- "... sich verlierend" for String Quartet and Narrator (1996)
- Tombeau for Flute (Alto Flute, Bass Flute) and String Quartet (2000)
- Sturz for String Quartet (2004)
- Nachschrift, 3 Pieces for Cello and Piano (2008)
- Erinnerung und Vergessen, String Quartet No.6 with Soprano (2008)

=== Vocal ===
- Acht Gesänge nach Fragmenten von Nietzsche (8 Songs after Fragments of Nietzsche) for Mezzo-Soprano (or Baritone) and Piano (1992)
- Die Sonne sinkt, 8 Songs after Fragments of Nietzsche for Baritone (or Mezzo-soprano) and Orchestra (1997–2000)
- Recherche (-im Innersten) for Chorus and Orchestra (1998)
- Celan Symphonie for Baritone, Mezzo-Soprano and Orchestra (2002)
- "... und möchtet Ihr an mich die Hände legen ...", 5 Fragments by Hölderlin for Baritone and Piano (2006–2007)

=== Piano ===
- Parergon, 7 Sketches to Hölderlin (2006)
- Five Scenes for Piano (2009)

== Honors and awards ==
- 1969: Prize of the city of Stuttgart
- 1970: Composition Prize at the International Composition Competition "Bela Bartók", Budapest
- 1971: UNESCO prize of the International Rostrum of Composers
- 1972: Winner of the "International Gaudeamus Composition Competition", Hilversum
- 1972: Bach Prize Fellowship of the Free and Hanseatic City of Hamburg
- 1997: Honorary membership of the Hamburg State Opera
- 2004: Louis Spohr Prize of the City of Braunschweig
- 2005: Johannes Gutenberg Endowed Professorship at the University of Mainz
- 2005: Honorary Membership Deutsches Symphonie-Orchester, Berlin
- 2005: Honorary Membership German Music Council, a member of the International Music Council
- 2006: Austrian Cross of Honour for Science and Art, 1st class
- 2006: Golden Medal of Honour of Salzburg
- 2006: Gold Coat of Arms Medal of the City of Salzburg
- 2006: Silver Medal at the International Mozarteum Foundation
- 2006: Prize "New Hearing" for successful placement of contemporary music, Munich
- 2007: Chancellor Award of the International Salzburg Association
- 2008: Honorary Doctorate of the Academy of Music and Theatre in Hamburg
- 2008: Medal of the Free Academy of Arts in Hamburg
