= Günther Schneider-Siemssen =

German-born Austrian scenic designer

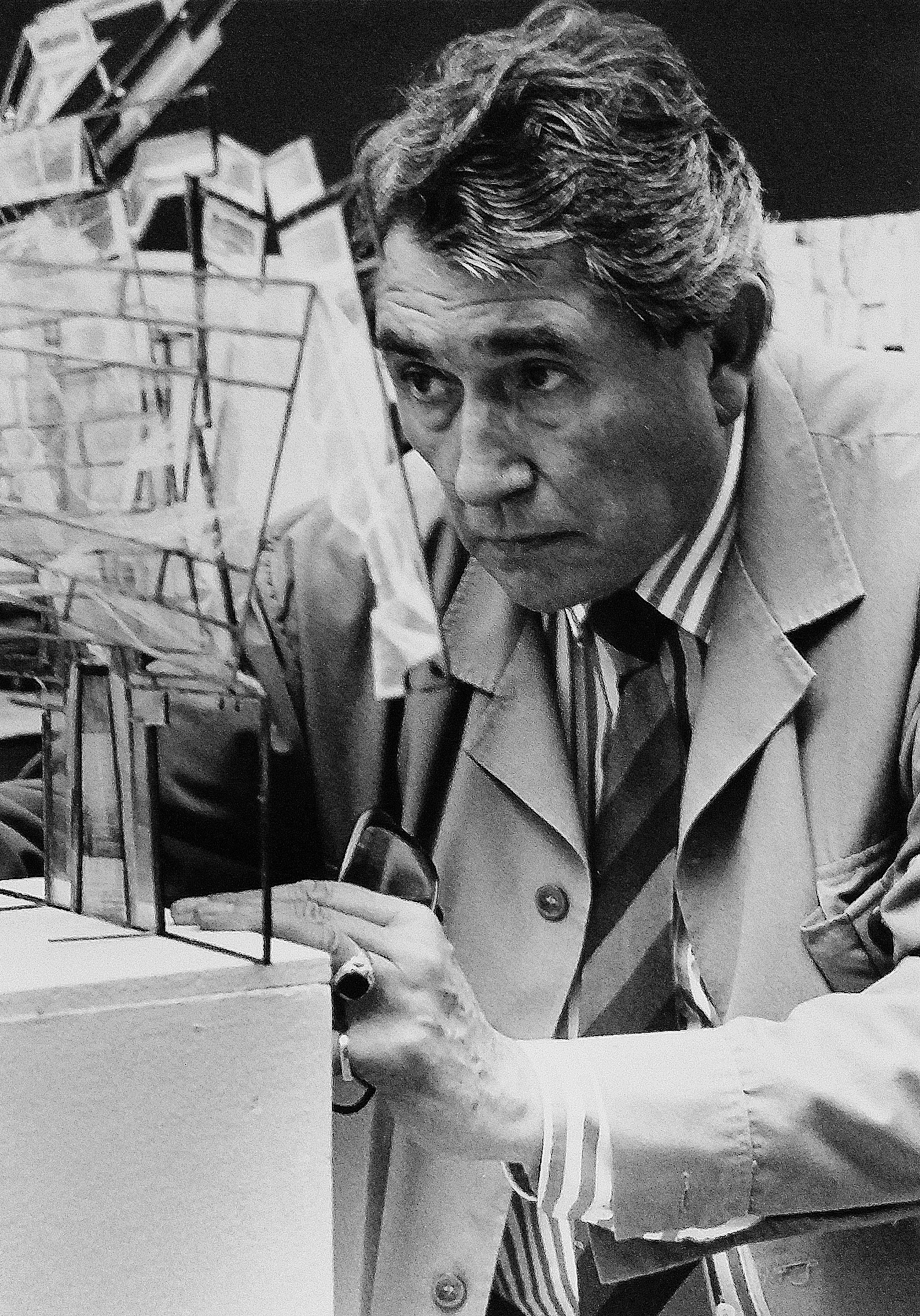
- Günther Schneider-Siemssen at work
- Born: Günther Schneider; 7 June 1926; Augsburg, Germany
- Died: 2 June 2015 (aged 88); Vienna, Austria
- Education: Akademie der Bildenden Künste München
- Occupation: Scenic designer
- Organizations: Vienna State Opera; Salzburg Festival

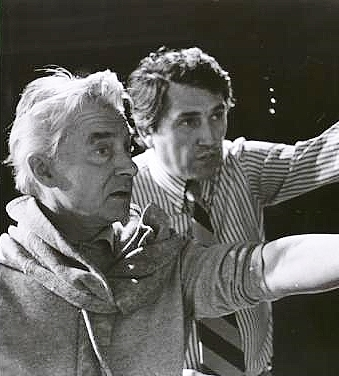
With Herbert von Karajan (left) at a rehearsal

Günther Schneider-Siemssen (7 June 1926 – 2 June 2015) was a German-born Austrian scenic designer, working as the chief designer for all Austrian State Theatres and the Salzburg Festival, where he created 28 productions for Herbert von Karajan and 60 for Otto Schenk. He was a pioneer in using lighting and projections on stage. He designed sets for major international opera houses.

== Career ==
Born Günther Schneider in Augsburg, he later adopted his second name, Siemssen, from his maternal grandfather. He spent his childhood and youth in Munich, originally wanting to become a conductor. In a job interview with Clemens Krauss he was advised against this and was instead recommended to train in set designing. He studied set design at the Akademie der Bildenden Künste München.

From 1951 to 1954, Schneider-Siemssen was the head stage designer of the Salzburger Landestheater, and was simultaneously also in charge of the Salzburger Marionettentheater. From 1954, he was the head stage designer of the Theater Bremen. From 1960, he was employed at the Vienna State Opera under Herbert von Karajan, where their first production was Pelléas et Mélisande. From 1962 to 1986 he was the chief stage designer for the Austrian Federal Theatres, including the Opera, Volksoper and Burgtheater with the Akademietheater. From 1965, he held the position also for the Salzburg Festival. He created numerous style-defining stage designs. As a guest, he worked at the Metropolitan Opera in New York City, and in opera houses of other U.S. cities and of Canada, South America, Israel and South Africa.

A key feature of his designs was his use of lighting. He pioneered and developed a symbolic style of using hand-painted projections and sophisticated special effects, working with the company Pani. For a production of Offenbach's Hoffmann's Erzählungen at the Salzburger Marionettentheater in 1985, he brought holographic technology to use on stage for the first time.

He designed 28 productions for Karajan and 60 for Otto Schenk, and worked also with directors such as August Everding, Götz Friedrich and Peter Ustinov. For his expressive interpretations of Wagner's stage works, he received the Anton Seidl Award from the Wagner Society of New York in 2009, for a 1986 production of Wagner's Der Ring des Nibelungen at the Metropolitan Opera, staged by Schenk and conducted by James Levine, which remained in the repertoire of the house to 2009. It was presented in live broadcasts in 1990.

== Personal life ==
Schneider-Siemssen became an Austrian citizen in 1973, living in Vienna and Seeham near Salzburg. He was married and had four children. Schneider-Siemssen died in Vienna after long term sickness just prior to his 89th birthday and was buried in the Vienna Central Cemetery in an honorary grave (Group 40, Number 187).

== Literature ==
- Kurt Becsi (ed.), Die Bühne als kosmischer Raum. Zum Bühnenbildschaffen by G. Schneider-Siemssen. Vienna, 1976
- Josef Mayerhöfer (ed.), G. Schneider-Siemssen. 30 Jahre Bühnenschaffen. 1977 ISBN 3-85376-015-5 und ISBN 3-85376-015-5.
- Günther Schneider-Siemssen: Die Bühne – Mein Leben. Vienna 1998, ISBN 3-90135-311-9.

== Awards ==
- 1987: Medal of Honour of Vienna in Gold
- 1998: Austrian Decoration for Science and Art
- 2009: Anton Seidl Award“ from the Wagner Society of New York
