= Desderi =

Desderi is an Italian surname. Notable people with the surname include:

- Claudio Desderi (1943–2018), Italian baritone and conductor
- Elena Desderi (born 1967), Italian cross-country skier
- Ettore Desderi (1892–1974), Italian composer

== See also ==
- Desideri
