= Gianni Raimondi =

Italian opera singer (1923–2008)

Gianni Raimondi, ca. 1955

Gianni Raimondi (17 April 1923 – 19 October 2008) was an Italian lyric tenor, particularly associated with the Italian repertory.

Born in Bologna, Raimondi studied at the Conservatorio Giovanni Battista Martini in his native city with Antonio Melandri, and Gennaro Barra-Caracciolo and in Mantua with Ettore Campogalliani. He made his stage debut in 1947 in Rigoletto at the Teatro Consorziale in Budrio, a small town near Bologna. The following year he made his debut at the Teatro Comunale di Bologna, as Ernesto in Donizetti's Don Pasquale.

After singing throughout Italy (notably in Florence, in a rare 1952 revival of Rossini's Armida, opposite Maria Callas), he made guest appearances in Nice, Marseille, Monte-Carlo, Paris, and London. His La Scala début occurred in 1956, as Alfredo in La Traviata, again opposite Callas, in the famed Luchino Visconti production. He took part in another famous Visconti-Callas production, as Percy in Donizetti's Anna Bolena, in 1957. Later he participated in many important revivals at La Scala, including two Rossini works: Mosè in Egitto in 1958, and Semiramide, opposite Joan Sutherland, in 1962. In particular he was much appreciated for his skill with high-lying lyric tenor roles such as Arnoldo in Rossini's Guglielmo Tell, Arturo in Bellini's I Puritani, Fernando in yet another Donizetti piece, La favorita, Edgardo in Lucia di Lammermoor, and the Duke in Rigoletto.

In 1957 Raimondi made his debut at the Vienna State Opera where he continued to perform until 1977. There he sang Alfredo (La traviata), the Duke (Rigoletto), Cavaradossi (Tosca), Pinkerton (Madama Butterfly), and Riccardo (Un ballo in maschera). In 1963 he was Rodolfo to Mirella Freni's Mimí in Franco Zeffirelli's legendary production of La bohème, with Herbert von Karajan conducting.

His American debut was at the San Francisco Opera in 1957; he also appeared at the Teatro Colón in Buenos Aires, in 1959. He made his Metropolitan Opera début on 29 September 1965 as Rodolfo in La bohème, opposite another débutante, Mirella Freni. He sang Cavaradossi (Tosca) opposite Birgit Nilsson at Metropolitan Opera in November 19, 1968 . Other roles at the Met included Edgardo, Faust in the Gounod opera (this being among his few ventures into non-Italian vocal territory), and Pinkerton (Madame Butterfly).

During the 1970s, Raimondi expanded his repertory and added roles such as Pollione in Norma, and Gennaro in yet another Donizetti piece, Lucrezia Borgia, in which role he appeared opposite Leyla Gencer and Montserrat Caballé. He also appeared in some of Verdi's less frequently performed operas such as I masnadieri, I Vespri Siciliani, and Simon Boccanegra.

Raimondi made disappointingly few studio recordings, given the length of his career and the sheer number of internationally distinguished opera houses where he sang. Even recorded versions of his live performances are not as frequent as they could and should have been. The most famous of his surviving recorded interpretations is probably La Traviata, opposite Maria Callas and Ettore Bastianini, under Carlo Maria Giulini. He also appeared in a film version of La bohème with Freni, and conducted by Karajan. Among his live performances, his L'amico Fritz with Freni, Rolando Panerai, and Gavazzeni on the podium (La Scala, 1963) well demonstrates the dramatic and vocal effect that he had on the stage.

Gianni Raimondi was married to the Italian soprano Gianna Dal Sommo and in retirement spent much of his time at his seaside villa in Riccione. He died at his home in Pianoro near Bologna at the age of 85.

== Selected Recordings ==
- Donizetti - Anna Bolena - Maria Callas, Giulietta Simionato, Gianni Raimondi, Nicola Rossi Lemeni - Coro e Orchestra del Teatro all Scala, Gianandrea Gavazzeni - EMI (1957)
- Donizetti - La favorita - Fedora Barbieri, Gianni Raimondi, Carlo Tagliabue, Giulio Neri - Coro e Orchestra della Rai Torino, Angelo Questa - Warner-Fonit (1955)
- Donizetti - Linda di Chamounix - Margherita Carosio, Gianni Raimondi, Giuseppe Taddei, Giuseppe Modesti, Rina Corsi, Carlo Badioli - Coro e Orchestra della Rai Milano, Alfredo Simonetto - Walhall Eternity Series (1953)
- Bellini - I puritani - Anna Moffo, Gianni Raimondi, Ugo Savarese, Raffaele Arié - Coro e Orchestra della Rai Milano, Mario Rossi - MYTO (1959)
- Verdi - La traviata - Renata Scotto, Gianni Raimondi, Ettore Bastianini - Coro e Orchestra del Teatro alla Scala, Antonino Votto - DG (1962)
- Gounod - "Faust" - Gianni Raimondi, Nicolai Ghiaurov, Mirella Freni, Luigi Alva - Orchestra and Chorus of La Scala, Milan Georges Prêtre 1967 Bravissimo (Allegro)

== Notes and references ==
- Forbes, Elizabeth "Gianni Raimondi: Tenor who sang with Maria Callas during a long career at La Scala", The Independent, 27 October 2008. Accessed 27 October 2008.
- Roland Mancini and Jean-Jacques Rouveroux, (orig. H. Rosenthal and J. Warrack, French edition), Guide de l’opéra, Les indispensables de la musique (Fayard, 1995). ISBN 2-213-59567-4
- The Times, "Gianni Raimondi: tenor who frequently appeared with Callas", October 25, 2008. Accessed 27 October 2008.

Biography

- Daniele Rubboli, Gianni Raimondi: Felicemente tenore, Parma: Azzali, 1992
