= Rosa Feola =

Italian operatic soprano (born 1986)

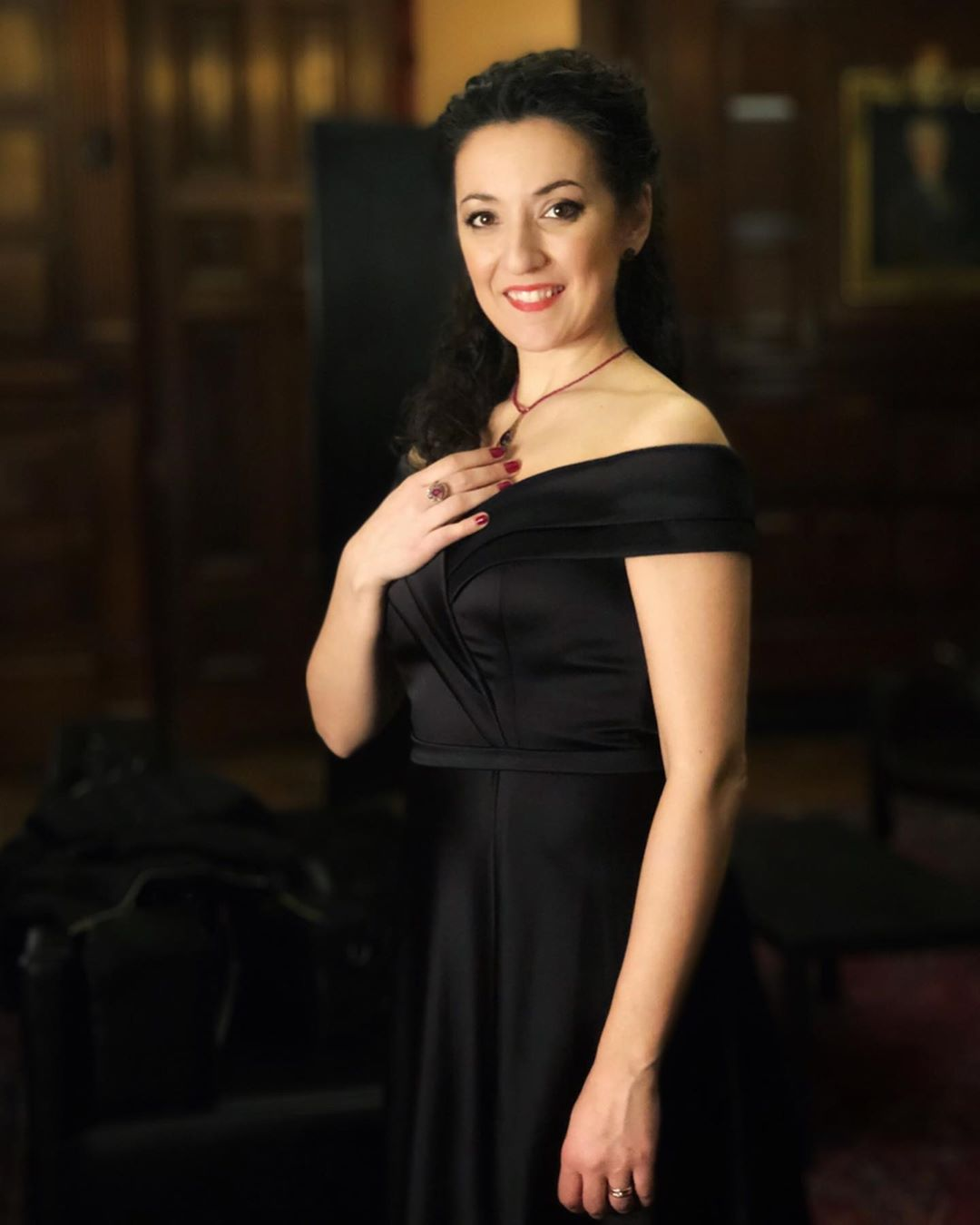
- Rosa Feola, 2020

Background information
- Born: 21 May 1986 (age 40); San Nicola la Strada, Caserta, Italy
- Genre: opera
- Occupation: soprano
- Years active: 2009–present

Rosa Feola (born 21 May 1986) is an Italian operatic soprano.

== Early life and training ==
Feola was born and grew up in San Nicola la Strada, Caserta (Italy), in a music-loving family. At about 5, she had her first piano lesson with a cousin, and at around 6, she began to sing in coro dell'Accademia musicale di San Nicola and later the church choir. Having studied with Mara Naddei, in 2008 she graduated in singing with a first-class honors degree from Salerno's Conservatorio Giuseppe Martucci. She continued her studies at the Accademia Nazionale di Santa Cecilia's Opera Studio attending master classes by Renata Scotto, Anna Vandi, and Cesare Scarton.

== Career ==
Feola made her operatic debut in the role of Corinna (Il viaggio a Reims) under Kent Nagano at the Santa Cecilia Academy at age 23. She came to international attention winning Second Prize, the Zarzuela Prize and the Rolex Audience Prize at Plácido Domingo's Operalia 2010.

In the following year, she made her role debuts / house debuts as Adina (L'elisir d'amore) at Teatro dell'Opera di Roma, Susanna (Le nozze di Figaro) at Teatro La Fenice, and Micaëla (Carmen) at Deutsche Oper Berlin. Most significant was singing the role of Inez in the modern premiere of Mercadante's I due Figaro under Riccardo Muti with whom she has maintained a longtime collaboration since then. The performances at Ravenna Festival were recorded live and later released on the Ducale label.

In 2012, she made her US debut with Chicago Symphony Orchestra at Millennium Park singing the soprano part of Carmina Burana under Muti, and later made her Carnegie Hall debut in its season-opening concert with CSO and Muti with the same program. In the same year, at Ravenna Festival, in a production directed by Cristina Mazzavillani Muti, Feola made her role debut of Gilda (Rigoletto), a signature role of hers, which has served as the vehicle for her house debuts at Opernhaus Zürich (2013), Bayerische Staatsoper (2015), Lyric Opera of Chicago (2017, her US stage opera debut), and the Metropolitan Opera (2019).

In 2014, she made her Wigmore Hall debut in the Rosenblatt Recital Series with pianist Iain Burnside.

2015 and 2016 were her breakthrough years. Her appearance as Elvira in Welsh National Opera's new production I puritani won her rave reviews—she was honored as "Best Female in an Opera Production" at the Wales Theatre Awards and cited for outstanding achievement in Great Britain's What's On Stage Opera Poll 2016. The year of 2015 also saw the release of her first solo album, Musica e Poesia, on the Opus Arte label, with selections by such composers as Ottorino Respighi, Giuseppe Martucci, Amilcare Ponchielli, Ciro Pinsuti, and Franz Liszt. The recording was selected as an editor's choice in the March issue of Gramophone and shortlisted for the Solo Vocal category of 2016 Gramophone Classical Music Awards. She was shortlisted as the best female singer of the International Opera Awards 2016, alongside Anna Bonitatibus, Mariella Devia, Christine Goerke, Evelyn Herlitzius, and Anna Netrebko. In 2016, she also sang the role of Nannetta (Falstaff) in concert performances of Chicago Symphony Orchestra under Muti as part of the citywide Shakespeare 400 Celebration, made her US recital debut in San Francisco, made Proms debut singing concert arias by Mendelssohn and Mozart, made her Wiener Staatsoper debut in the role of Susanna (Le nozze di Figaro), and toured with Wiener Staatsoper to Japan with the same role under Muti in the classical production by Jean-Pierre Ponnelle.

Feola appeared in the 2017 New Year's Concert of La Fenice singing music by Bellini, Donizetti, and Verdi under Fabio Luisi. The concert was broadcast by RAI and streamed by ARTE worldwide. She made her Teatro alla Scala debut in 2017 as well, in her role debut of Ninetta for the occasion of the 200th anniversary of the premiere of La gazza ladra at La Scala (1817) under Riccardo Chailly. The performance was broadcast by RAI Radio and TV and was shown in cinemas worldwide as part of the "All'Opera" 16/17 Season.

On 21 June 2020, Feola joined Riccardo Muti and Orchestra Giovanile Luigi Cherubini for a concert inaugurating Ravenna Festival of the year, singing music of Mozart. The open-air concert taking place at Rocca Brancaleone, with all regulations of social distancing, was one of the first live concerts in Italy after almost four months of lockdown due to COVID-19 pandemic. The performance was live broadcast by RAI Radio 3 (audio) and streamed online (video).

On 16 October 2020, Feola made her anticipated role debut of Violetta (La traviata) at Teatro Gabriello Chiabrera in Savona. The production was created by Renata Scotto who made her career debut exactly in the same role at this theater in 1952.

In 2023, Feola appeared in the movie Maestro singing with Isabel Leonard in the finale of Gustav Mahler's Symphony No. 2 in C minor "Resurrection", in a reproduction of the famed 1973 performance led by Leonard Bernstein in Ely Cathedral.

Other roles Feola has sung include Serafina (Il campanello), Zerlina (Don Giovanni), Servilia (La clemenza di Tito), Musetta (La bohème), Lauretta (Gianni Schicchi), Carolina (Il matrimonio segreto), Norina (Don Pasquale), Sandrina (La finta giardiniera), Ilia (Idomeneo), Leïla (Les pêcheurs de perles), Amina (La sonnambula), Lucia (Lucia di Lammermoor), Dircé (Médée), Fiorilla (Il turco in Italia).

== Personal life ==
On 9 December 2015, Feola married baritone Sergio Vitale, who is also from Caserta. Rosa Feola has two younger brothers: Carlo, a bass-baritone, and Gianluca, a violinist.
