= Claudio Desderi =

Italian baritone and conductor (1943–2018)

Claudio Desdèri (9 April 1943 – 30 June 2018) was an Italian baritone and conductor.

== Life ==
Born in Alessandria, son of Ettore Desderi, he made his debut in 1969 as Gaudenzio in Rossini's Il signor Bruschino in Edinburgh. A versatile baritone, he preferred comic roles.

He was artistic director of the Pisa Teatro Verdi from 1991 to 1998, of the Turin Teatro Regio from 1999 to 2001 and superintendent of the Palermo Teatro Massimo from 2002 to 2003, the latter of which he brought to economic and cultural revival.

In addition to his activities as singer and director of opera companies, from the early 1990s he also worked as a conductor.

Desdèri died in Florence at age 75.

== Discography ==
- Bussotti: The Rara Requiem - Carol Plantamura/Claudio Desderi/Delia Surrat/Gianpiero Taverna/Giuseppe Baratti/Giuseppe Sinopoli/NDR Sinfonieorchester/Saarbrücken Rundfunk Symphony Orchestra, 2007 Deutsche Grammophon
- Rossini: Il Signor Bruschino - Alessandro Codeluppi/Claudio Desderi/I Virtuosi Italiani/Massimiliano Barbolini, 2004 Naxos
- Rossini: La pietra del paragone - Claudio Desderi/Alessandro Svab/Paolo Rumetz/Maria Costanza Nocentini/Paolo Barbacini/Coro Lirico Amadeus Teatro Comunale di Modena/Helga Müller-Molinari/Roberto Scaltriti/Vincenzo di Matteo/Antonella Trovarelli/Orchestra Camerata Musicale, 2008 Nuova Era

== Videography ==
- Donizetti: Don Pasquale (Ravenna Festival 2006) - Claudio Desderi/Mario Cassi/Juan Francisco Gatell/Riccardo Muti/Andrea De Rosa, Arthaus Musik/Naxos
- Mozart: Così fan tutte (La Scala, 1989) - Daniela Dessì/Alessandro Corbelli/Claudio Desderi/Riccardo Muti, Opus Arte/Naxos
- Mozart: Don Giovanni (La Scala, 1987) - Thomas Allen/Edita Gruberová/Natale De Carolis/Riccardo Muti, Opus Arte/Naxos
- Rossini, La Cenerentola - Abbado/Stade/Araiza/Desderi, directed by Jean-Pierre Ponnelle, 2005 Deutsche Grammophon
