= Salzburg Whitsun Festival =

Classical music and opera festival founded 1973

Salzburg Whitsun Festival Pfingstfestspiele Salzburg
- Genre: Classical music; Opera
- Date: Pentecost weekend (moveable)
- Frequency: Annual
- Venue: Salzburg Grand Festival Theatre; Haus für Mozart; Felsenreitschule; Mozarteum
- Locations: Salzburg, Austria
- Inaugurated: 1973; 53 years ago
- Founder: Herbert von Karajan
- Leader: Cecilia Bartoli, Artistic Director
- Organiser: Salzburg Festival
- Website: salzburgerfestspiele.at/en/whitsunfestival

The Salzburg Whitsun Festival (German: Pfingstfestspiele Salzburg) (Note: At times branded as Whitsun+Baroque (Pfingten+Barock) or Salzburg Festival Whitsun (Salzburger Festspiele Pfingsten).) is a classical music and opera festival held every year in Salzburg, Austria over Pentecost (Whitsun) weekend in late May or early June.

It was created in 1973 by the conductor Herbert von Karajan, and until the 1997 edition called the Salzburg Whitsun Concerts (Pfingstkonzerte Salzburg). The short concert series initially served as a complement to the Salzburg Easter Festival, founded in 1967 by Karajan with the Berlin Philharmonic.

In 1998, production was transferred to the organisation which puts out the (summertime) Salzburg Festival, and augmented with an opera performance, with a focus on the baroque and classical periods. Since 2012, its artistic director has been the Italian mezzo-soprano Cecilia Bartoli. Les Musiciens du Prince, the pit orchestra of the opéra de Monte-Carlo of which Bartoli is also artistic director, is in residence at the festival.

Performances usually take place at the adjoining venues of the summer festival, the Salzburg Great Festival Theatre, the smaller Haus für Mozart and the open-air Felsenreitschule, as well as at the Mozarteum.

== History ==
The founder of the Salzburg Festival in 1920, Hugo von Hofmannsthal, envisioned extending it, with editions “every year in the summer, but also now and then at other times, such as around Christmas, or elsewhen in the winter, also at Easter and Pentecost”.

=== Karajan years ===
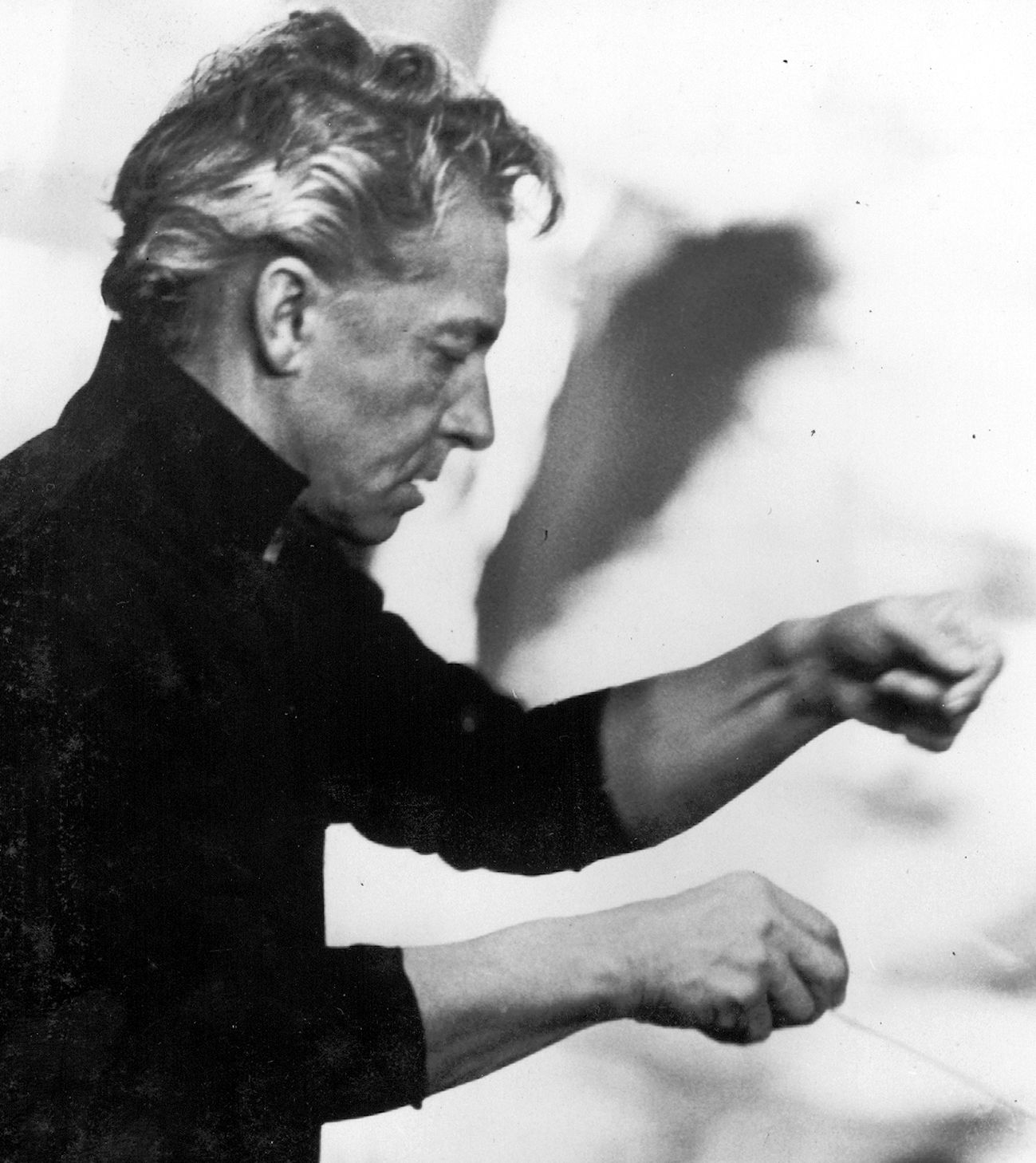
Herbert von Karajan conducting in the early 1970s.

The festival was founded in 1973, as the Salzburg Whitsun Concerts, by the conductor Herbert von Karajan. A Salzburg native and nearby resident, Karajan was in charge of the summer festival since 1957, and in 1967 had created a separate Salzburg Easter Festival in order to produce opera with complete artistic and managerial independence, bringing the Berlin Philharmonic, of which he was chief conductor. Due to the high demand for the relatively short Easter festival, the Whitsun concerts were created for repeat or complementary concerts by Karajan and the Berlin Philharmonic, intended for those who could not obtain tickets for Easter. The concerts took place at the Salzburg Grand Festival Theatre, built at Karajan’s request and opened in 1960.

Karajan and the orchestra usually performed three symphony or choral concerts featuring great works of the romantic era, with an initial focus on the works of Anton Bruckner, paralleling those on Richard Wagner at Easter and Wolfgang Amadeus Mozart and Richard Strauss in the summer. Anne-Sophie Mutter, Karajan’s favourite violinist in his last decade, first performed with him at the age of 13 at the 1977 edition, playing Beethoven’s Violin Concerto.

Starting in 1983, Karajan, due to his degrading relation with the Berlin Philharmonic as well as to his declining state of health, invited a number of guest conductors, such as Lorin Maazel, Seiji Ozawa, Vladimir Ashkenazy and James Levine, and for a time brought the Vienna Philharmonic for his own concerts.

Following his resignation as chief conductor of the Berlin Philharmonic in April 1989, Karajan initially planned to invite the Vienna Philharmonic at Whitsun the next year, sharing conducting duties with Georges Prêtre; however, he died in July 1989.

=== 1990s transition ===
The Whitsun Concerts continued after Karajan’s death. The Berlin Philharmonic returned to the Easter Festival in 1991 after a one-year absence, but not at Whitsun, for which other international orchestras were invited. Georg Solti, who served as artistic director at Easter in 1992–1993, also took over the Whitsun Concerts until 1994 with the Chicago Symphony Orchestra, of which he had been music director, sharing conducting duties with his successor Daniel Barenboim. The new chief conductor in Berlin, Claudio Abbado, also became artistic director at Easter in 1994, restoring the close association of the Karajan years between orchestra and festival, but they did not came back for Whitsun. Although the London Symphony Orchestra was in residence for the next three years, the event found itself with little of an artistic line.

In 1998, the management passed to the Salzburg Festspielfonds, the organisation with puts out the summer festival, with Hans Landesmann, who was in charge of concert programming in the summer, as artistic director. Now called a Whitsun Festival and branded as Whitsun+Baroque, it was expanded to opera with a complement of concerts, with a focus on baroque music, which is not traditionally played at the summer festival but had gained new interest from mainstream musical institutions following the historically informed performance movement. One inspiration was the International Baroque Days held for Whitsun at Melk Abbey. The first opera production was Francesco Cavalli’s La Calisto (1651).

That same year, the newly-opened Festspielhaus Baden-Baden, Germany’s largest opera house, created a Herbert von Karajan Whitsun Festival, with Salzburg’s agreement.

The event relied on prominent guest conductors, orchestras and singers. As is common for a number of opera festivals, especially those which only give a reduced number of performances like the Easter Festival, the Whitsun Festival usually works in co-production, often with the summer festival.

=== Riccardo Muti ===
Starting in 2007, Jürgen Flimm, the new intendant of the summer festival, decided to entrust the artistic direction of each Whitsun Festival to an artist with a thematic carte blanche. The American baritone Thomas Hampson initially accepted to take over the 2007 edition, but withdrew a few months later due to other commitments.

The first artistic director under the new system was the Italian conductor Riccardo Muti, a frequent guest at the summer festival. His project, initially for three years but extended to five, was a partnership with the Ravenna Festival, founded by his wife, to rediscover and revive the legacy of the 18th-century Neapolitan School, under the motto “Naples: A City in Retrospect”. The Luigi Cherubini Youth Orchestra (Italian: Orchestra Giovanile Luigi Cherubini), a youth orchestra he had founded in Piacenza with a summer residence in Ravenna, also took residence in Salzburg. The debut production in 2007 was Domenico Cimarosa’s Il ritorno di Don Calandrino, which had not been performed for two centuries.

Opera productions:

- 2007: Il ritorno di Don Calandrino (1778), by Domenico Cimarosa
- 2008: Il matrimonio inaspettato (1779), by Giovanni Paisiello
- 2009: Demofoonte (1743), by Niccolò Jommelli
- 2010: Betulia liberata (1771), by Wolfgang Amadeus Mozart
- 2011: I due Figaro (1826), by Saverio Mercadante

=== Cecilia Bartoli ===
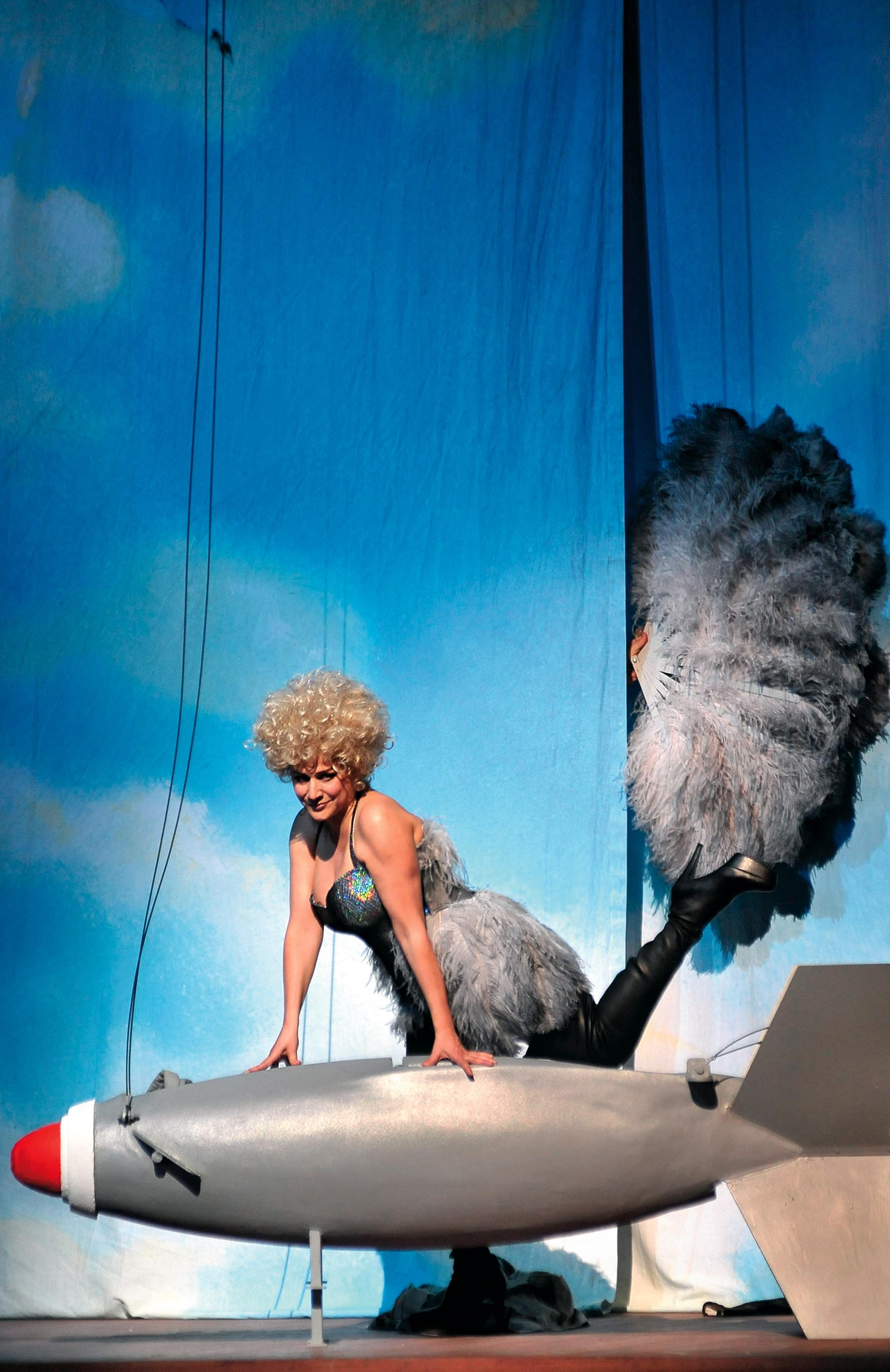
Cecilia Bartoli starring as Cleopatra in her 2012 debut production Giulio Cesare, staged by Moshe Leiser and Patrice Caurier (summer revival)

In 2012, the Italian mezzo-soprano Cecilia Bartoli became artistic director of the festival, where she had given one of her first professional performances in 1987, invited by Karajan for Bach’s Mass in B minor. It was announced that the opera produced each year for Whitsun, with two performances, would then be revived at the summer festival a few weeks later.

Bartoli chose women as her broad spotlight, each year presenting “a new facet of femininity”, which she would embody herself as the female lead. Although each edition has a particular theme, her overall direction displayed a less academic approach than her predecessors’, as her star appeal became the festival’s centre of interest, echoing that of Karajan in its founding years and returning to what she called “the old recipe of organizing beautiful programs and inviting great artists”. The operas put in production have been from her core personal repertoire ranging from baroque to bel canto, with several works of George Frideric Handel and Gioachino Rossini. She even chose the musical West Side Story in 2016 in order to sing Maria, drawing public reservations from the summer festival president Helga Rabl-Stadler over the vocal suitability of the cast as well as the use of a sound system.

Despite the initial plans for short-term artistic directions, Bartoli’s was renewed for several years, with her contract eventually running until 2031. Les Musiciens du Prince, a baroque orchestra formed in 2016 at the opéra de Monte-Carlo with Bartoli as artistic director, became resident orchestra in Salzburg in 2017; Bartoli became director of the opera in January 2023.

The 2020 edition, with Gaetano Donizetti’s Don Pasquale, was cancelled due to the COVID-19 pandemic in Austria. The festival returned in 2021, at half capacity that year.

Editions under Bartoli’s direction
Year	Theme	Main opera
2012	“Cleopatra”	Giulio Cesare (1724), by George Frideric Handel
2013	“Sacrifice – Opfer – Victim”	Norma (1831), by Vincenzo Bellini
2014	“Rossinissimo”	La Cenerentola (1817), by Gioachino Rossini
2015	“Thus do I call upon all the gods”	Iphigénie en Tauride (1779), by Christoph Willibald Gluck
2016	“Romeo and Juliet”	West Side Story (1957), by Leonard Bernstein
2017	“Joy of Grief”	Ariodante (1735), by George Frideric Handel
2018	“1868 – Year of Ruptures”	L'italiana in Algeri (1813), by Gioachino Rossini
2019	“Voci celesti – Heavenly Voices”	Alcina (1735), by George Frideric Handel
2020 (cancelled)	“La couleur du temps – The Colour of Time”	Don Pasquale (1843), by Gaetano Donizetti
2021	“ROMA ÆTERNA”	Il trionfo del Tempo e del Disinganno (1707), by George Frideric Handel
2022	“Sevilla”	The Barber of Seville (1816), by Gioachino Rossini
2023	“Les Passions de l’âme”	Orfeo ed Euridice (1762), by Christoph Willibald Gluck
2024	“Tutto Mozart”	La clemenza di Tito (1791), by Wolfgang Amadeus Mozart
2025	“Sounds of the Serenissima”	Hotel Metamorphosis, a pasticcio from Ovid’s Metamorphoses set to music by Antonio Vivaldi, arranged by Barrie Kosky (stage direction) and Olaf A. Schmitt (dramaturgy)
2026	“Bon voyage !”	Il viaggio a Reims (1825), by Gioachino Rossini

== Governance and funding ==
Since 1998, the Salzburg Whitsun Festival has been organised by the Salzburger Festspielfonds, the public law foundation of the Austrian state which also puts out the summer festival, although not the Easter festival.

As of 2010, the Whitsun Festival had a budget of €735,000, of which €360,000 came from ticket sale; it had 6,100 visitors that year, with a 79% occupancy rate.

=== Artistic directors ===
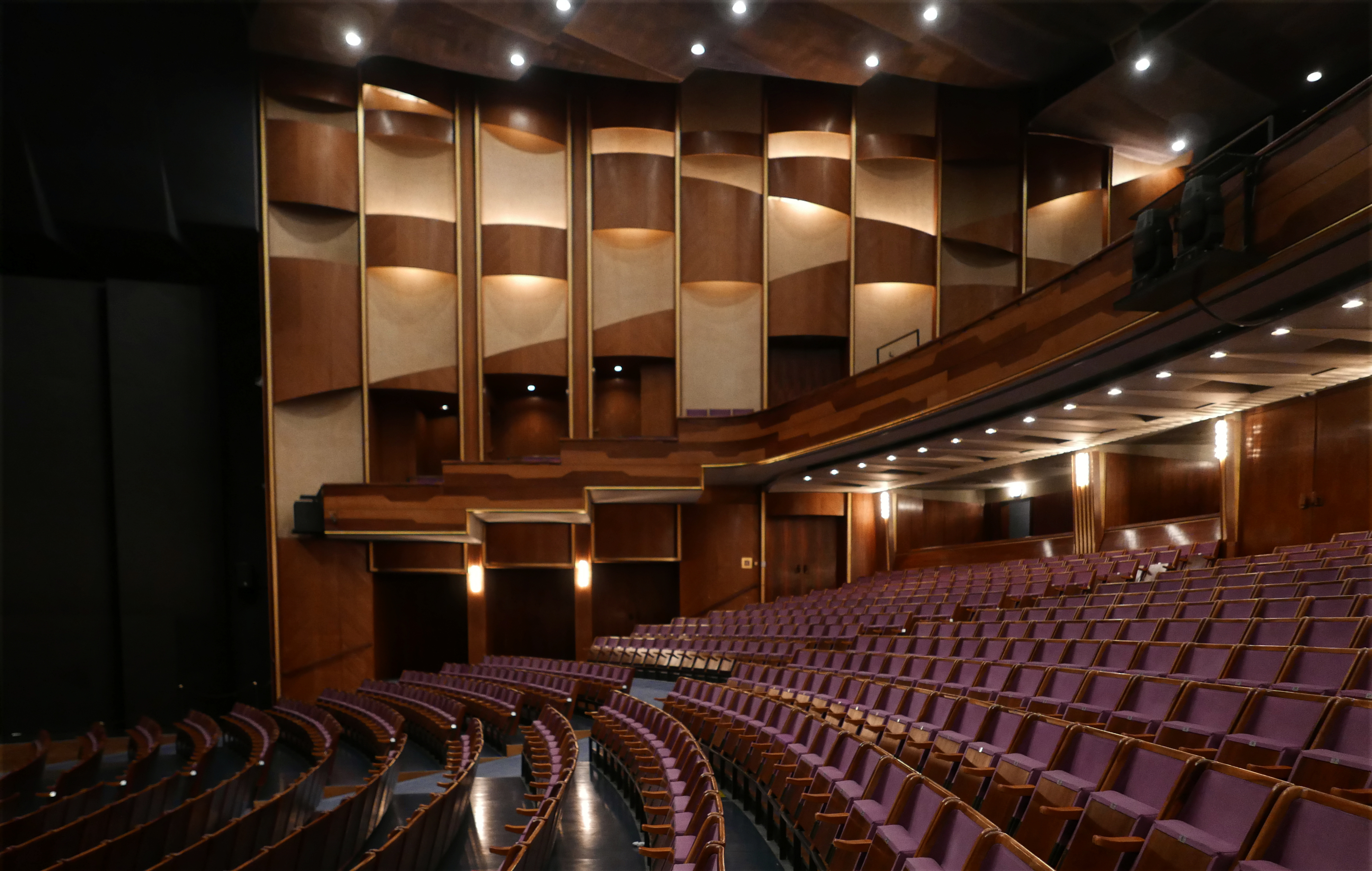
The auditorium of the Salzburg Grand Festival Theatre.

- 1973–1988: Herbert von Karajan, also artistic director of the Easter Festival, chief conductor of the Berlin Philharmonic
- 1992–1994: Georg Solti, also artistic director of the Easter Festival (1992–1993), music director laureate of the Chicago Symphony Orchestra
- 1998–2001: Hans Landesmann, as concert director of the summer festival
- 2007–2011: Riccardo Muti
- 2012–present (until 2031): Cecilia Bartoli

== Media ==
From Riccardo Muti’s direction, Il ritorno di Don Calandrino and I due Figaro were released on CD, as was a talk by Muti about Calandrino with piano accompaniment on DVD.

From Cecilia Bartoli’s direction, Giulio Cesare, Ariodante, and L'italiana in Algeri were released on DVD.

== See also ==
- List of opera festivals
- List of classical music festivals
- Early music festivals

== Sources ==
- Kleinert, Annemarie (2009) [German ed. 2005]. Music at Its Best: The Berlin Philharmonic. From Karajan to Rattle (PDF). Translated by Mitchell, Allan; Kleinert, Annemarie (updated ed.). Norderstedt: Books on Demand. pp. 106–126. ISBN 978-3-83706-361-5.
