= Laura Giordano =

Italian lyric soprano (born 1979)

- Born: 9 June 1979 (age 47); Palermo, Italy
- Occupation: Opera singer (soprano)
- Years active: 1995–present
- Website: www.lauragiordano.com

Laura Giordano (born 9 June 1979) is an Italian lyric soprano.

== Life and career ==
Born in Palermo, Laura Giordano made her operatic debut at a very young age in Noye's Fludde by Britten. She went on to sing in numerous opera houses and festivals in Europe, Asia and North and South America, including Teatro alla Scala, the Salzburg Festival, Opéra National de Paris, the Rossini Opera Festival in Pesaro, and the Santa Fe Opera in New Mexico.

The core of Giordano's repertory is formed by roles in the operas of Donizetti, Verdi, Mozart and Puccini. Her Donizetti roles include Norina (Don Pasquale) performed with Riccardo Muti at the Ravenna Festival, at Théâtre des Champs-Elysées in Paris, in Liège, Cologne, Como, Moscow and Saint Petersburg, and in further performances in Santiago de Chile, Treviso, at Teatro Massimo Bellini in Catania, and in Ferrara; Adina (L'elisir d'amore) in Las Palmas, Tel Aviv, Maribor and Oderzo; Marie (La fille du régiment) at Teatro Massimo in Palermo, in Lecce, and on a tour with Teatro Comunale di Bologna at the Savonlinna Opera Festival; and Betly (Betly) at Konzerthaus in Berlin.

Her performances in Verdi's operas include Falstaff (Nannetta) in Milan conducted by Riccardo Muti, and in Strasbourg, Rome, Brussels, Lyon, at the Santa Fe Opera, at Teatro Regio di Torino, and at Berwaldhallen in Stockholm; Rigoletto (Gilda) at Seoul Arts Center, and in Fano and Ancona; Un ballo in maschera (Oscar) conducted by Antonio Pappano at Accademia Nazionale di Santa Cecilia, under the baton of Valery Gergiev at Teatro Regio di Parma, and in Nice and Trieste; and Don Carlo (Tebaldo) conducted by Zubin Mehta at Maggio Musicale Fiorentino.

Amongst her Mozart roles are Pamina (Die Zauberflöte) in Palermo; Donna Anna (Don Giovanni) in Palermo, in Fano, and at Piccolo Festival FVG; Susanna (Le nozze di Figaro) at Teatro Regio di Parma, Semperoper in Dresden Teatro Carlo Felice in Genoa, and in Reggio Emilia; Zerlina (Don Giovanni) at Opernhaus Zürich; Despina (Così fan tutte) in Palermo, Catania and Zürich; and Barbarina (Le nozze di Figaro) at Opéra Bastille in Paris.

She sang Musetta in Puccini's La bohème multiple times, including performances at Teatro alla Scala, Teatro Real in Madrid, in Catania, and at Opéra Royal de Wallonie. She has also sung Lauretta in Puccini's Gianni Schicchi in a performance in Lisbon.

Giordano's first Bellini role was Elvira in I puritani at Teatro Massimo Bellini in Catania.

Her other significant roles, several of them in rarely performed operas, have been: Livietta (Il ritorno di Don Calandrino) conducted by Riccardo Muti at the Salzburg Festival, in Ravenna, in Las Palmas in Pisa, and in Piacenza; Corinna (Il viaggio a Reims) in Pesaro, at Teatro Real de Madrid and at the Rossini in Wildbad opera festival; Coraline (Le toréador) in Palermo; Carolina (Il matrimonio segreto) at Théâtre des Champs-Elysées in Paris, the Barbican Centre in London, and in Palermo; Donna Fulvia (La pietra del paragone) at Théâtre du Châtelet in Paris; Elena (Il cappello di paglia di Firenze) at Maggio Musicale Fiorentino; Sylvie (La colombe) at the Accademia Musicale Chigiana; Vi (Blue Monday) at the Teatro Nacional de São Carlos in Lisbon; and Aminta (L'Olimpiade) at Festival de Beaune.

Giordano has performed as a soloist in Mozart's Requiem at St. John in the Lateran; Rossini's Stabat Mater in Palermo; Poulenc's Stabat Mater in Palermo; Schubert's Mass No. 6 at Festival de Saint-Denis; Mozart's Krönungsmesse at the Mozart Festival in La Coruña; Mahler's Symphony No. 4 in Kazan; and Orff's Carmina Burana at Teatro Fraschini in Pavia, in Ravenna, and at the Baths of Caracalla in Rome.

In 2010 Giordano appeared as a guest artist in Roberto Alagna's concert at Arènes de Bayonne dedicated to Luis Mariano. In 2014 she took part in the TV show Il meglio d'Italia hosted on Rai 1 by Enrico Brignano, performing excerpts from Rigoletto and La traviata, and also made an appearance in the show Si può fare! as a vocal coach of Karin Proia. Moreover, the same year Giordano made her debut as an actress in her first movie, Laurus Nobilis.

== Discography ==
=== DVD ===
- La bohème, Giacomo Puccini. Opus Arte, OA 0961, 2006
- La pietra del paragone, Gioachino Rossini. Naive, V5089, 2007
- Don Pasquale, Gaetano Donizetti. Arthaus Musik, 101303, 2007
- Riccardo Muti - Lezioni concerto, 5. La lezione: Muti incontra Cimarosa. Gruppo Editoriale L'Espresso S.p.A., 2009
- Roberto Alagna Live. Deutsche Grammophon, LC00173 - 0762797 - EDV17, 2010

=== CD ===
- Rossini Discoveries, Gioachino Rossini. Decca, 4702982, 2002
- L'Olimpiade, Antonio Vivaldi. Opus 111, OP30316, 2003
- Don Pasquale, Gaetano Donizetti. RAI Trade, RTTI 0002, 2008
- Il ritorno di Don Calandrino, Domenico Cimarosa. Gruppo Editoriale L'Espresso S.p.A., 2009
