= I due Figaro (Mercadante) =

1835 opera by Saverio Mercadante

Saverio Mercadante

I due Figaro, o sia Il soggetto di una commedia is an opera (melodramma buffo) in two acts by Saverio Mercadante to a libretto by Felice Romani based on Les deux Figaro by Honoré-Antoine Richaud Martelly. The opera was composed in 1826 but its production was delayed for some years due to censors' intervention.

I due Figaro premiered on 26 January 1835 at the Teatro del Príncipe in Madrid.

The manuscript of I due Figaro was discovered in 2009 in Madrid by an Italian musicologist. Two years later, in June 2011, the first production of the opera in modern times was presented at the Salzburg Whitsun Festival and the Ravenna Festival, conducted by Riccardo Muti. Amore Opera staged the US premiere at the Connelly Theater in New York City on 18 October 2011, conducted by Gregory Buchalter.

The music of this opera, enriched by several dances of Spanish sonority but hampered by a libretto at times weak, was judged "lightweight and brilliant, gracefully written, often refined in the effects of the counterpoint, in the intertwining of the internal voices, in the quality of instrumentation and rhythmic inventiveness". The opera is introduced by the Sinfonia caratteristica spagnola, a lively ouverture based on typical Spanish dances, that obtained a good success and was also printed as a separate piece.

== Roles ==
Roles, voice types
Role	Voice type
Count Almaviva	tenor
Countess Rosina	mezzo-soprano
Inez, her daughter	soprano
Cherubino, under the name of Figaro	contralto
Figaro, servant of the Count	bass
Susanna, wife of Figaro and housemaid of the Countess	soprano
Torribio, under the name of Don Alvaro	tenor
Plagio, young playwright	bass
A Notary	
Men and women vassals of the Count. Servants

== Synopsis ==
Place: The castle of Count Almaviva, one mile away from Seville.

=== Act 1 ===
Torribio wants to marry Inez, the daughter of Count Almaviva. To reach his goal, he has devised a plan, with the help of Figaro, to whom Torribio will give a part of the rich dowry. Almaviva, deceived by false letters that present Torribio as Don Alvaro, agrees to the marriage.

But Inez is in love with Cherubino and tries, with the help of the Countess Rosina and Susanna, to avoid the undesired union. Cherubino, disguised as another Figaro, gains Almaviva's trust and becomes his servant.

The other Figaro, suspicious, tells Almaviva that Cherubino is the lover of Inez, in order to put him in bad light. When Almaviva and Figaro lurk to catch Cherubino and Inez together, they discover Cherubino in company of Susanna. Cherubino, supported by Susanna, claims to be in love with her and Figaro, furious, is forced by the insistence of all the characters rushed to the scene to show forgiveness.

The events are peppered with the interventions of Plagio, a playwright in search of a subject for a new comedy.

=== Act 2 ===
Cherubino and Inez meet in the room of Susanna. They want to find a way to avoid the marriage with Don Alvaro, expected for the same evening. Suddenly Figaro appears, convinced that Susanna is plotting against him with the help of Cherubino.

When also Almaviva and the Countess appear, Figaro discovers Cherubino and Inez hidden in a wardrobe. Almaviva decides to chase away Cherubino and Susanna, but Susanna manages to obtain his forgiveness.

Torribio arrives for the wedding, but Cherubino, come back in the castle, recognizes in the supposed Don Alvaro a former servant of his. Therefore Cherubino decides to reveal his true identity and discloses to Almaviva that Figaro and Torribio were trying to deceive him. To Almaviva remains nothing else to do that agreeing to the marriage between Inez and Cherubino and, on the insistence of Susanna, he forgives also Figaro.

== Recordings ==
2011: Riccardo Muti, Orchestra Giovanile Luigi Cherubini; Philharmonia Chor Wien,
(Live recording at Teatro Comunale Alighieri in Ravenna, 24 and 26 June); CD: Ducale DUC 045-47

Count Almaviva: Antonio Poli
Countess Rosina: Asude Karayavuz
Inez: Rosa Feola
Cherubino: Annalisa Stroppa

Figaro: Mario Cassi
Susanna: Eleonora Buratto
Torribio: Anicio Zorzi Giustiniani
Plagio: Omar Montanari
