= Eleonora Buratto =

Italian operatic soprano (born 1982)

- Born: 1982 (age 43–44); Mantua, Italy
- Genre: Opera
- Occupation: Soprano
- Years active: 2007–present
- Website: eleonoraburatto.com

Eleonora Buratto (born 1982) is an Italian soprano opera singer. She is a graduate of the Conservatorio Lucio Campiani, the conservatory of Mantua, the city of her birth.

== Reception ==
Eduardo Benarroch found her to show "more than promise" as Nanetta in Verdi's Falstaff with Zubin Mehta conducting in Salzburg in July 2013.

Her 2016 Metropolitan Opera debut as Norina in Donizetti's Don Pasquale was well received.

== Discography ==
- I due Figaro, Saverio Mercadante. Riccardo Muti, Philharmonia Chor Wien, Orchestra Giovanile Luigi Cherubini. 2012
- Ariadne auf Naxos, Richard Strauss. Daniel Harding, Vienna Philharmonic. DVD, 2012
- Falstaff, Giuseppe Verdi. Zubin Mehta, Vienna Philharmonic. DVD 2013.
- Indomita (2025), Eleonora Buratto – Bellini. Donizetti, Verdi
- Marina, Umberto Giordano. Vincenzo Milletari, Orchestra i Pomeriggi Musicali, Milan. Freddie de Tomasso, Mihai Damian, Nicholas Mogg. Decca, 2026.
