= Il ritorno di Don Calandrino =

- Intermezzo by Domenico Cimarosa
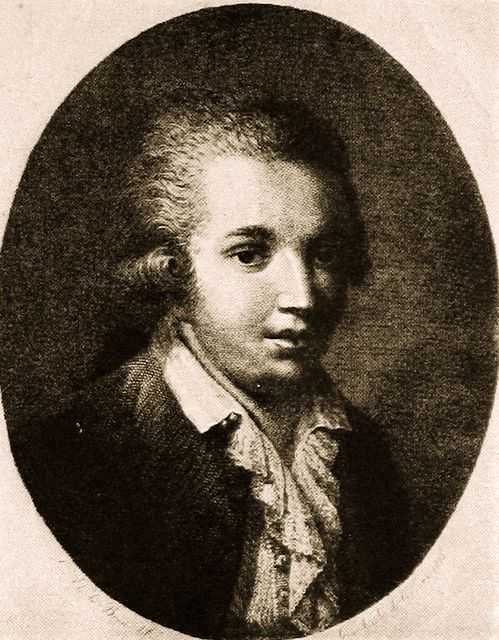
- Composer Domenico Cimarosa
- Translation: The Return of Don Calandrino
- Other title: Armidoro e Laurina
- Librettist: Giuseppe Petrosellini (?)
- Language: Italian
- Premiere: 1778; Teatro Valle, Rome

Il ritorno di Don Calandrino (The Return of Don Calandrino), also known as Armidoro e Laurina, is an intermezzo in two acts by Domenico Cimarosa with an Italian libretto presumably written by Giuseppe Petrosellini.

== Performance history ==
The premiere took place in 1778 at Teatro Valle in Rome. Performances in Livorno (1783), Prague (1785), Vienna (1787), Barcelona (1788), Florence (1788 and 1793) and Padua (1801) followed. After a long break, the opera was revived in 2007, under the musical direction of Riccardo Muti in a series of performances at the Salzburg Whitsun Festival, Teatro Pérez Galdós in Las Palmas, Teatro Municipale in Piacenza, Teatro Verdi in Pisa, and the Ravenna Festival.

== Roles ==
Role	Voice type
Livietta	soprano castrato travesti
Don Calandrino	soprano castrato
Monsieur Le Blonde	bass
Irene	soprano castrato travesti
Valerio	tenor

== Synopsis ==
The libretto gives a humorous account of characters and actions of Don Calandrino, the son of the podestà of Monte Secco (Abruzzo, Italy), who pretends he knows everything, but in fact is incapable of even thinking logically; Livietta, a haughty and rich peasant girl, who tries to act as a lady, but invariably fails both in her language and manners; Monsieur Le Blonde, a French traveler eager to talk about places he has supposedly visited, but of which he knows nothing; Irene, a simple and humble girl; and Valerio, the Mayor of Monte Secco and Irene’s brother. After several turns, the story resolves in pairing Don Calandrino with Livietta, and Le Blonde with Irene.

== Recordings ==
Year	Cast (Livietta, Don Calandrino, Monsieur Le Blonde, Irene, Valerio)	Conductor, Orchestra	Label
2009	Laura Giordano, Juan Francisco Gatell, Marco Vinco, Monica Tarone, Francesco Marsiglia	Riccardo Muti; Orchestra Giovanile Luigi Cherubini	CD: Gruppo Editoriale L'Espresso
