= Il re Teodoro in Venezia =

Il re Teodoro in Venezia is a 1784 comic opera by Giovanni Paisiello to a libretto Giovanni Battista Casti. Premiered at the Burgtheater Vienna, it was revived for Carnival in Parma in 1788.

== Recordings ==
- 1962: Cecilia Fusco, Rukmini Sukmawati, Nicola Monti, Sesto Bruscantini, Angelo Nosotti, I Virtuosi di Roma, conductor: Renato Fasano; Andromeda
- 1998: Teodoro – André Cognet, Gafforio – Stuart Kale, Belisa Emanuela Barazia, Taddeo Fabio Previati. La Fenice, conductor Isaac Karabtchevsky; Mondo Musica
