= La grotta di Trofonio =

Opera by Antonio Salieri

- Opera by Antonio Salieri
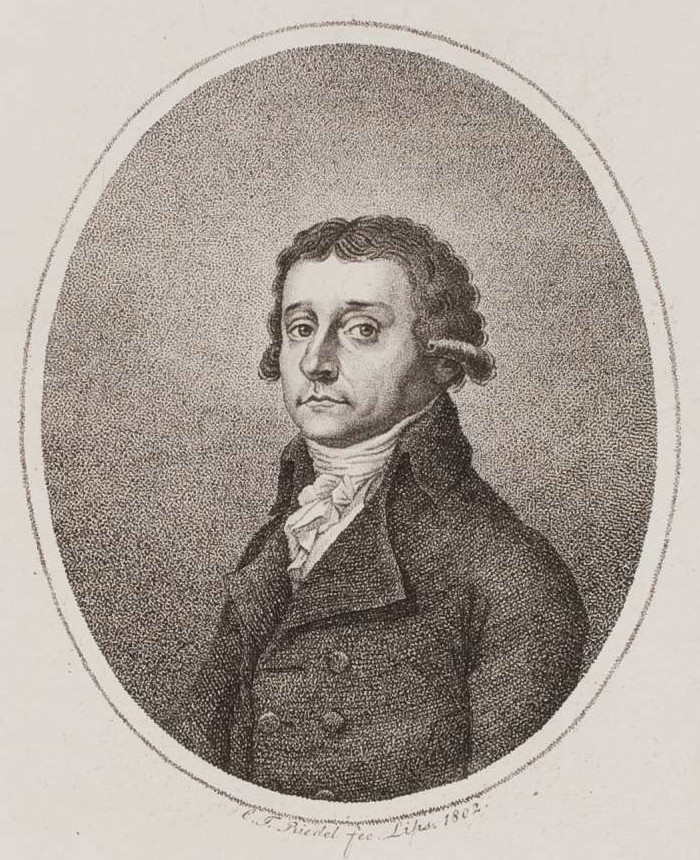
- Antonio Salieri, engraving by Carl Traugott Riedel, 1802
- Translation: Trofonio's Cave
- Librettist: Giovanni Battista Casti
- Language: Italian
- Premiere: 12 October 1785; Burgtheater, Vienna

La grotta di Trofonio (Trofonio's Cave) is an opera, described as an opera comica, in two acts (five scenes) composed by Antonio Salieri to an Italian libretto by Giovanni Battista Casti.

The work was first performed in Vienna at the Burgtheater on 12 October 1785. The similarity of the story of the opera may have influenced Lorenzo da Ponte when he wrote the libretto of Mozart's Così fan tutte.

== Roles ==
Role	Voice type	Premiere cast 12 October 1785	Revival 14 March 2005
Aristone	bass	Francesco Bussani	Olivier Lallouette
Dori, daughter of Aristone, in love with Plistene	soprano	Celeste Coltellini	Marie Arnet
Ofelia, daughter of Aristone, in love with Artemidoro	soprano	Nancy Storace	Raffaella Milanesi
Artemidoro	tenor	Vincenzo Calvesi	Nikolai Schukoff
Plistene	tenor Stefano Mandini	Mario Cassi	
Trofonio, a magician	bass	Francesco Benucci	Carlo Lepore

== Synopsis ==
Dori and Ofelia (sisters) are in love with Plistene and Artemidoro (friends). The two pairs have contrasting personalities: Dori and Plistene are extroverted and enthusiastic, Ofelia and Artemidoro are introverted and reserved. The magician Trofonio invites them to his magic cave where their characters are reversed, first the men and then the women. Eventually everything is sorted out and there is a happy ending.

== Recordings ==
Les Talens Lyriques and Lausanne Opera Chorus

- Conductor: Christophe Rousset
- Principal singers: Olivier Lallouette, Raffaella Milanesi, Marie Arnet, Nikolai Schukoff, Mario Cassi
- Recording date: (published 2005)
- Label: Ambroisie AMB 9986

== Literature ==
- Rice, John A (1992), 'Grotta di Trofonio, La' in The New Grove Dictionary of Opera, ed. Stanley Sadie (London) ISBN 0-333-73432-7
