= Mario Cassi =

Italian singer

Mario Cassi (born 6 December 1973) is an Italian baritone.

== Career ==
Born in Arezzo, graduated in economics at University of Florence, Cassi studied singing privately first with Slavska Taskova Paoletti, then with Alessandra Rossi and Bruno de Simone, and won in 2002 the "Viotti of Vercelli" (second prize) and the "Toti Dal Monte" competitions in Treviso (special prize Cesare Bardelli), after which he made his debut in Gioacchino Rossini's La Cenerentola. In 2003 he won the "Operalia" of Plácido Domingo and in 2004 the "Spiros Argiris" competitions.

He was chosen by Riccardo Muti for the role of Doctor Malatesta in Don Pasquale at the Ravenna Festival, the Musikverein in Vienna, Moscow, St. Petersburg, Liège, Cologne and Paris.

After making his debut at the Opéra Royal de Wallonie in the role of Figaro in Rossini's The Barber of Seville, he plays this role in well-known international theatres such as: Verona Arena, Teatro Real in Madrid, Palau de les Arts Reina Sofia in Valencia, Gran Teatre del Liceu, Teatro Colón in Buenos Aires, Opera of Firenze, Baths of Caracalla, Teatro di San Carlo of Naples, Teatro Verdi of Trieste, Opéra de Monte-Carlo, Rossini Opera Festival.

In 2017 he is still Malatesta in Don Pasquale in Düsseldorf directed by Rolando Villazón; in 2018 he is the protagonist of Don Giovanni (role held also in 2016 in Liège) in Cologne.

In recent years he has expanded his repertoire towards romantic bel canto, with Riccardo in Bellini's I Puritani, Enrico in Lucia di Lammermoor, the Count of Vergy in Gemma di Vergy and filming Donizetti's La Favorite, among others. Above all, however, he made his debut in important Verdi characters such as Giorgio Germont (Liège, 2016) and the Count of Luna (Liège, 2018).

== Discography ==
=== CD ===
- 2002 - Gioacchino Rossini, La scala di seta, dir. Giovan Battista Varoli, Bongiovanni
- 2005 - Antonio Salieri, La grotta di Trofonio, dir. Christophe Rousset, Naïve/Ambroise
- 2005 - Filippo Marchetti, Romeo e Giulietta, dir. Andriy Yurkevych, Dynamic
- 2007 - Boieldieu, Le calife de Bagdad, dir. Christophe Rousset, Archiv
- 2012 - Saverio Mercadante, I due Figaro dir. Riccardo Muti, Ducalemusic

=== DVD ===
- 2006 - Gaetano Donizetti, Don Pasquale, dir. Riccardo Muti, regie Andrea De Rosa, Ravenna, RaiTrade-Arthaus
- 2007 - Gaetano Donizetti, Maria Stuarda, dir. Riccardo Frizza, regie Pierluigi Pizzi, Macerata, Naxos
- 2009 - Domenico Cimarosa, Il matrimonio segreto, dir. Giovanni Antonini, regie Stefano Mazzonis di Pralafera, Liège, Dynamic
- 2013 - Gioachino Rossini, Il barbiere di Siviglia dir A. Zedda, Rossini Opera Festival
- 2013 - Gaetano Donizetti, Gemma di Vergy, with Maria Agresta and Gregory Kunde, dir. R. Rizzi-Brignoli, regie Laurent Gerber, Bergamo, Bongiovanni
