= Giovanni Battista Casti =

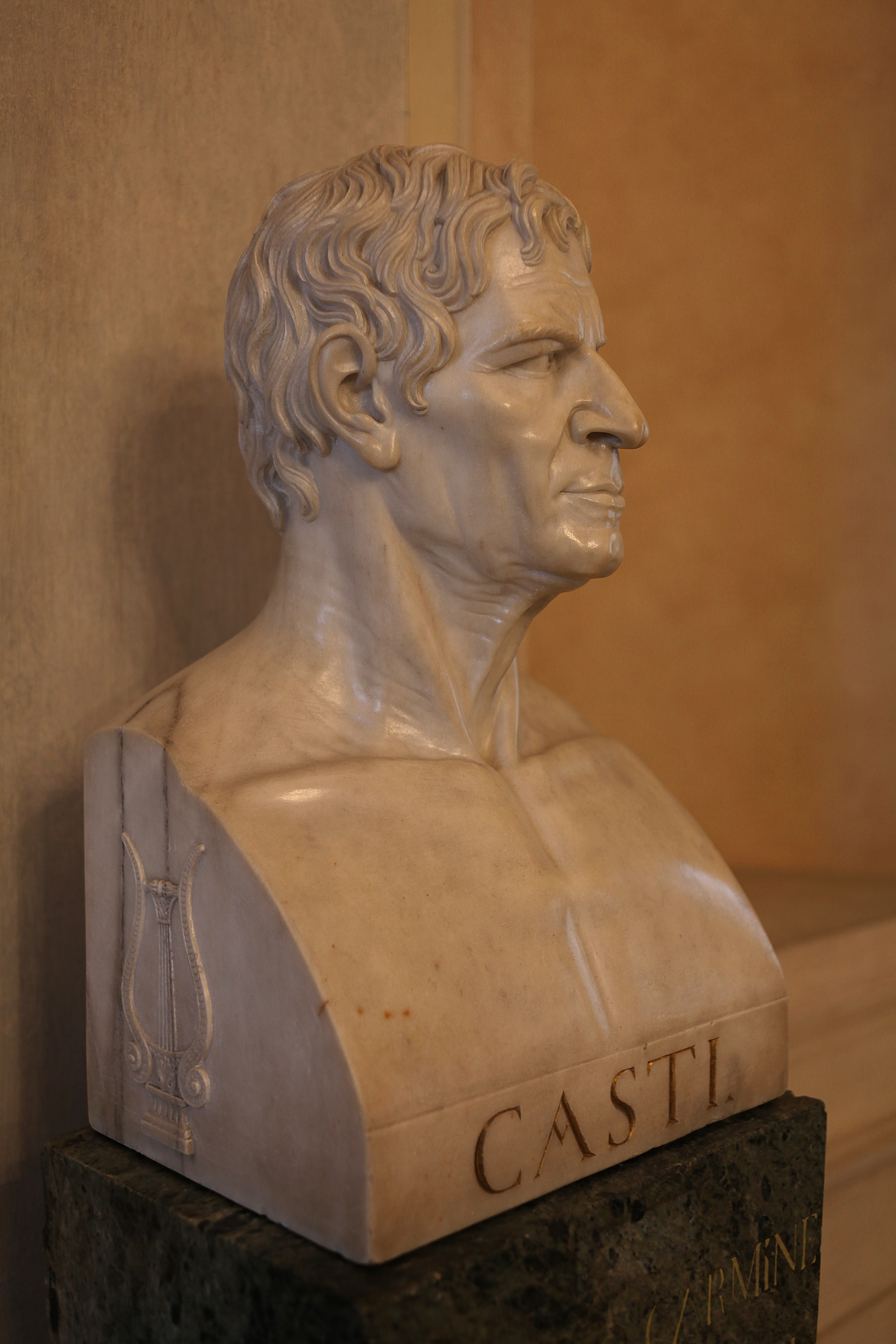
Giovan Batista Casti (1804)

Giovanni Battista Casti (29 August 1724 – 5 February 1803) was an Italian poet, satirist, and author of comic opera librettos.

== Life ==
He was born in Acquapendente near Viterbo. He entered the priesthood after studying at the seminary of Montefiascone and became a canon in the cathedral of his native place, but gave up his chance of church preferment to satisfy his restless spirit by visiting most of the capitals of Europe. In 1784, after the death of Metastasio (in 1782), he failed to be appointed Poeta Cesareo, or poet laureate of Austria, and he left Austria in 1796.

In 1798 he moved to Paris and was able to publish works that had been unacceptable in Italy – the ottava rima Poema tartaro (1797), which satirizes Russia and Catherine II, and the philosophically materialist and often licentious Novelle galanti (definitive edition 1802), satirizing relations between the sexes.

In Paris he also wrote his most famous work, Animali parlanti (1802), a poem in twenty-six canti of six-line stanzas, which uses the classical fable to depict the political battle between the aristocracy and democracy then under way. Though it attracted stinging criticism, it was lauded by Leopardi, who treated it as a model of political satire.

Casti spent the rest of his life in Paris, where he died in 1803.

== Works ==
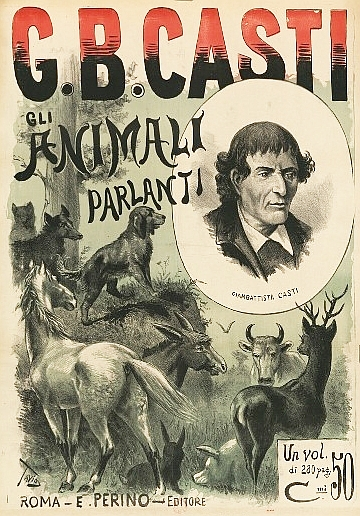
Title page of an edition of Casti's Gli animali parlanti (Rome, 1890)

Casti is best known as the author of the Novelle galanti, and of Gli Animali parlanti, a poetical allegory, over which he spent eight years (1794–1802), which excited so much interest that it was translated into French, German and Spanish, and (very freely and with additions) into English, in William Stewart Rose's Court and Parliament of Beasts (London, 1819). Written during the time of the Revolution in France, it was intended to exhibit the feelings and hopes of the people and the defects and absurdities of various political systems. Some of Goya's print series The Disasters of War drew from the Spanish translation of 1813. The Novelle Galanti is a series of poetical tales, in the ottava rima metre largely used by Italian poets for that class of compositions. One merit of these poems is in the harmony and purity of the style, and the liveliness and sarcastic power of many passages.

Operas for which he provided the librettos include:

- Il re Teodoro in Venezia (music by Giovanni Paisiello, 1784)
- La grotta di Trofonio (music by Antonio Salieri, 1785)
- Prima la musica e poi le parole (music by Antonio Salieri, 1786)
- Cublai gran kan de' Tartari (music by Antonio Salieri, 1787)
- Catilina (music by Antonio Salieri, 1792)
