= Desideri =

Desideri is an Italian surname. Notable people with the surname include:

- Danilo Desideri (born 1940), Italian cinematographer
- Giovanni Desideri (died 1604), Bishop of Rieti
- Ippolito Desideri (1684–1733), Italian Jesuit missionary in Tibet
- Osvaldo Desideri (1939–2023), Italian art director
- Stefano Desideri (born 1965), Italian football player and coach

== See also ==
- Desderi
