= Ettore Desderi =

Italian composer

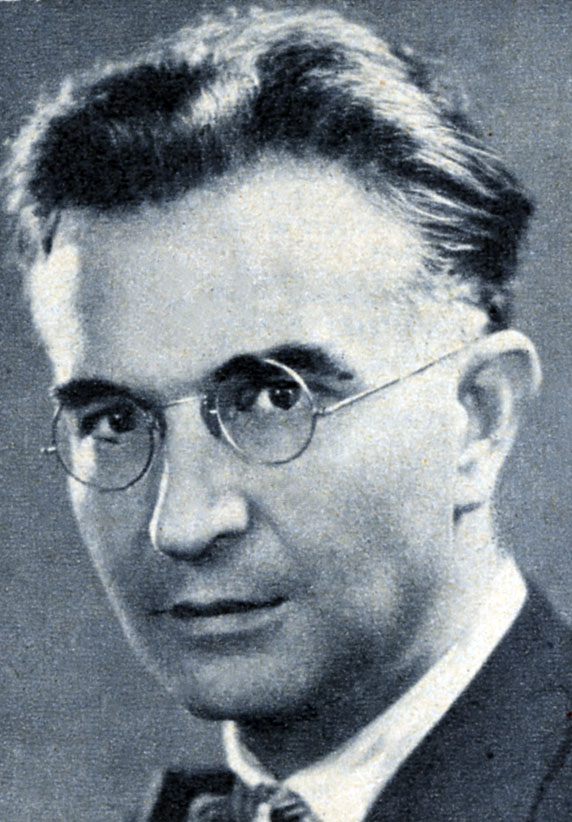
Ettore Desderi

Ettore Desderi (December 10, 1892 – November 23, 1974) was an Italian composer.

Born in Asti, He studied composition at the conservatory in Turin, graduating in 1921, as well as undertaking studies in architecture, which he completed in 1920. He subsequently studied with Ildebrando Pizzetti in Florence. After trying to make a living as an architect, Desderi embarked on a musical career: he directed the conservatory at Alessandria from 1933 to 1941, and then worked as a professor of composition at the conservatories of Milan and Bologna. He retired in 1963. Desderi died in Florence.

Desderi was the father of baritone and conductor Claudio Desderi.

== Compositions ==
Desderi is perhaps best known for his sacred music, especially his cantata Job (1927). He also wrote much instrumental music, as well as several songs. He even wrote a number of works inspired by jazz. His primary influences can be found in the music of Brahms, Franck and Reger.
