= Juan Francisco Gatell =

Argentinian operatic tenor (born 1978)

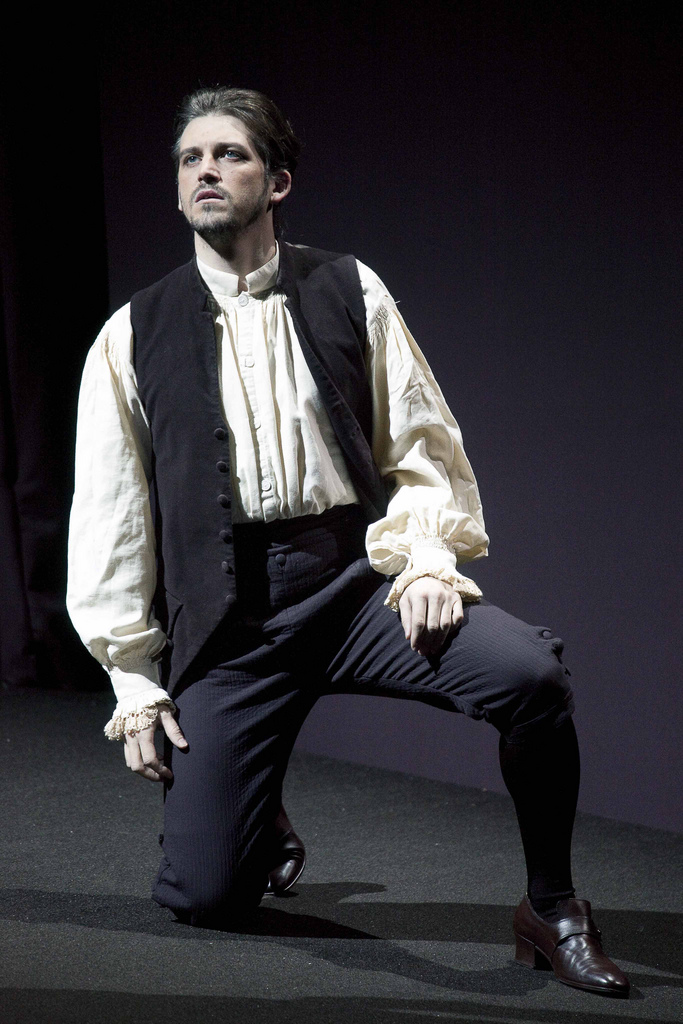
Gatell as Don Ottavio.

Juan Francisco Gatell (born November 28, 1978, in La Plata, Argentina) is an Argentinian operatic tenor who specialises in the bel canto repertoire.

== Biography ==
Juan Francisco Gatell won First Prize of the ASLICO competition in 2006. The same year he debuted the role of Don Ottavio of Don Giovanni (Mozart) in the Teatro dell’Opera in Rome (conducted by Gianluigi Gelmetti), and he has also sung the role in the Verdi Theatre in Trieste, the Comunale in Bologna and La Scala in Milan.

The tenor debuted in Paris at the Opera Garnier with Capriccio (Richard Strauss), also at the Teatro Real in Madrid with Il burbero di buon cuore by Martín y Soler, and at the A Coruña Opera Festival in Così fan tutte. He has worked with Maestro Riccardo Muti on various occasions singing Ernesto in Don Pasquale in Ravenna, in the Viennese Musikverein and at the Théâtre des Champs-Elysées in Paris, as well as debuting as Calandrino in Cimarosa's Il ritorno di Don Calandrino at the Salzburger Pfingsfestspiele; again with Muti on the podium he played Eliézer in Moïse et Pharaon in Salzburg, a role which he also sang in Rome (2010), after which he worked with Muti and the Chicago Symphony Orchestra singing Cassio in Otello in Chicago and in the Carnegie Hall, New York City, in April 2011.

In 2009 he sang at the Washington National Opera for the first time, (Almaviva, Il barbiere di Siviglia, conducted by Michele Mariotti) and in 2010 in the Comunale in Bologna (Nemorino, L’elisir d’amore) and in the Jesi Pergolesi-Spontini Festival (Polidoro, Flaminio). With his Almaviva in Il barbiere di Siviglia he has also debuted in Geneva, Vienna and Tel Aviv (conducted by Roberto Abbado) in the 2010-2011 season. He sang in the Salzburg Summer Festival as Tybalt in Roméo et Juliette (Charles Gounod) and the following year he returned to La Scala in Milan as Belfiore in Il viaggio a Reims.

In July and August 2011 he debuted at the Sferisterio Opera Festival in Macerata in Così fan tutte and at the Rossini Opera Festival in Pesaro.

In the season 2011/2012 he sang in Don Pasquale at the Teatro Municipal de Santiago de Chile, in I Capuleti e i Montecchi at the Opéra de Lyon and the Théâtre des Champs-Élysées, in Pulcinella with the Netherland Radio Chamber Philharmonic, in Il barbiere di Siviglia at the Hamburgosche Staatsoper and at the Wiener Staatsoper and he debuted as Oronte in Alcina at the Opéra de Lausanne.

Juan Francisco Gatell also performs symphonic works and has participated in the Maggio Musicale Fiorentino Festival and in the Ravenna Festival, conducted by Riccardo Muti- singing Mozart's Vesperae solemnes de confessore. He performed L’enfant prodigue in the San Carlo Theatre in Naples in 2008 and Paisiello's Missa Defunctorum in Florence and Salzburg in 2009. The Davidde Penitente (Mozart), Puccini's Messa, Mozart's Requiem, Stravinsky's Pulcinella and Bach's Magnificat are also in his repertoire.

== Roles sung on stage ==
Cimarosa

- Il ritorno di Don Calandrino - Don Calandrino

Donizetti

- Don Pasquale — Ernesto
- L'elisir d'amore - Nemorino

Gounod

- Roméo et Juliette - Tybalt

Leoncavallo

- Pagliacci - Arlecchino

Martín y Soler

- Il burbero di buon cuore - Valerio

Mozart

- Don Giovanni - Don Ottavio
- Die Zauberföte - Tamino
- Così fan tutte - Ferrando

Mussorgsky

- Boris Godunov - Innocente

Pergolesi

- Il Flaminio - Polidoro

Puccini

- Gianni Schicchi - Rinuccio

Rossini

- Il barbiere di Siviglia - Conte d'Almaviva
- La Cenerentola - Don Ramiro
- Moïse et Pharaon - Eliézer
- Semiramide - Idreno
- Il viaggio a Reims - Belfiore

Richard Strauss

- Capriccio - Cantante Italiano

Verdi

- Otello - Cassio

== Discography ==
- Don Pasquale by Donizetti, DVD. Arthaus Musik
- Il burbero di buon cuore by Martín y Soler. Dynamic
- Roméo et Juliette by Gounod. Deutsche Grammophone
- Messa da Requiem by Donizetti. FD Label 2018
