= Gavazzeni =

Gavazzeni is an Italian surname. Notable people with the surname include:

- Gianandrea Gavazzeni (1909–1996), Italian pianist, conductor, composer, and musicologist
- Giovanni Gavazzeni (1841–1907), Italian painter
