= Don Pasquale =

1843 comic opera by Donizetti

- Opera buffa by Gaetano Donizetti
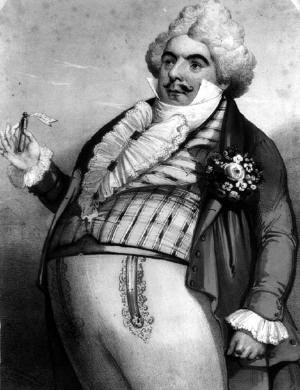
- Luigi Lablache as Dulcamara in L'elisir d'amore in 1832
- Librettist: Giovanni Ruffini; Donizetti
- Language: Italian
- Premiere: 3 January 1843; Théâtre-Italien, Paris

Don Pasquale (Italian pronunciation: [ˈdɔm paˈskwaːle]) is a Gaetano Donizetti opera buffa, or comic opera, in three acts, with an Italian libretto completed largely by Giovanni Ruffini as well as the composer. It was based on a libretto by Angelo Anelli for Stefano Pavesi's opera Ser Marcantonio written in 1810 but, on the published libretto, the author appears as "M.A."

Donizetti so dominated the preparation of the libretto that Ruffini refused to allow his name to be put on the score. This resulted in confusion over the identity of the librettist for more than half a century, but as Herbert Weinstock establishes, it was largely Ruffini's work and, in withholding his name from it as librettist, "Donizetti or [his assistant] Michele Accursi may have thought that, lacking Ruffini's name, the authorship might as well be assigned to Accursi's initials as to a pseudonym".

The opera was first performed on 3 January 1843 by the Théâtre-Italien at the Salle Ventadour in Paris with great success and it is generally regarded as being the high point of the 19th century opera buffa tradition as well as marking its ending.

== Composition history ==
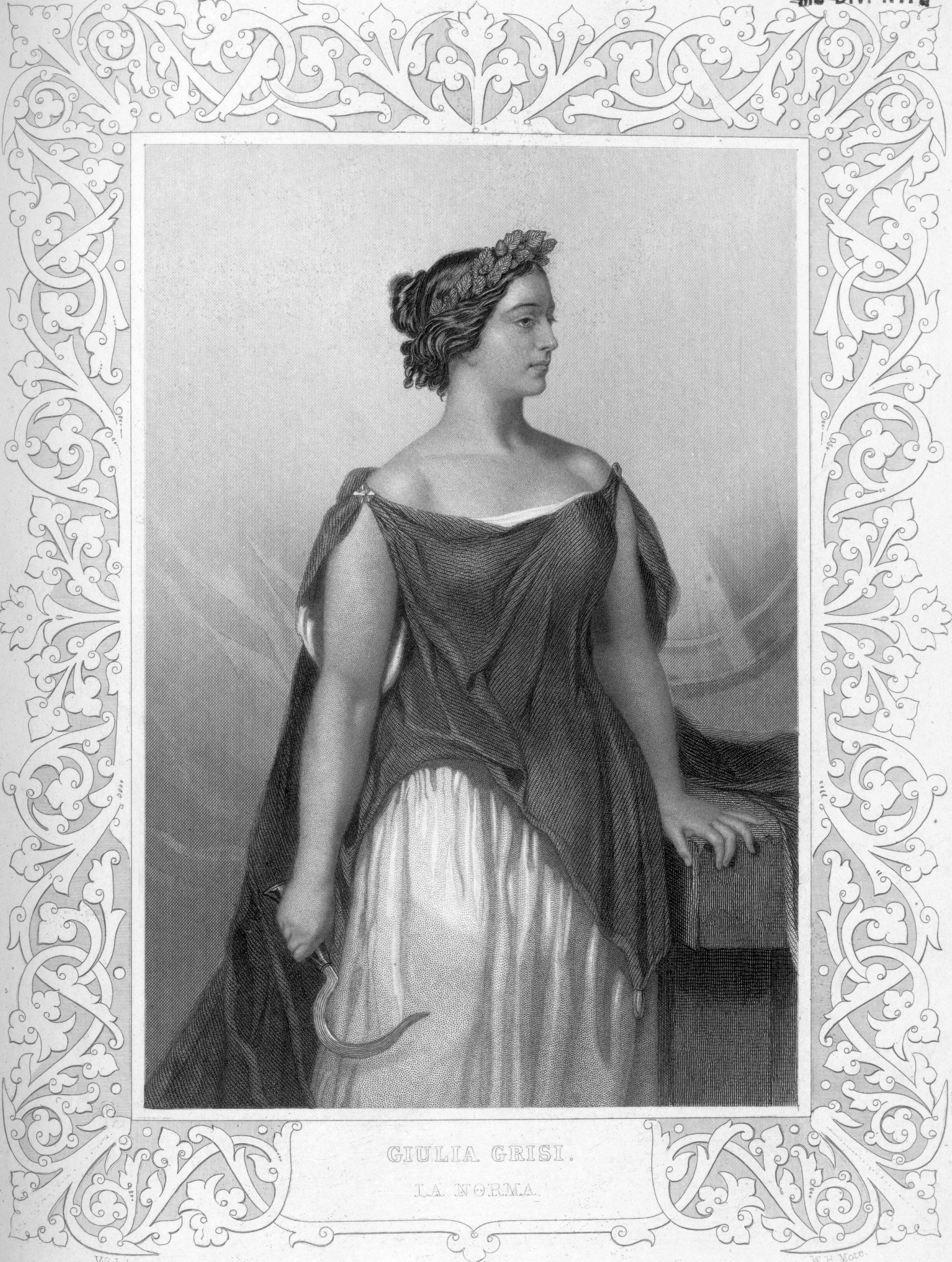
Giulia Grisi, 1844

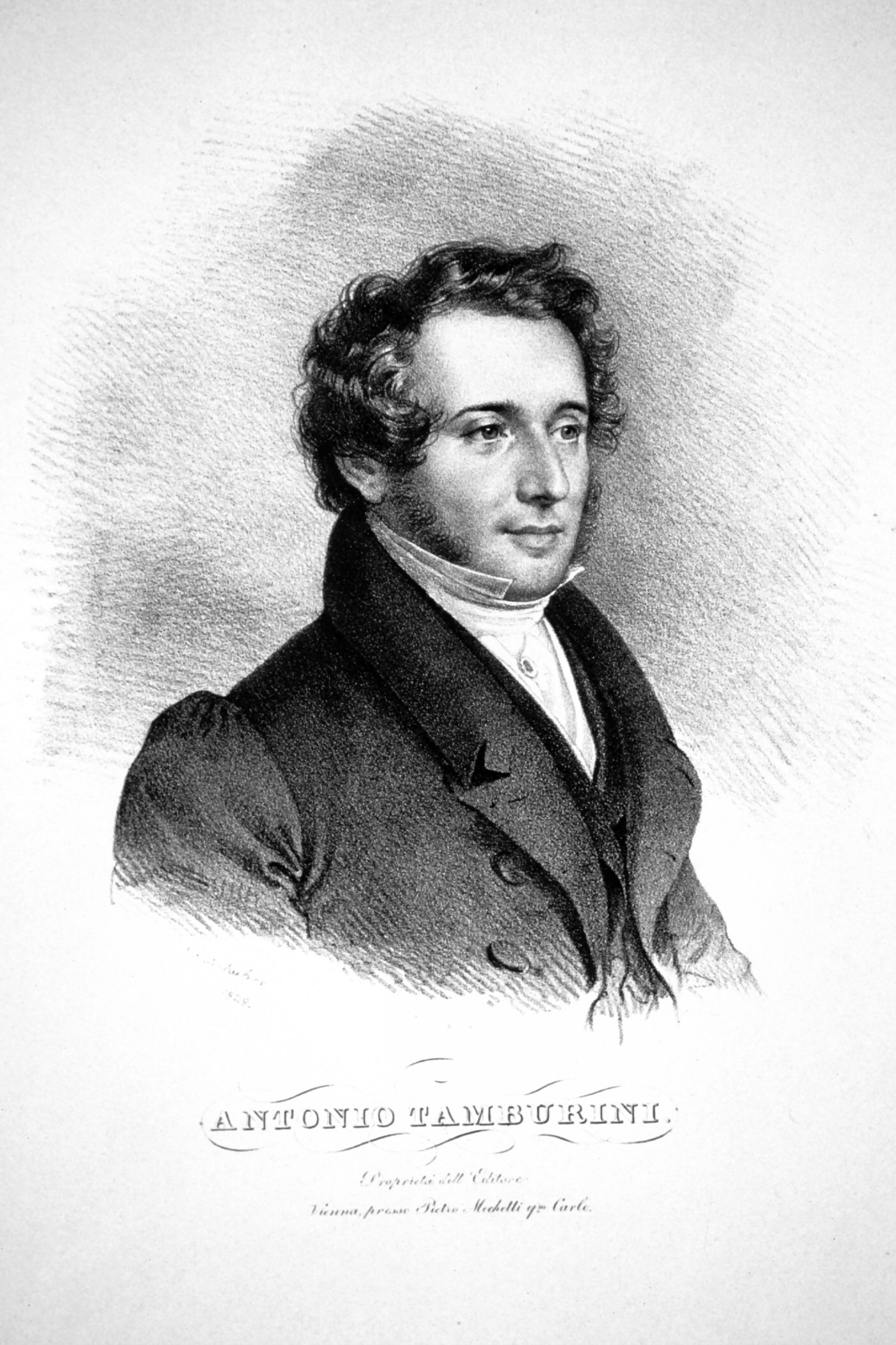
Antonio Tamburini

Donizetti had just returned to Paris from Vienna in the autumn of 1842 and it was there that it was suggested to him by Jules Janin, the newly appointed director of the Théâtre-Italien, that he might compose a new opera for that house. Janin prepared a formal proposal on 27 September, but while no specific subject nor title was mentioned, Janin suggested that it should be a new opera buffa tailored to the talents of some major singers including Giulia Grisi, Antonio Tamburini, and Luigi Lablache.

At around the same time in September, the Italian émigré librettist Giovanni Ruffini, who lived in Paris, was approached by Michele Accursi (who is described as "Donizetti's Paris factotum, [an] Italian exile, and politically treacherous double agent") with the suggestion that Ruffini offer his services to Donizetti as a librettist. This is confirmed by a letter from Ruffini to his mother of around 5 October in which the librettist tells her of Accursi's suggestion that the composer would use a story which was written in 1810 and that he would need "a working stonemason of verses to remake the old libretto, to cut, change, add, plaster, and I don't know what." In addition, it is clear from another letter on 11 October to his mother that Ruffini is hard at work: "I've been eating up the paper, as they say. It's not a question of doing it well or doing it badly, but of doing it fast." By the end, Ruffini stated that so much of the refinement of the work had been done by Donizetti that he felt that "my freedom of action having been paralyzed by the maestro, I don't, so to say, recognize it as mine". Therefore, he refused to have his name associated with the libretto, which was eventually published by Casa Ricordi as by "M.A.", since it was Accursi who officially ceded the rights to Ricordi so long as his name was never associated with the work.

In the tradition of opera buffa, the opera makes reference to the stock characters of the commedia dell'arte. Pasquale is recognizable as the blustery Pantalone, Ernesto as the lovesick Pierrot, Malatesta as the scheming Scapino, and Norina as a wily Columbina. The false Notary echoes a long line of false officials as operatic devices.

With rehearsals in progress in December 1842, it appeared that there was general pessimism as to its success: "the atmosphere during rehearsals was frigid" states Weinstock and records the lack of interest from the management and the orchestra musicians. "The work had been condemned, judged", he concludes. However, during the evening of the final dress rehearsal, Donizetti added a new piece which he had already written for the tenor, Com'è gentil, which was designed for the third act. As for fears for the opera's success, the composer had none: "Have no fear for me...My work will be a success", he stated.

== Performance history ==
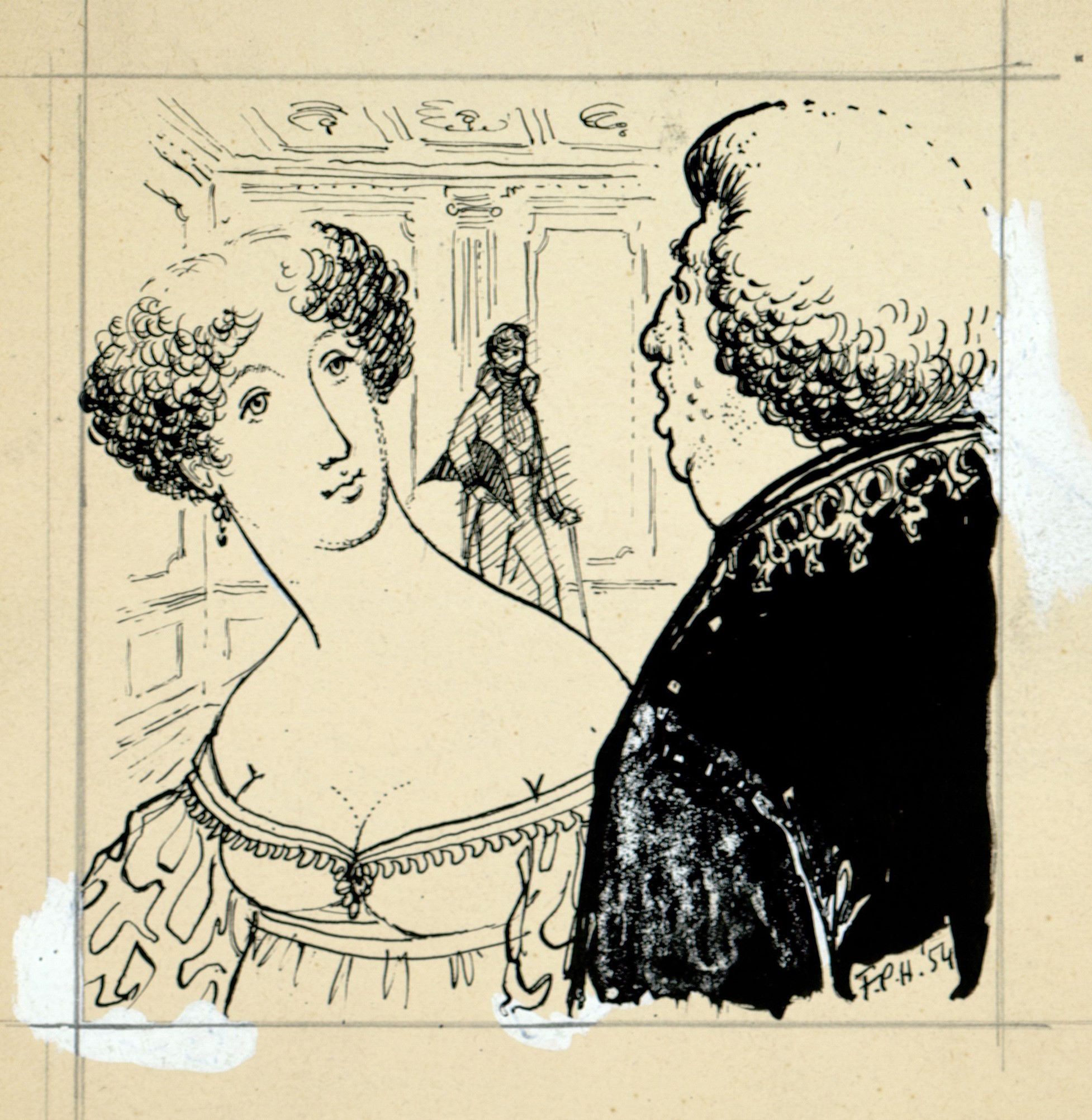
Drawing for Don Pasquale (1954)

At its on 3 January 1843 premiere in Paris, Don Pasquale was performed by four of the most celebrated singers of the day and was an immediate success. It was recognized at the time as Donizetti's comic masterpiece and, to this day, is still considered as such. Pasquale remains one of the most popular of his 66 operas, as well as being one of the three most popular Italian comic operas, the others being Rossini's The Barber of Seville and Donizetti's own L'elisir d'amore.

The first performance in Italy was at La Scala in Milan on 17 April 1843 with Ottavia Malvani (Norina), Napoleone Rossi (Pasquale), Leone Corelli (Ernesto), and Achille De Bassini (Malatesta). Its first performance in Vienna was at the Kärtnertortheater (in Italian) on 14 May 1843, a production in which Donizetti participated and added the comic baritone duet "Cheti, cheti, immantinente" from a discarded portion of his unperformed opera L'Ange de Nisida. In England it was first presented on 29 June 1843 at Her Majesty's Theatre in London (in Italian).

The opera was translated into French by Gustave Vaëz and Alphonse Royer and given in Brussels on 11 August 1843, Lille on 9 November 1843, and at the Théâtre d'Orléans in New Orleans on 7 January 1845. The opera was first performed in Buenos Aires on 18 May 1851. The first Australian performance was presented in Sydney on 12 October 1854 at the Royal Victoria Theatre.

In the years since World War II, the opera has been performed frequently.

== Roles ==
Role	Voice type	Premiere cast, 3 January 1843 Conductor: Théophile Tilmant
Don Pasquale, an elderly bachelor	bass	Luigi Lablache
Dr Malatesta, his physician	baritone	Antonio Tamburini
Ernesto, Pasquale's nephew	tenor	Giovanni Mario
Norina, a youthful widow, Ernesto's beloved	soprano	Giulia Grisi
Carlino, Malatesta's cousin and a notary	bass	Federico Lablache
Servants

== Synopsis ==
Overture to Don Pasquale (6:21)
Composed by Gaetano Donizetti, performed in 1993 by U.S. Marine Band.

Time: Early 19th century
Place: Rome

=== Overture ===
The music is suggestive of a comic opera; bright and lively, it starts with plenty of percussion and brass instruments. After a while, the ambience changes to suggesting a party, and concludes with a brass fanfare.

=== Act 1 ===
Scenes 1–3: A room in the home of Don Pasquale, at 9 o'clock

Ernesto has refused the woman that his uncle Don Pasquale had found for him, and as a result is to be disinherited. Ernesto declares his devotion to the young – but poor – widow Norina. In view of Ernesto's determination, Don Pasquale decides to marry in old age to produce his own heir, and anxiously awaits the arrival of his physician, Dr. Malatesta, who is determined to teach Don Pasquale how foolish he is being, but has been pretending to search for a suitable bride. Malatesta, confronted with Pasquale's impatience, mutters that he is a buffoon, but proceeds to describe the attributes of the bride-to-be (Bella siccome un angelo – "Beautiful like an angel"): honest, modest, and sweet. When pressed, Malatesta reveals she is, in fact, his sister. Overcome with joy, Pasquale demands to meet her at once, and sends Malatesta to fetch her, before singing of the love that has gripped him (Ah, un foco insolito – "A sudden fire").

Ernesto comes back and pleads with the Don to consult with his friend Malatesta – when he hears that Malatesta supposedly supports Pasquale, he is amazed at this apparent betrayal (Mi fa il destino mendico – "Fate has made a beggar of me"). Ernesto determines to elope and writes to tell Norina that all is lost.

Scenes 4–5: An apartment in the home of Norina

Norina sits alone, reading a book. She recites a passage, before laughing at the situation described and reflecting on her own temperament (So anch'io la virtù magica – "I too know your magical virtues"). She is in cahoots with Dr. Malatesta and impatiently waits for him to come and explain his plan at which he had only hinted at. A servant delivers the letter from Ernesto, which she quickly reads and is instantly dismayed.

Malatesta arrives to explain the stratagem, but Norina cuts him off and hands him the letter, which he reads aloud: Ernesto has announced his intention to leave Rome, and Europe altogether. Malatesta reassures her, saying that he has adapted his plan: Norina shall play the part of Malatesta's sister. Having arranged for his cousin to act as a notary, they will easily deceive the Don. Norina consents to play her part in the deception, and they discuss her strategies in a lively duet (Pronta son; purch'io non manchi – "I am ready; if I do not miss").

=== Act 2 ===
Act II finale, "Son tradito", at the Liceu in 2015. Cast: Lorenzo Regazzo (Don Pasquale), Valentina Nafornita (Norina), Juan Francisco Gatell (Ernesto), Mariusz Kwiecien (Dottor Malatesta)

A salon in the home of Don Pasquale

Ernesto is alone: lamenting his fate, he considers his decision to leave Rome (Cercherò lontana terra – "I shall seek a distant land"). He leaves the room just as Pasquale enters, dressed in his outdated finery, along with his servants, to whom he gives instructions to admit Malatesta on his arrival. He parades around in his grand costume, hoping it will conceal his advancing years.

Malatesta arrives with Norina in tow, and introduces her to Pasquale as his sister, Sofronia, fresh out of the convent. Pasquale is smitten, and Norina plays the part of a dutiful, modest and submissive lady, to Pasquale's satisfaction. Norina consents to the proposed marriage, which delights Pasquale. He wants to send for the notary to conduct the ceremony straight away – conveniently, Malatesta has brought one along, who waits in the antechamber.

Malatesta fetches the supposed notary, as servants arrange a table. Taking his seat, the "notary" writes out a marriage contract as dictated by Malatesta and Pasquale (Fra da una parta – "Between, on one hand"), where the Don bequeaths all his estate to be administered by Sofronia. The contract is quickly drawn up: Pasquale signs but, before Norina can affix her signature, Ernesto bursts in. Intending to say a final farewell, he is amazed to see Norina about to marry Pasquale. However, Malatesta persuades him not to say anything (Figliol non mi far scene – "Son, don't make a scene"), and he is forced to act as the final witness much to Don Pasquale's delight.

As soon as the contract is signed, Norina abandons her pretence of docility, and refuses Pasquale's embrace. She announces her intention to teach him manners, and to have Ernesto as a gallant to accompany her on evening strolls. Pasquale is horrified at this transformation, while Malatesta and Ernesto can barely conceal their amusement (È rimasto là impietrato – "He stands there, petrified"). Summoning the household staff, Norina recites a long list of demands – more servants (young and handsome at that), carriages and horses, furniture – and instructs them to spare no expense, doubling all their wages. Pasquale is stricken at his misfortune, so Malatesta urges him to go to bed.

=== Act 3 ===
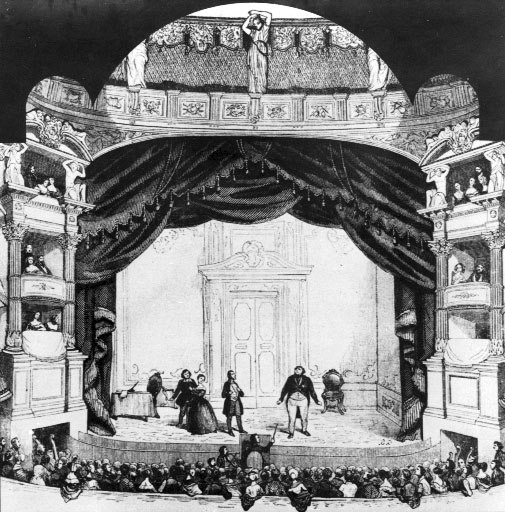
Staging of Don Pasquale at the Salle Ventadour in Paris (1843)

Scenes 1–5: A room in the home of Don Pasquale

Pasquale sits in a room, surrounded by piles of newly purchased jewels, dresses and the like, as the servants bustle in and out of Norina's apartment (I diamanti presto presto – "The diamonds, quickly, quickly"). Dismayed by the piles of bills and invoices, the Don summons the courage to confront his tyrannical new wife. Norina emerges, dressed to go out. He attempts to reason with her, but she pays little heed (Signorina, in tanta fretta – "Madam, where are you off to in such a hurry"). He suggests that if she leaves, he may not allow her to return, an idea that she meets with patronising insincerity (Via, caro sposino – "There, there, dear little husband") but the discussion ends in her slapping him. As she exits, she drops a note which Pasquale picks up and reads. The note is addressed to Sofronia, arranging a meeting in the garden with its unnamed, admiring author. Pasquale calls for a servant to summon Malatesta, before leaving the room.

The servants return and, amongst themselves, at once complain at the amount of work they are being made to do, and reveal how much they are enjoying the farcical drama developing between Pasquale and his new wife (Che interminabile andirivieni! – "Such endless coming and going!"). At the approach of Malatesta and Ernesto, however, they exit, assured of more entertainment to come. Malatesta reminds Ernesto of the finer points of their plan, and the latter leaves. The doctor moves forward to greet Don Pasquale, who tells him of Norina's intended assignation, and his own plan to expose her unfaithfulness before a magistrate. Malatesta persuades him to moderate his plan and Pasquale, believing him an ally, consents to his conditions, while plotting his revenge on Norina (Aspetta, aspetta, cara sposina – "Wait, wait, dear little wife").

Scenes 6–7: The garden, adjoining Pasquale's house

In the garden, as night draws in, Ernesto sings of his love for Norina, as he waits for her arrival (Com'è gentil – "How lovely"). At last, Norina emerges, and they express their love: (Tornami a dir che m'ami – "Tell me once more that you love me"). Don Pasquale and Malatesta have observed and, as they reveal themselves, Ernesto covers himself with a cloak and runs to the house. Pasquale tries to confront Norina – he has caught her in flagrante – but this only provokes a fight that leaves the Don spluttering. She refuses to leave at his demand, so Malatesta, as per his agreement with Pasquale, takes over. Pretending to negotiate with Norina/Sofronia, he tells Pasquale that the only way to make her leave will be to allow Ernesto to marry his beloved, whom "Sofronia" apparently despises. Pasquale consents, and calls out to the house, from which Ernesto and the servants emerge. He instructs Ernesto to send for his would-be bride, but Malatesta reveals that Norina is in fact the woman Pasquale thinks he married, while the real Sofronia remains in a convent. All are reconciled, and the moral of the story – not to marry in old age – is revealed in a playful quartet (La moral di tutto questo – "The moral of all this").

== Recordings ==
Year	Cast (Don Pasquale, Norina, Malatesta, Ernesto)	Conductor, Opera house and orchestra	Label
1930–31	Attilio Giuliani, Ines Alfani-Tellini, Lorenzo Conati, Christy Solari	Lorenzo Molajoli; Teatro alla Scala, Milan Orchestra and Chorus	78rpm records: Columbia; Cat: GQX 10100–10105
1932	Ernesto Badini, Adelaide Saraceni, Afro Poli, Tito Schipa	Carlo Sabajno; La Scala Orchestra and Chorus	CD: Arkadia; Cat: 2CD 78017
1952	Sesto Bruscantini, Alda Noni, Mario Borriello, Cesare Valletti	Mario Rossi, Orchestra e Coro Sinfonica di Torino della RAI	CD: Warner Fonit Cetra; Cat: 8573 87476-2
1964	Fernando Corena, Graziella Sciutti, Tom Krause, Juan Oncina	István Kertész; Vienna State Opera Orchestra and Chorus	CD: Decca "Originals"; Cat: 897402
1978	Donald Gramm, Beverly Sills, Alan Titus, Alfredo Kraus	Sarah Caldwell; London Symphony Orchestra and Ambrosian Opera Chorus	CD: EMI; Cat: CDMB 5 66030-2
1979	Gabriel Bacquier, Beverly Sills, Håkan Hagegård, Alfredo Kraus	Nicola Rescigno; Metropolitan Opera Orchestra and Chorus (John Dexter production)	Streaming video: Met Opera on Demand
1979	Evgeny Nesterenko, Lucia Popp, Bernd Weikl, Francisco Araiza	Heinz Wallberg; Münchner Rundfunkorchester and Chor des Bayerischen Rundfunks	CD: BMG; Cat: 74321 32229 2
1983	Sesto Bruscantini, Mirella Freni, Leo Nucci, Gösta Winbergh	Riccardo Muti; Philharmonia Orchestra and Ambrosian Opera Chorus	CD: EMI; Cat: 7 47068-2
1983	Jozsef Gregor, Magda Kalmár, István Gáti, János Bándi	Iván Fischer; Hungarian State Orchestra and Hungarian Radio and Television Chorus	CD: Hungaraton; Cat: HCD12416-17
1988	Geraint Evans, Lillian Watson, Russell Smythe, Ryland Davies	Richard Armstrong; Welsh Philharmonia and Welsh National Opera Chorale	HTV SL 2007 (VHS tape)
1990	Gabriel Bacquier, Barbara Hendricks, Gino Quilico, Luca Canonici	Gabriele Ferro; Opéra de Lyon Orchestra and Chorus	Erato 2292-45487-2 (CD)
1993	Renato Bruson, Eva Mei, Sir Thomas Allen, Frank Lopardo	Roberto Abbado; Munich Radio Orchestra and Bayerischer Rundfunk Chorus	CD: RCA; Cat: 09026 61924-2
1994	Ferruccio Furlanetto, Nuccia Focile, Lucio Gallo, Gregory Kunde	Riccardo Muti; Orchestra e Coro del Teatro alla Scala (Stage director: Stefano Vizioli)	DVD: TDK; Cat: DVWW OPDPSC
2006	Ruggero Raimondi, Isabel Rey, Oliver Widmer, Juan Diego Flórez	Nello Santi; Zurich Opera House Orchestra and Chorus (Video recording of a performance at the Zurich Opera)	DVD: Decca; Cat: 000944109
2007	Claudio Desderi, Laura Giordano, Mario Cassi, Juan Francisco Gatell	Riccardo Muti; Orchestra Giovanile Luigi Cherubini; Coro del Teatro Municipale di Piacenza	DVD: Arthaus Musik; Cat: 101303
2010	John Del Carlo; Anna Netrebko; Mariusz Kwiecień; Matthew Polenzani	James Levine; Metropolitan Opera orchestra and chorus	Deutsche Grammophon
