= Ravenna Festival =

Music festival in Italy

- Status: Active
- Genre: Opera, music, dance, film
- Frequency: Annually, June and July
- Locations: Ravenna, Italy
- Country: Italy
- Inaugurated: 1990
- Founder: Maria Cristina Mazzavillani
- Website: ravennafestival.org

The Ravenna Festival is a summer festival of opera and classical music (as well as dance, jazz, ethnic, musical theater, ballett, sacred music, electronic music, drama, film, plus conventions and exhibitions) held in the city of Ravenna, Italy and the surrounding area each June and July.

It was founded in 1990 by Maria Cristina Mazzavillani, the wife of conductor Riccardo Muti, who makes regular appearances there.

Other well-known conductors who have appeared at the Festival include Pierre Boulez, Claudio Abbado, Chung, Gavazzeni, Lorin Maazel, Valery Gergiev, Zubin Mehta, Georg Solti, Giuseppe Sinopoli, Carlos Kleiber, and Georges Prêtre. The Festival also offers operatic productions in the Teatro Comunale Alighieri, as well as performances of jazz and popular music.

== See also ==
- Opera festivals
